= Glen Chin =

American actor

- 陳英明
- Born: January 27, 1948; Stockton, California, U.S.
- Died: August 16, 2018 (aged 70); Stockton, California, U.S.
- Occupation: Actor
- Years active: 1982–2015
- Spouse: Roberta Chow (m. 1999)

Glen Chin (January 27, 1948 – August 16, 2018) was an American actor who starred in film and television.

== Background ==
Chin was born in Stockton, California on January 27, 1948. He was the eldest of eight children. His father owned the Quong Wah Yen sausage factory and grocery in Chinatown. He attended Amos Alonzo Stagg High School and was active in drama and choir. He studied music at the University of Pacific Conservatory of Music and played the double bass violin with the Stockton Symphony.

Chin married Roberta Chow in 1999, the daughter of the Hong Kong film producer Raymond Chow.

Chin died in Stockon on August 16, 2018.

== Filmography ==
=== Films ===
Year	Film	Role	Director	Notes
1982	Jekyll and Hyde... Together Again	Sushi Chef #1	Jerry Belson	
1985	Maxie	Chinese Movie Patron	Paul Aaron	
1987	The Underachievers	Chinese Man	Jackie Kong	
1987	Hard Ticket to Hawaii	Earring	Andy Sidaris	
1987	Who's That Girl	Bank Guard	James Foley	
1987	Nightstick	Hop Sing	Joseph L. Scanlan	
1989	The Iron Triangle	Chau	Eric Weston	
1990	Silent Night, Deadly Night 4: Initiation	Jo the Butcher	Brian Yuzna	Direct-to-video release
1991	Defending Your Life	Cole	Albert Brooks	
1992	The Master	Taxi Driver	Tsui Hark	Uncredited role
1992	The Days of Being Dumb	The General	Peter Chan	
1993	Teenage Mutant Ninja Turtles III	Jailer	Stuart Gillard	
1993	Snapdragon	Merchant	Worth Keeter	
1994	Naked Gun 33⅓: The Final Insult	Sumo Wrestler	Peter Segal	
1994	3 Ninjas Kick Back	Nurse Shibuya	Charles T. Kanganis	
1994	Natural Born Killers	Druggist	Oliver Stone	
1994	In This Corner	Jerry, Nightclub Owner	Michael Feit Dougan	
1995	Rumble in the Bronx	Man	Stanley Tong	Uncredited role
1996	Black Mask		Daniel Lee	Voice only
1997	Mr. Nice Guy	Man	Sammo Hung	Uncredited role
1997	The Girl Gets Moe	Chang	James Bruce	Direct-to-video release
1998	Knock Off	Skinny	Tsui Hark	
1999	Godzilla 2000		Takao Okawara	Voice only
1999	After One Cigarette	Shigeru	Peter Stougaard	Short film. Credited as Glenn Chin (sic)
2000	East of A	Hiro	Amy Goldstein	Voice only
2000	Partners	Big Hwa	Joey Travolta	Direct-to-video release
2000	The Art of War	Ochai	Christian Duguay	
2001	Hollywood Hong Kong	Mr. Chu	Fruit Chan	
2004	50 First Dates	Cafe Regular	Peter Segal	
2004	Enter the Phoenix		Stephen Fung	
2007	Macau Twilight	Passenger	Tony Shyu	Short film
2007	The Drummer	Uncle Tak	Kenneth Bi	
2008	A Decade of Love		various	Credited as Ying-ming Chan
2008	The Boxer		Jason Tobin	Short film
2008	The Heir Apparent: Largo Winch	Policier	Jérôme Salle	
2008	Sunny and the Elephant	Payao	Frédéric Lepage	
2014	Hong Kong Rebels	Dealer Chao	Uri L. Schwarz and Jason Sankey	
2015	Jasmine	Doctor Wu	Dax Phelan	

=== Television ===
Year(s)	Title	Role(s)	Notes
1983	Matt Houston	Kabuki Player #1	S1E11 "The Rock and the Hard Place"
1987	The New Monkees	Sonny	S1E4 "Minister Bob"
1988	Sledge Hammer!	Nakamichi	S2E16 "Suppose They Gave a War and Sledge Came?"
1988	She's the Sheriff	Hirohito Yamamoto	S1E21 "Dinsmore's Wedding"
1988	227	Sumo Wrestler	S4E7 "A Yen for Lester"
1990	Shangri-La Plaza	Customer #3	TV movie
1990	Father Dowling Mysteries	Sumo Bouncer	S3E9 "The Vanishing Victim Mystery"
1991	Harry and the Hendersons	Sumo Wrestler	S2E8 "George's White Light"
1992	Doogie Howser, M.D.	Japanese Businessman	S3E18 "What You See Ain't Necessarily What You Get"
1992	Seinfeld	Harry Fong	S4E9 "The Opera"
1992	Saved by the Bell: Hawaiian Style	Pono	TV movie
1993	Parker Lewis	Workman	S3E12 "An Unmarried Musso"
1994	Mighty Max	Lao Chu; Ki Wan (voices)	S2E5 "Year of the Rat"
1994	Hardball	Mr. Sunga	S1E5 "Frank Buys an Island, Mike Pays the Price"
1996	The Rockford Files: Godfather Knows Best	Master Jun	TV movie
1996	Night Stand with Dick Dietrick	Coco	S1E46 "Mail Order Brides"
1998	Boy Meets World	Eskimo	S5E13 "The Eskimo"
2000	Son of the Beach	Mr. X	S1E1 "With Sex You Get Eggroll"
2000	Manhattan, AZ	Chief Yoshi Whitefeather	S1E3 "Indian Wars"
2001	Rocket Power	Johnny Loo (voice)	S2E15 "Capture the Flag/The Jinx"

=== Music videos ===
Year	Song	Artist	Director	Role	Notes
1991	"Black or White"	Michael Jackson	John Landis	Self	Uncredited
