= Wu Assassins =

American television series

- Genre: Action; Crime drama; Martial arts; Supernatural fiction
- Created by: John Wirth; Tony Krantz
- Starring: Iko Uwais; Mark Dacascos; JuJu Chan; Byron Mann; Li Jun Li; Celia Au; Lewis Tan; Lawrence Kao; Tommy Flanagan; Katheryn Winnick
- Composer: Jeehun Hwang
- Country of origin: United States
- Original languages: English; Cantonese
- No. of seasons: 1
- No. of episodes: 10

Production
- Executive producers: John Wirth; Chad Oakes; Michael Frislev; Tony Krantz; Stephen Fung; Iko Uwais; Katheryn Winnick
- Producer: Chris Rudolph
- Cinematography: John Bartley
- Editors: Elísabet Rónaldsdottir; Bridget Durnford; Christopher A. Smith
- Camera setup: Single-camera
- Running time: 40–50 minutes
- Production companies: Wirthwhile TV; Flame Ventures; Nomadic Pictures Entertainment; Living Films

Original release
- Network: Netflix
- Release: August 8, 2019

Related
- Fistful of Vengeance

Wu Assassins is an American supernatural action television series, created by John Wirth and Tony Krantz that premiered on Netflix on August 8, 2019. The series stars Iko Uwais, Byron Mann, Lewis Tan, Lawrence Kao, Celia Au, Li Jun Li, Tommy Flanagan, and Katheryn Winnick. The first season received positive reviews, with critics praising the fight choreography, although there was criticism of the plot.

In February 2021, a standalone film titled Fistful of Vengeance was announced. The film continues the story from the ending of the first season. It was released on February 17, 2022.

== Premise ==
Kai Jin, a young Chinatown chef in present-day San Francisco, becomes entangled with the Chinese Triad's pursuit of deadly ancient powers known as the "Wu Xing". After an encounter with a mystical spirit, Kai reluctantly becomes the Wu Assassin, imbued with the skill and power of 1,000 monks who chose to die together to place their collective essence into an amulet. Having absorbed the amulet, Kai uses his enhanced martial arts skills to recover supernatural powers from five modern day criminals threatening to destroy the world. He is the 1,000th, and last, in the line of Wu Assassins.

== Cast and characters ==
=== Main ===
- Iko Uwais as Kai Jin, the main protagonist and a Chinese-Indonesian chef in San Francisco's Chinatown, who learns that he is the last of the Wu Assassins, whose duty it is to kill the five Wu Warlords, who possess supernatural powers based around fire, wood, earth, metal and water. As the Wu Assassin, he has increased physical strength and agility, is able to change his appearance to hide his identity, and can withstand the Wu Lords' supernatural attacks.
- Byron Mann as Uncle Six, a leader of the Triad who runs the criminal world in San Francisco's Chinatown and is Kai Jin's adoptive stepfather. As the Fire Wu he can create tendrils and projectiles made of fire, and can heat up and set objects alight.
- Li Jun Li as Jenny Wah, a young restaurateur who runs her family's Chinese-American restaurant, Master Wah's, and is Kai Jin's friend.
- Celia Au as Ying Ying, a woman who teaches Kai the ways of a Wu Assassin. She was the first Wu Assassin to hunt and fight the Wu Warlords, and only one of the first 999 Wu Assassins to successfully kill all 5 Warlords and imprison their collective Wu Xing powers, only to be stymied moments later when attacked, and killed, by a random soldier.
- Lewis Tan as Lu Xin Lee, Kai's friend who owns Lee's Wheels, a custom garage, which is also a front for two auto theft rings run by the Triad and McCullough respectively.
- Lawrence Kao as Tommy Wah, Jenny's older brother, who is a heroin addict and a member of the Triad.
- Tommy Flanagan as Alec McCullough, a Scottish crime boss operating mostly in Europe, who relocates to America to try to take over the Triad's territory in San Francisco's Chinatown. He is a former Wu Assassin who became the Wood Wu Lord, and as such is able to manipulate plants and trees, and has healing powers that result in him having an extended lifespan.
- Katheryn Winnick as Christine "CG" Gavin, an undercover inspector of the San Francisco Police Department, recently hired to work at Lee's Wheels.

=== Recurring ===
- Tzi Ma as Mr. Young, Kai's neighbor and a Chinese grocery owner
- JuJu Chan as Zan, the triad's lieutenant and Uncle Six's right-hand woman, though she is determined to become the triad's leader
- Mark Dacascos as an unnamed monk, whose body and face disguises Kai's identity when he fights as the Wu Assassin
- Cranston Johnson as Frank Fletcher, the police captain of San Francisco Police Department and CG's boss

=== Guest ===
- Jeff Fahey as Jack, a retired cop whom CG visits for information on Uncle Six (in "Fire Chicken")
- Robin McLeavy as Maggie McCullough, Alec McCullough's late wife (in "Codladh Sámh", "Gu Assassins", and "Paths: Part 2")
- Kevin Durand as James Baxter, the Earth Wu, who can control the earth, telekinetically move rocks, and turn flesh to stone (in "Legacy")
- Summer Glau as Miss Jones, the Water Wu, who can turn into and manipulate water (in "Paths: Parts 1 & 2")
- Travis Caldwell as Gideon, the Metal Wu, who can manipulate metal, electronics, electricity and possess people's bodies through their hemoglobin (in "Paths: Parts 1 & 2")
- Davin Tong as young Tommy.

== Episodes ==
No.	Title	Directed by	Written by	Original release date
1	"Drunken Watermelon"	Stephen Fung	John Wirth	August 8, 2019
Kai Jin is a Chinatown chef. One day, he is attacked by Triad thugs and escapes, but finds an unconscious young woman in the street. The woman wakes up and reveals that she is Ying Ying, the first Wu Assassin. She deems Kai to be pure of heart and gives him a Monk Piece, which bestows on him the power to defeat the modern day Wu Warlords. Uncle Six, a Triad boss and Kai's stepfather, tries to recruit him, but Kai refuses. When Kai's neighbor is attacked by the Triad, Kai defeats all of them in disguise as one of the original monks. Meanwhile, the FBI boss Frankie hires Christine "CG" Gavin to follow a triad member named Lu Xin Lee, who is Kai Jin's best friend, to investigate the conflict between the Russian Mob and the Triad.
2	"Misspent Youth"	Stephen Fung	Cameron Litvack	August 8, 2019
Under Ying Ying's tutelage, Kai starts to understand the role of the Wu Assassin, although he still claims that he is not a killer. Uncle Six learns about the Wu Assassin's return. CG starts working for Lu Xin, and meets Kai. Kai learns that Uncle Six is the Fire Wu Lord. Jenny saves Tommy from an opium gang.
3	"Fire Chicken"	Roel Reiné	Yalun Tu	August 8, 2019
Alec's Russian gang kills Uncle Six's entire counterfeiting operation in a night club, causing Frankie to worry about CG. Kai warns CG about her fate that he saw in his dreams before leaving, prompting CG to look into Kai. Jenny scolds Tommy for relapsing into heroin addiction and getting involved with gangs, and tells him that their parents will be meeting with them soon. Kai asks Jenny if he can work under her due to his food truck being ruined. Jenny agrees, but reveals to Kai that she took a loan from Six to remodel the restaurant, which upsets him. CG asks her boss for a week to capture the Russian gang leader and Uncle Six. Meanwhile, Six orders his men to find the Wu Assassin. Tommy drives Zan, Uncle Six's bodyguard, and his men to kidnap all the bald chefs in Chinatown. Uncle Six meets with Kai to try to reconnect with him, but is rebuffed. Jenny confronts Zan when she sees Zan kidnapping her chef, but Zan defeats her in a fight. Kai finds Zan, and purposely gets captured to confront Uncle Six. Meanwhile, CG meets a witness who tells her that, 15 years ago, a fire monster burned down a building with the Triad's senior leadership in it.
4	"A Twisting Snake"	Roel Reiné	David Simkins	August 8, 2019
15 years ago, Tommy, Jenny, Lu Xin, and Kai snuck into a building to get some fireworks when Uncle Six killed the Triad leaders (including Raymond Tong) to get their positions by using his fire powers. Lu Xin was burned as a result, and Tommy was held responsible. In the present day, Uncle Six nearly kills Kai, but is distracted by CG. They escape, but not before Six realizes that Kai is the Wu Assassin. Jenny and Tommy meet up with their parents, but the meeting does not go well, as their father is disappointed with the modern remodeling. Kai explains everything to CG, but CG receives a call from Lu Xin. Kai meets Ying Ying again, where she reveals that she was the first Wu Assassin, and managed to defeat all 5 Wu Lords, but was killed. Ying Ying shows Kai the statues of the 999 previous Wu Assassins, meanwhile the meeting with the Russian gang goes south and CG realizes that they will kill Lu Xin. Kai looks at a photo of Alec McCullough, recognizing him as a former Wu Assassin.
5	"Codladh Sámh"	Toa Fraser	Julie Benson & Shawna Benson	August 8, 2019
CG and Lu Xin kill all the thugs, where CG reveals that she is an undercover cop. Kai takes Tommy and Jenny to where Lu Xin and CG are, and reveals to everyone that he is the Wu Assassin. Uncle Six tries to threaten McCullough, but McCullough reveals that he is the Wood Wu Lord, and explains that he was the Wu Assassin 500 years ago. However, after the Water Wu Lord killed his wife and child, he tried to resurrect them by killing himself and then immediately returning to life as the recently fallen Wood Wu Lord, who has healing powers; however his plan failed and he was cursed with an extended lifespan. Tommy disposes of the dead bodies, while Kai and Jenny devise a plan to kill Uncle Six. The plan fails as Uncle Six knows Kai is the Wu Assassin, and offers a truce to defeat McCullough.
6	"Gu Assassins"	Toa Fraser	Cameron Litvack & John Wirth	August 8, 2019
The day before, Jenny fights Zan and loses. McCullough plans to get all five Wu Xing powers to revive his family. In the present, Uncle Six tells Kai to kill the Earth Wu to stop McCullough, in return he will let Kai remove the Fire Wu piece from Six's body. Lu Xin gathers 5 animals and sucks the poison out, then Kai performs a blood ritual with all the people affected by the Fire Wu (Tommy, Lu Xin, himself, and Jenny) which produces Gu, a poison that can remove the Fire Wu. Ying Ying objects to this, seeing it as too risky, and as a result she loses her connection to Kai. Zan takes Uncle Six to Jenny's restaurant, where they successfully remove the Fire Wu. Kai gives the Fire Wu piece to CG, and it is revealed that Zan is actually a mole for McCullough after Uncle Six insults her dreams of being the new Triad boss. She informs McCullough that Six has lost the Fire Wu and that Kai is the Wu Assassin.
7	"Legacy"	Katheryn Winnick	David Simkins & Yalun Tu	August 8, 2019
James Baxter, the Earth Wu Lord, kills a woman named Jill and her boyfriend Danny after deeming them unworthy to help save the Earth. Kai takes Uncle Six to Oregon, where Baxter lives, unaware that Lu Xin is following them. While at a diner, Kai and Uncle Six win a brawl after a waitress makes racist remarks. Six reminisces about the day he found the Fire Wu shard, which was the same day he killed a man in front of a young Kai. Uncle Six and Kai slowly repair their relationship, with Six explaining that he took Kai in because of their similar pasts. The next day, Kai confronts Baxter and kills him, with the latter warning him to keep the Earth shard away from McCullough, while Lu Xin plans to kill Uncle Six for causing the fire that burned him, but decides not to.
8	"Ladies' Night"	Tony Krantz	Julie Benson & Shawna Benson	August 8, 2019
The Metal Wu Lord meets with McCullough to get the Fire Wu piece from CG. After meeting Kai, CG gets herself arrested on purpose by taking tires off a car to see Frankie, her boss, to tell him everything. The Metal Wu Lord possesses a policewoman named Riley, and has Tommy arrested due to him owning a gun that killed Uncle Six's men (who were killed by the Russian gang). Jenny gets a voice mail from Tommy, and arrives at the police station with her lawyer. Riley shuts down the police precinct, which allows Zan to storm the building. A suspicious CG knocks Riley out and helps Jenny subdue Zan. Frankie is taken over by the Metal Wu, and McCullough captures Tommy. Before Zan can claim the Fire Wu, Jenny takes it for herself and becomes the new Fire Wu Lord. Frankie transfers the Metal Wu piece to CG, and McCullough makes a deal: Jenny must sacrifice herself to release the Fire Wu, or Tommy will die.
9	"Paths: Part 1"	Michael Nankin	David Simkins & Yalun Tu	August 8, 2019
Miss Jones, the Water Wu Lord, kills an old man after losing a poker game and steals an artifact that is a guide post to the afterlife. Zan meets with Uncle Six and tells him of the current situation: McCullough has captured CG, Tommy, and Jenny. To free them, Kai must give up the Earth Wu shard. McCullough calls Kai, but Kai hangs up on him. Uncle Six tries to recruit a Triad army, but is injured by Zan. A monk that Kai has been impersonating takes him to the Path and explains the stakes: should McCullough succeed, a major disruption in the space-time continuum that could end the world will be created. Kai and Lu Xin take out McCullough's thugs and free Jenny. Meanwhile, CG temporarily breaks free of Gideon's control, while Jenny, Kai, and Lu Xin devise a plan. When they return home, the Triad records Zan killing Uncle Six.
10	"Paths: Part 2"	Michael Nankin	Cameron Litvack & Jessica Chou	August 8, 2019
Kai and Lu Xin go to McCullough's meeting. McCullough heals Tommy, and Kai attempts to thwart McCullough's plan by giving Tommy the Earth Wu; however, McCullough reveals that to open the gate to the Dao, there must be 5 human hosts for the Wu pieces. The group is transported to the Dao, where Kai manages to gather the 5 pieces, opening a portal back to the human world. Kai and his friends fight through McCullough's henchmen, killing Gideon. Lu Xin leads the others to the portal back to the human world, except for Miss Jones (who grieves over her boyfriend's body), while Kai follows McCullough through a portal that transports him to his family. Kai tracks down McCullough and kills him. Six weeks later Lu Xin informs Kai that Zan is in Macau trying to recruit more allies, and leaves to see CG. The two share a kiss before she steals his car and drives away. A man asks Jenny to help make Chinatown a better place. Kai looks inside the envelope Lu Xin gave to him when he sees Ying Ying, who tells him that the world still needs a Wu Assassin as the building begins to shake.

== Production ==
=== Development ===
On June 29, 2018, it was announced that Netflix had given the production a series order for a ten-episode first season. The series is co-created, executive produced and co-written by John Wirth. Other executive producers include co-creator Tony Krantz and Nomadic Pictures' Chad Oakes and Mike Frislev. Stephen Fung will direct the first two episodes, with Krantz expected to helm another. In addition to playing the lead, Uwais also will serve as producer, lead martial arts and fight choreographer and stunt coordinator.

=== Casting ===
In June 2018, Uwais was cast in the lead role of Kai Jin. In the same month, it was announced that Byron Mann was cast in the series regular role as Uncle Six. In July 2018, it was announced that Tzi Ma, Tommy Flanagan, Lewis Tan and Katheryn Winnick were cast in their respective main roles of Mr. Young, Alec McCullough, Lu Xin Lee and Christine Gavin. In August 2018, it was reported that JuJu Chan and Mark Dacascos were cast in recurring roles. In October 2018, Lawrence Kao and Celia Au joined the main cast. In November 2018, it was revealed that Summer Glau was cast in the minor role of Miss Jones. In January 2019, Li Jun Li joined the main cast in the role of Jenny Wah.

=== Filming ===
Principal photography for the first season took place on location in Vancouver, Canada from August 8, 2018, to November 20, 2018.

=== Follow-up film ===
On February 26, 2021, Netflix ordered a 90-minute film project titled Wu Assassins: Fistful of Vengeance. It serves as a follow-up to the first season. Living Films was involved in the production of the film. Roel Reiné directed the film, with Cameron Litvack, Jessica Chou and Yalun Tu credited for the screenplay. After the film announcement, it was confirmed that Iko Uwais, Lewis Tan, Lawrence Kao and Juju Chan would reprise their respective roles (Kai, Lu Xin, Tommy and Zan) in Wu Assassins: Fistful of Vengeance. Additionally, it was confirmed that Pearl Thusi, Francesca Corney, Jason Tobin, Rhatha Phongam and Simon Kuke were cast in the film. Filming for Wu Assassins: Fistful of Vengeance took place in Thailand in early 2021. The film was released on February 17, 2022.

== Release ==
On July 23, 2019, the official trailer for the series was released.

== Critical reception ==
The review aggregator Rotten Tomatoes reported the first season had 83% approval rating based on 23 reviews, with an average rating of 6.79/10. The critical consensus reads "Though its story at times leaves something to be desired, Wu Assassins's exceptional choreography and bold aesthetic makes it an action packed delight."

Nick Allen for RogerEbert.com previewed the first three episodes and gave a positive review. Allen wrote: "[Wu Assassins] harnesses Uwais' energy as both a fighter and an actor in an exciting fashion, and creates a giddy opportunity for martial arts awesomeness to flourish." Stephen Harber from Den of Geek wrote: "I think this show has potential. I like the cast. I like the premise. I like the Shaw Brothers vibes and that faint odor of tokusatsu I'm picking up on, too." He suggests the show is a "guilty pleasure" but is concerned about the B-stories and side characters, which he says feels padded out. Isaac Feldberg of The Boston Globe says the show "isn't reinventing the wheel. But it does effectively showcase lead Iko Uwais" and praises the fight sequences, "brawls so carefully choreographed they play like bone-crunching ballets — "Wu" coasts on the same, all-important rule of cool every Hollywood action franchise [...] seems to have forgotten."
