= Roughshod =

Roughshod may refer to:

- Roughshod (1922 film), an American western film directed by B. Reeves Eason
- Roughshod (1949 film), an American western film directed by Mark Robson
- Roughshod, a 1951 novel by Norman A. Fox, later filmed as Gunsmoke (1953)
- Roughshod, a 1959 song by Link Wray

== See also ==
- Brutality (disambiguation)
