= Lewis Tan =

British and American actor and martial artist (born 1987)

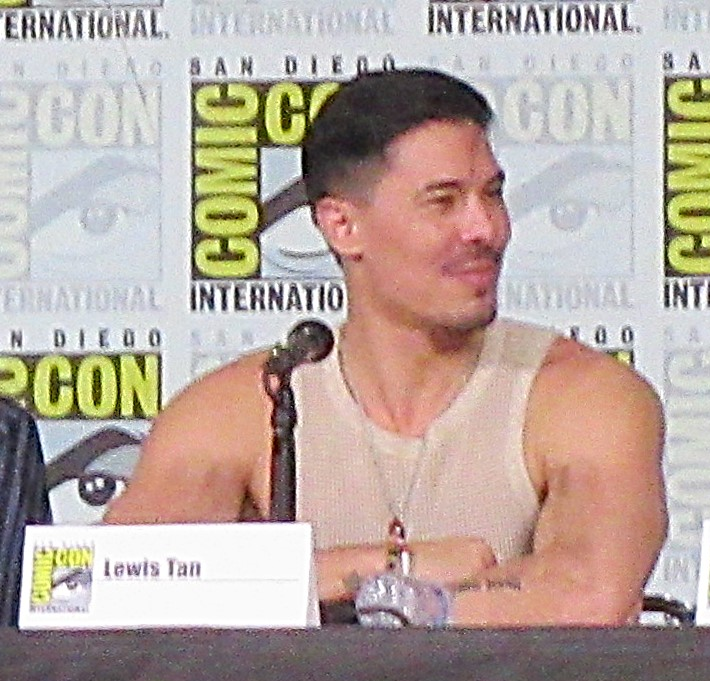
- Tan at the 2024 San Diego Comic-Con
- Born: Lewis Singwah Tan; February 4, 1987 (age 39); Salford, Greater Manchester, England
- Citizenship: United Kingdom; United States
- Occupations: Actor; stuntman; model
- Years active: 2006–present

Lewis Singwah Tan (born February 4, 1987) is a British-American actor, stunt performer, martial artist, and model. He is known for his roles as Zhou Cheng in Iron Fist, Rusty / Shatterstar in Deadpool 2 and Deadpool & Wolverine, Lu Xin Lee in Wu Assassins and its film sequel Fistful of Vengeance, Cole Young in Mortal Kombat and Mortal Kombat II, Tolya Yul-Bataar in Shadow and Bone, and Feng Xiao / Sensei Wolf in Cobra Kai.

== Early life ==
Tan was born in Salford, Greater Manchester on February 4, 1987, the eldest of four sons to Joanne Cassidy, an English retired fashion model, and Philip Tan, a Chinese Singaporean martial artist, actor, and stunt coordinator. Tan's father trained him in martial arts from a very young age. His brother Sam is an actor, his brother Ben is a director, and his brother Evan is a photographer.

At the age of one year, Tan's family moved from England to Los Angeles when his father was hired as a fight coordinator for Tim Burton's 1989 film Batman. He also lived in China, France, and Spain growing up. Tan began training in theatre in his early teens.

== Career ==
Tan had small supporting roles in films such as The Hangover Part III and Olympus Has Fallen. He began working on television shows such as CSI: Miami, CSI: NY, NCIS: Los Angeles, Hawaii Five-0, 24, and Rush Hour.

In 2016, Tan was cast in a guest role in the first season of the Netflix television series Iron Fist. He starred in the role of Zhou Cheng. In the same year, Tan was cast in the action film Den of Thieves starring Gerard Butler.

In 2018, Tan starred as Shatterstar in the superhero film Deadpool 2. Tan also starred as Gaius Chau in the third season of the AMC television series Into the Badlands. In the same year, it was announced that Tan was cast in the series regular role of Lu Xin Lee on the Netflix action crime series, Wu Assassins. Tan reprised his role in the sequel film Fistful of Vengeance; it was released on 17 February 2022.

In August 2019, Tan was cast in the Mortal Kombat film reboot as Cole Young. The film was released on 23 April 2021. He was previously involved with the Mortal Kombat media franchise when he underwent filming as Kung Jin for the unreleased web series Mortal Kombat X: Generations; Tan was recruited for the role by Garrett Warren, an experienced action director for live-action media productions. He reprised the role in Mortal Kombat II.

In April 2021, Tan was cast in the leading role of CIA officer Harris Chang on the upcoming television adaptation based on The Quantum Spy thriller novel by David Ignatius. In May 2021, Tan was cast alongside Emma Roberts in the romantic comedy About Fate, which was directed by Maryus Vaysberg.

In January 2022, it was announced that Tan would play Tolya Yul-Bataar in the second season of Netflix's Shadow and Bone.

In 2024, Tan was revealed to have joined the sixth season of Cobra Kai as a rival sensei.

Tan is known for performing his own stunts, using multiple styles including Muay Thai, Kung Fu, Jujutsu, and Japanese katana swordplay.

== Filmography ==
=== Film ===
Year	Title	Role	Notes
2006	The Fast and the Furious: Tokyo Drift	—N/a	Stunt performer
2006	Mini's First Time	Skatepunk #2	
2007	Pirates of the Caribbean: At World's End	—N/a	Stunt performer
2008	Red Velvet	Maniac	
2013	Olympus Has Fallen	Korean commando	Also stunt performer
2013	The Hangover Part III	Prison guard	Also stunt performer
2015	Sacrifice	Ben Kittman	
2018	Den of Thieves	Secret Service Lobby Guard #1	
2018	Deadpool 2	Rusty / Shatterstar	
2019	Ji	Ji	Short film
2021	Mortal Kombat	Cole Young	
2022	Fistful of Vengeance	Lu Xin Lee	
2022	About Fate	Kip	
2022	Babylon	Party Attendee	
2024	Deadpool & Wolverine	Rusty / Shatterstar	
2025	Safe House	Agent Choi	
2025	Wildcat	Roman	
2026	Mike & Nick & Nick & Alice	Roid Rage Ryan	
2026	Mortal Kombat II	Cole Young	

=== Television ===
Year	Title	Role	Notes
2006	CSI: NY	Kym Tanaka	
2007	Day Break	Jimmy Yan	Also stunt double
2007	24	—N/a	Stunt double
2010	CSI: Miami	Aiko Okanagi	
2011	NCIS: Los Angeles	Hiro Yakuza	
2011	The Protector	Zachary	
2013	The Girlfriend	Bruce Wayne / Batman	Short film
2014	10,000 Days	Jiro Farnwell	Television film
2015	Hawaii Five-0	Luke Nakano	Episode: "Ka Makau Kaa Kaua"
2016	Rush Hour	Chen	Episode 5
2017	Iron Fist	Zhou Cheng	Episode: "The Blessing of Many Fractures"
2018–2019	Into the Badlands	Gaius Chau	Main cast (season 3)
2019	Wu Assassins	Lu Xin Lee	Main cast
2022	Bling Empire	Himself	
2023	Shadow and Bone	Tolya Yul-Bataar	Main cast (season 2)
2024–2025	Cobra Kai	Feng Xiao / Sensei Wolf	Recurring role (season 6)
TBA	Quantum Spy	Harris Chang	Lead role
