= Bear (2010 film) =

- Directed by: John Rebel
- Written by: Roel Reiné; Ethan Wiley
- Produced by: Freddie Wong; Alicia Martin; Roel Reiné; Ethan Wiley
- Starring: Katie Lowes; Brendan Michael Coughlin; Mary Alexandra Stiefvater
- Cinematography: Roel Reiné
- Edited by: Herman P. Koerts
- Music by: Trevor Morris
- Production companies: Wiseacre Films; Rebel Film BV
- Distributed by: A-Film Distribution
- Release date: June 4, 2010 (United Kingdom)
- Running time: 80 minutes
- Country: United States
- Language: English
- Budget: $10 million

Bear is a 2010 American natural horror film directed by Roel Reiné (under the pseudonym of John Rebel) and starring Patrick Scott Lewis and Katie Lowes. The film centers on four people who become the target of an extremely aggressive and wrathful grizzly bear.

== Plot ==
Businessman Sam, along with his wife Liz, his musician brother Nick, and Nick's girlfriend Christine, drive to their father's birthday dinner in a minivan. Several miles into a back road shortcut, they get a flat tire. With no cellphone signal to call for help, they have to replace the tire themselves. Sam berates Nick for his choice of career, as well as his fling with Christine.

As they are arguing, they are approached by a grizzly bear. Ignoring Nick's efforts to convince the group to calmly leave, Sam kills the bear with his handgun. However, a larger male bear charges at them in revenge. After the group take refuge in their minivan, the bear overturns the vehicle.

After a while, the bear leaves, and they turn the minivan over. But as they start driving, the axles break, stranding them. The group proceeds on foot, but the bear chases them to an out-of-ground pipe. After a while, they leave the pipe to return for their vehicle. The bear ambushes them again, this time catching and killing Christine while the rest helplessly watch.

Nick is convinced the bear is taking out his revenge on them, citing a Native American belief that bears are Shaman's reincarnated spirits and capable of human thoughts and emotion. Sam dismisses this and they plan to trap the bear in the minivan. The trap is sprung, but Nick is nearly killed by the bear, forcing Sam and Liz to release it then retreat back into the vehicle themselves.

Sam opts as a marathon runner to jog the several miles to the restaurant, but when he arrives he is attacked by the bear before he can get help. Meanwhile, Liz tells Nick that she and Sam have been having serious financial troubles which has caused a rift in their marriage. Sam is in debt and under scrutiny for embezzling from his company, which was why he gave their father a Porsche (as the banks wouldn't be able to collect it).

The bear drags Sam back to the minivan and released him. Nick surmises there must be a reason Sam had been returned, and Liz reveals that she's pregnant. Nick realizes that he is the father, from an affair he and Liz had months prior.

This breaks Sam's heart as Nick realizes the true reason the bear had locked all three of them together; Nick, realizing that Liz might be happier with Sam, offers to sacrifice himself and attack the bear so the other two can escape. As Nick is dying, Sam gives Liz a parting kiss and attempts to attack the bear with a stick, but is killed as well.

The bear then approaches Liz, who sinks to her knees as the bear sniffs her, closing her eyes ready to die. But the attack never comes, and the bear instead leaves her alone, likely having sensed her pregnancy, further acknowledging the Shaman legend. As she begins down the road by herself, the camera turns to the bodies of Sam and Nick lying next to each other and the screen goes black.

== Cast ==
- Katie Lowes as Christine
- Mary Alexandra Stiefvater as Liz
- Patrick Scott Lewis as Sam
- Brendan Michael Coughlin as Nick
- The bear was played by “Blue”, an adult male grizzly bear provided by Bear–Necessities Ranch

== Release ==
The film was released on DVD on January 1, 2010. It was later re-released that same year both on DVD and Blu-ray by Otter Creek Motion Pictures on September 28.

== Reception ==
The film received mostly negative reviews from critics. Digital Retribution gave the film a score of 2.5 out of 5, criticizing the film's poor acting, inane script, unlikable characters and unintentional humor. Dread Central awarded the film a negative score of 2 1/2 out of 5, criticizing the film's long dull stretches, but complimented the film's generation of pathos for the characters during the finale. HorrorNews.net gave the film a negative review, criticizing the film's sloppy production, poor lighting, and weak execution, but complimented the film's acting.
