= Deadwater (film) =

- Film poster
- Directed by: Roel Reiné
- Written by: Roel Reiné; Ethan Wiley
- Produced by: Ethan Wiley; Roel Reiné
- Starring: Gary Stretch; Lance Henriksen; James Russo
- Narrated by: Rebel Wan
- Cinematography: Roel Reiné
- Edited by: Radu Ion; Bayard Stryker
- Music by: Joseph Bauer
- Production companies: Wiseacre Films; Rebel Film BV
- Distributed by: Film and Music Entertainment
- Release date: May 20, 2008
- Running time: 100 minutes
- Country: United States
- Language: English
- Budget: $350,000

Deadwater a.k.a. Black Ops a.k.a. Nazi Dawn in the United Kingdom, is a 2008 horror film written and produced by Ethan Wiley, it was directed by Roel Reiné and stars Lance Henriksen, Gary Stretch, James Russo, D. C. Douglas and Jim Hanks. The film was produced by Wiseacre Films and Rebel Film and released in the US by First Look Studios.

== Plot ==
Secret U.S. military interrogations of suspected terrorists are being conducted on an American World War II-era ship in the Persian Gulf. After mysterious sounds are heard on the ship, an unexplained force kills the crew. When contact with the ship is lost, the U.S. military sends a team of Marines and two scientists to investigate. When they land on the ship, they discover that almost all the crew have been killed. The team, led by Col. John Willets (Lance Henriksen), cannot make contact with command, while the ship drifts toward Iranian waters. Willets interrogates one of the scientists and learns that the mysterious force is the ghost of a Nazi officer who was created to be a secret weapon. The ghost, which has strong psychic powers, is trapped on the ship and the two scientists were sent to try to capture it. Meanwhile, the supposed terrorist being interrogated onboard turns out to be an MIT-educated decoy (who was forced to impersonate a terrorist). He aids in the efforts to destroy the ghost, before being killed by it.

== Cast ==
- Lance Henriksen as Colonel John Willets
- Gary Stretch as Colin Willets
- James Russo as Commander Combs
- Katherine Randolph as Traci Leonard
- D.C. Douglas as Larry Grubman
- Jim Hanks as Ensign Buford
- Matthew Alan as Lieutenant Chris McCloskey
- David Hutchison as Navy Seal #1
- Richard Jenik as Lieutenant Ricks
- John Karyus as Present Day Captain
- Paul Lacovara as Navy Seal #2
- Grant Mathis as Gunther Neumann
- Robert Pike Daniel as Slab
- Lee Majdoub as Fahdawi / Khalil
- Tom McCafferty as Lieutenant Jackson
- P. David Miller as World War II Intelligence Officer
- Tracy Miller as CIA Agent #1
- Freddy Douglas as CIA Agent #2
- Daniel Louis Rivas as Lieutenant Swanson
- Jonathan Espolin as Lieutenant Commander Alberts

== Production ==
An example of low-budget guerrilla filmmaking, the film cost a reported $350,000 and was shot in 15 days using a couple of Panasonic HVX-200 HD digital cameras. The producers secured a restored museum victory ship docked in Los Angeles and shot mostly at night, after museum patrons had left. Luckily the ship made a trip to a World War II San Diego event, affording the producers to get "at sea" footage for free. All the guns were plastic models, so all the muzzle flashes and sound effects were laid in later. Director Roel Reine does a commentary with all this information.

== Release ==
The film premiered on 20 July 2008 as direct to video production over First Look Studios.
