= Antony Szeto =

Australian-born director, producer, martial artist (born 1964)

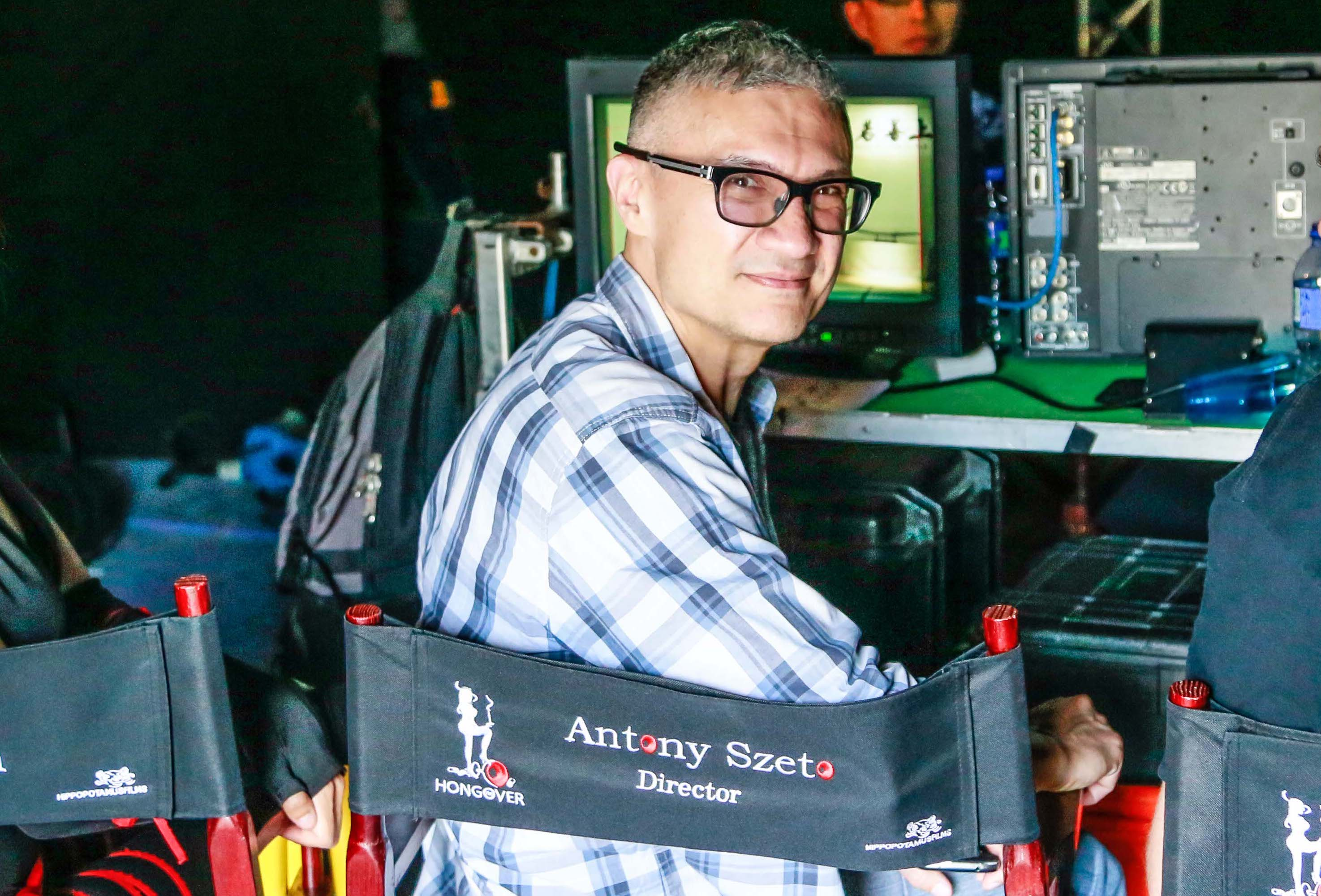
- Szeto directing in Hong Kong
- Born: 9 December 1964 (age 61); Sydney, Australia
- Education: Bond University, Beijing Sport University, University of Hull
- Occupations: Director, martial artist, actor, stunt coordinator
- Years active: 1986–present
- Spouse: JuJu Chan Szeto (m. 2019)

Chinese name
- Traditional Chinese: 司徒永華
- Simplified Chinese: 司徒永华
Transcriptions
Standard Mandarin
- Hanyu Pinyin: Sītú yǒng huá
- Musical career
- Instruments: Guitar, saxophone
- Website: antonyszeto.com

Antony Szeto (司徒永華), (born 9 December 1964) is a film director and martial artist.

== Early life and education ==
Szeto was born in Sydney, Australia. He studied martial arts at Beijing Sport University and ended up representing Australia at the International Invitational Wushu Championships in Hangzhou in 1988. Upon graduation, he returned to Australia and double-majored in film and finance at Bond University, going to the United Kingdom for his master's degree. His family started in ship repairing, which later developed into high-speed ship construction. It was founded by his father, Szeto Fai, a merchant politician and People's Congress of China member.

== Career ==
Szeto directed Hong Kong's first CGI animated feature film, DragonBlade (2005). Voiced by Daniel Wu, Karen Mok, Stephen Fung and Sandra Ng, DragonBlade earned a Golden Horse Awards nomination and won an award from the Australian Directors Guild. Szeto also directed a family action film produced by Jackie Chan, Jackie Chan Presents: Wushu (2008) starring Sammo Hung and Max Zhang. In 2011, Szeto was hired by the Hollywood producer Roger Corman to direct two films, Palace of the Damned (2013) and Fist of the Dragon (2014). Szeto was also stunt coordinator for The Meg.

== Personal life ==
On 1 October 2019, Szeto married actress JuJu Chan Szeto in Los Angeles.

== Filmography ==
Year	Title	Role	Notes
2001	Podipods: Shorts	Director	TV series
2005	Taped (Short)	Director	Starring Maggie Q
2005	DragonBlade (animation)	Director	
2008	Jackie Chan Presents: Wushu	Director	Produced by Jackie Chan, Starring Sammo Hung
2010	The Blood Bond	Co-Director	
2013	Palace of the Damned	Director	Produced by Roger Corman
2013	Wing Chun Xiao Long	Director	Released in Mainland China
2014	Fist of the Dragon	Director	Produced by Roger Corman
2016	Plan Chang Feng Yun Zhi Yuan Jia Jie Mei	Director	Released in Mainland China
