= Ethan Wiley =

American film director

- Born: United States
- Occupations: Screenwriter, film director, film producer
- Notable work: House, House 2: The Second Story, Children of the Corn V: Fields of Terror, Journey to the Forbidden Valley

Ethan Wiley is an American screenwriter, film producer, director and musician.

Wiley wrote the screenplay for the 1985 film House and has written and directed several other horror films, including, House II: The Second Story, Children of the Corn V: Fields of Terror, starring David Carradine and Eva Mendes, Blackwater Valley Exorcism and Brutal, starring Jeffrey Combs, Michael Berryman and Sarah Thompson.

In 2006, Wiley formed Wiseacre Films, an independent production company. Producing credits include Blackwater Valley Exorcism,A Dead Calling, "Drifter", Brutal, Deadwater (a.k.a. Black Ops), Bear and The Butterfly Room. Wiley was the co-writer, director and producer of the family comedy movie Elf-Man and the Chinese action-adventure feature Journey to the Forbidden Valley Ethan was a Production Consultant for the Universal Pictures action film The Man with the Iron Fists 2, and teleplay writer for Universal's Dead Again in Tombstone.

Earlier in his career, Wiley worked as a special effects artist and puppeteer on Return of the Jedi, Gremlins and Romancing the Stone. Among the many screenplays Wiley wrote for a variety of studios and production companies, Wiley wrote an early draft of Spider-Man"

Wiley is currently the President of the William T. Wiley Foundation, a 501(c)(3) organization, devoted to supporting arts education and furthering the legacy of his father, modern artist William T. Wiley.

== Music career ==
Wiley is a mandolin and mandocello player. He composed and produced the instrumental CD, Take A Stand, featuring Jon Sholle (guitar), Joe Craven (percussion), Jim Whitney (bass) and Joyce Andersen (violin). Ethan composed and performed two songs for the soundtrack of Jason X, has contributed mandolin, mandocello and guitar to other feature film soundtracks, and has performed and recorded with various singer-songwriters and bands.

In 2021, Wiley debuted the Virtuosity Podcast on Spotify and YouTube, with musician Timo Shanko, exploring the world of musical virtuosity.

== Partial filmography ==
- Return of the Jedi
- Gremlins
- House
- House II: The Second Story
- Children of the Corn V: Fields of Terror
- Blackwater Valley Exorcism
- Brutal
- Deadwater
- Bear
- The Butterfly Room
- Elf-Man
- The Man with the Iron Fists 2
- Dead Again in Tombstone
- Journey to the Forbidden Valley
