= JuJu Chan =

Hong Kong-American actress

JuJu Chan Szeto
- Born: British Hong Kong
- Other name: JuJu Chan
- Education: University of San Francisco (BS); New York University, Tisch School of the Arts (MA)
- Occupations: Actress; martial artist; model; singer; writer
- Years active: 2008–present
- Spouse: Antony Szeto (m. 2019)

Chinese name
- Traditional Chinese: 司徒鈺芸
- Simplified Chinese: 司徒钰芸
Transcriptions
Standard Mandarin
- Hanyu Pinyin: Sītú Yùyún
Yue: Cantonese
- Jyutping: Sito Juk6-wan4
- Musical career
- Instrument: Piano
- Website: jujuchanszeto.com

JuJu Chan Szeto (Chinese: 司徒鈺芸) also known as JuJu Chan (Chinese: 陳鈺芸), is an American actress, martial artist, singer, and writer.

Chan pursued martial arts at a young age, an interest she kept up with into adulthood. She started modeling when she was a teenager, and entered the film industry after receiving her master's degree from NYU Tisch School of the Arts. Chan received wider recognition as Silver Dart Shi in Netflix's Crouching Tiger, Hidden Dragon: Sword of Destiny (2016). She later returned to Netflix as Zan in Wu Assassins (2019). She has been called the "female Bruce Lee".

== Early life and education ==
Chan was born in Hong Kong. At the age of three, she moved to the United States and settled in San Francisco.

She began to learn martial arts at the age of 10. She first started in judo, as that was the closest school at the time, and went on to learn Shotokan karate, wushu, Hung Ga, Wing Chun, ITF Taekwondo, nunchaku, and muay Thai.

Chan graduated from the University of San Francisco with a bachelor’s degree in computer science and mathematics, with honors. She gained a master's degree from NYU Tisch School of the Arts.

== Entertainment career ==
In August 2009, Chan participated in the RTHK reality series Rich Mate Poor Mate (Chinese: 窮富翁大作戰), where four participants from wealthy backgrounds experience the lives of the not so fortunate. During the 120-hour experience, Chan (nicknamed "The Beauty Queen") has to live the life of a single immigrant mother in Hong Kong while taking care of her eight-year-old boy.

Chan starred as the title character in the 2009 web series Lumina, written and directed by Jennifer Thym. She has one of the lead roles, Ping Wei, the head concubine, in the thriller Palace of the Damned (previously named The Living Dead) in 2012. Chan also played the lead actress, Pixie Ho, in an Australian-Chinese Production, Hit Girls, an action comedy short film.

Chan starred as Silver Dart Shi in Crouching Tiger, Hidden Dragon: Sword of Destiny directed by Yuen Woo Ping. Chan was the lead actress in Savage Dog released in July 2017.

In August 2018, it was announced that Chan was cast as a recurring character on the Netflix series, Wu Assassins (2019). She played Triad lieutenant Zan Hui. It was announced in February 2021 that she would reprise her role in the sequel film, Fistful of Vengeance. It was later released on 17 February 2022.

In June 2019, Chan joined Dimitri Logothetis's martial arts thriller Jiu Jitsu (2020).

== Martial arts career ==
In 2013 she represented Hong Kong in the Taekwon-Do (ITF) World Championship in Bulgaria.

== Pageant career ==
In July 2009, she participated in the United Nations Pageants International in Jamaica, where she won Miss Congeniality and Miss United Nation International Ambassador.

== Music ==
=== Discography ===
- I Wanna Hold Your Heart (2011)

Release date: 5 December 2011
Songs：

1. 那些年的我們
2. 好勝
3. 瞬間救地球
4. I Wanna Hold Your Heart

=== Music awards ===
- 2011 – Hong Kong Metro Radio New Singer Award (2011年度新城勁爆頒獎禮 – 新城勁爆新登場海外歌手)
- 2011 – Hong Kong uChannel Teens most favorite new singer Award (2011uChannel我撐起樂壇頒獎禮 – 我最喜愛女新人獎)

== Other work ==
In 2010, Chan became the spokesperson and ambassador of Heroes2, a charity organization which focuses on reforestation throughout the areas of rural China.

Chan has also written her first semi-autobiography To Live a Beautiful Life, releasing it in June 2010. Her second book, published in 2013, is a guide to Western dining called "Food and Ordering at a Restaurant".

== Personal life ==
She has a twin sister. On 1 October 2019, Chan married frequent collaborator Antony Szeto in Los Angeles.

== Filmography ==
Year	Title	Alternative title	Role	Notes	Ref.
2008	The Other End of the Gun		Sabrina (Supporting role)		
2009	Found and Lost (short)		Eva (Lead role)		
2009	Gong Neui! (short)	港女!	Princess (lead role)	Also producer	
2010	Joggers		JuJu (Supporting role)		
2010	Unconditional Love (action)		Julie (Supporting role)	Chinese Kung Fu Fighter	
2010	Vela 724 (sci-fi action promo)		Princess (Lead role)		
2012	The Young Boxer (action)	《詠春小龍》	Bruce Lee's Sister		
2012	Palace of the Damned (Horror)		Ping Wei (Main Cast)		
2012	Hit Girls (Action Comedy)	《职业女杀手》	Pixie Ho (Lead role)		
2013	Fist of the Dragon (Action)	《猛龍追擊8小時》	Meili (Lead actress)		
2014	Sports Like No Other	《別有動天 第 14 集 演員與跆拳道運動員之間的矛盾》	Main	Credited as JuJu Chan 陳鈺芸	
2016	Crouching Tiger, Hidden Dragon: Sword of Destiny	《臥虎藏龍2》	Silver Dart Shi	Credited as JuJu Chan 陳鈺芸	
2017	Savage Dog		Isabelle Steiner	Credited as JuJu Chan 陳鈺芸	
2018	Lucid Dreams			Credited as JuJu Chan 陳鈺芸	
2019	The Invincible Dragon		Lady	Credited as JuJu Chan 陳鈺芸	
2019	Hollow Point		Amanda Ray	Credited as JuJu Chan 陳鈺芸	
2019	Iron Fists and Kung Fu Kicks		Herself		
2020	Jiu Jitsu		Carmen		
2022	Fistful of Vengeance		Zan Hui	Credited as JuJu Chan	
2024	Lights Out				
2025	Fight or Flight		Master Lian		

=== Television ===
Year	Title	Alternative Title	Role	Network	Notes	Ref.
2009	Lumina		Lumina Wong (Lead role)			
2009	Rich Mate Poor Mate	窮富翁大作戰	JuJu (Herself, 選美天后)	RTHK	Documentary, Credited as JuJu Chan 陳鈺芸	
2014	Kung Fu Quest 3	《功夫傳奇 3》	Main	RTHK	Credited as JuJu Chan 陳鈺芸	
2019	Wu Assassins		Zan Hui	Netflix	Credited as JuJu Chan 陳鈺芸	
2019	Noches con Platanito		Herself	Estrella TV (Spanish)		
2021	Fight'n Chance		Host			

== Bibliography ==
Year	Title	Alternative	Publisher	Notes
2010	To Live a Beautiful Life	美麗是活出來的	青馬	Semi-autobiography, Rich Mate Poor Mate, as JuJu Chan 陳鈺芸
2011	Rich Mate Poor Mate	窮滋味	Enrich Publishing	Book on Rich Mate Poor Mate, as JuJu Chan 陳鈺芸
2013	Food & Ordering at a Restaurant	點菜英文	Red Publish	Western Dining Tool Book, as JuJu Chan 陳鈺芸
