= Jasmine (film) =

Film by Dax Phelan

- Directed by: Dax Phelan
- Written by: Dax Phelan
- Produced by: Dax Phelan; Eric M. Klein; Chris Chan Lee; Stratton Leopold; Martin Strachan; Jason Tobin; Jennifer Thym
- Starring: Jason Tobin; Byron Mann; Eugenia Yuan
- Cinematography: Guy Livneh
- Edited by: Chris Chan Lee
- Music by: Shie Rozow
- Production company: Shanghai Street Films
- Distributed by: Lionsgate; Indican Pictures
- Release date: March 25, 2015 (Hong Kong International Film Festival)
- Running time: 85 minutes
- Country: United States
- Language: English

Jasmine is a 2015 American drama film by director Dax Phelan. Set in Hong Kong, the story is about a man who is struggling to come to terms with the unsolved murder of his wife and his growing obsession with the man he believes is responsible. The film premiered at the Hong Kong International Film Festival on March 25, 2015 and has since screened in numerous film festivals around the world and won multiple awards. It was later released to video by Indican Pictures in 2017.

== Plot ==
A year after his wife's murder, once-successful Hong Kong businessman Leonard To (Jason Tobin) is still reeling from the tragedy. Having lost his job, friends, and all sense of order in his life, Leonard becomes obsessed with a mysterious stranger he sees at his wife's grave, believing him to be responsible for her death.

== Cast ==
- Jason Tobin as Leonard To
- Byron Mann as The Suspect
- Sarah Lian as Anna
- Eugenia Yuan as Grace
- Glen China as Doctor Wu

== Production ==
Lon Haber & Company announced the launch of the film in 2014.

== Release ==
Jasmine premiered on March 25, 2015 at the Hong Kong International Film Festival. On April 28, 2015 it screened at the Los Angeles Asian Pacific Film Festival, where it won 5 awards including the grand jury prize for best picture. It has subsequently screened at 50 film festivals around the world.

== Critical response ==
Jasmine received mixed reviews. On Rotten Tomatoes the film has 4 reviews, 2 positive and 2 negative.

Noel Murray of the Los Angeles Times wrote that Jasmine's "evocative scenes of urban life and Tobin's powerful performance provide ample compensation. Plot twists or no, this is a vivid depiction of a lost soul." Deborah Young of The Hollywood Reporter wrote that Jasmine "has its harrowing moments, but the psychological thriller Jasmine is an impenetrable mystery for most of its running time, and deliberately so...For a low budget indie, it cultivates a nicely sophisticated genre look." Ezra Emerson of Screen Anarchy said, "Many a psychological thriller will sag at some point, yet script, acting and cutting conspire to keep you pinned to your chair for the duration of Jasmine. This film represents not only a fine debut feather in Phelan's directorial cap, but could become a role model in Hong Kong's languishing indie film industry.

== Home video ==
Jasmine was released nationwide on DVD and on video on demand services by Indican Pictures on May 12, 2017.
