= Brutalism (disambiguation) =

Brutalist architecture is an architectural style that emerged during the 1950s in the United Kingdom.

Brutalism or brutalist may also refer to:

- Brutalism (Idles album)
- Brutalism (The Drums album) or its eponymous title track
- "Brutalism", song by Jean-Michel Jarre from the album Oxymore
- "Brutalist" (song), by Kim Petras
- The Brutalist, drama film

== See also ==
- Brutalismus 3000, German musical group
- Brutality (disambiguation)
