= Paolo Montalban =

Filipino-American actor & singer (born 1973)

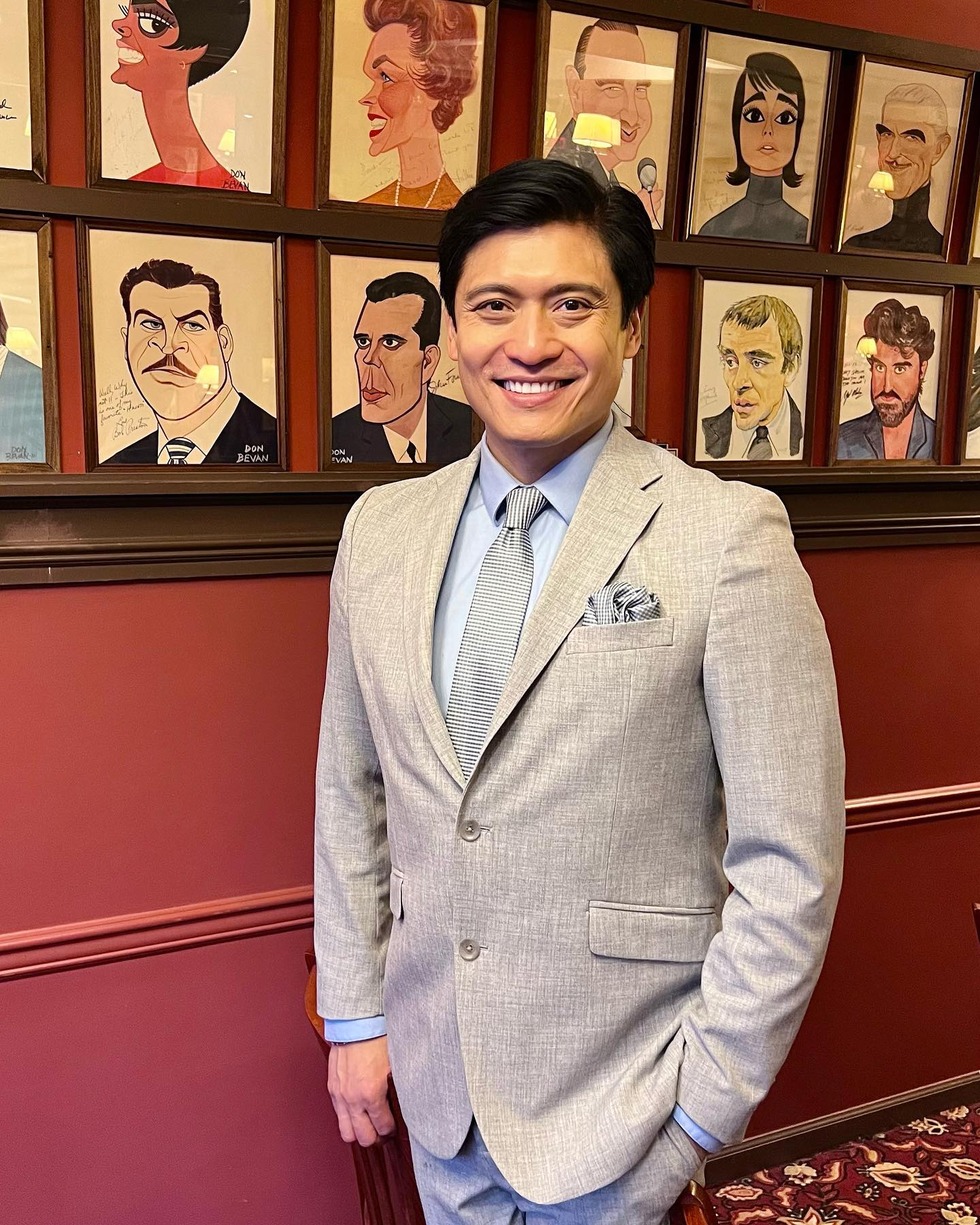
- Montalban in 2023
- Born: May 21, 1973 (age 53); Manila, Philippines
- Education: St. Peter's Preparatory School
- Alma mater: Rutgers University (BS)
- Occupations: Actor, singer
- Years active: 1997–present
- Notable work: Cinderella (1997); Mortal Kombat: Conquest (1998–1999)

Paolo Montalban (born May 21, 1973) is an American actor and singer best known for his performance in the 1997 Disney television film Rodgers & Hammerstein's Cinderella as Prince Christopher, opposite Brandy as Cinderella and Whitney Houston as the Fairy Godmother. He reprised that role in a stage version of the musical with Deborah Gibson and then Jamie-Lynn Sigler as Cinderella and Eartha Kitt as the Fairy Godmother.

== Personal life ==
Montalban was born in Manila, Philippines, to Paul and Vivian Montalban. His family immigrated to the United States when he was a year old and lived in a studio apartment in Manhattan's West Side across the street from The Juilliard School and Lincoln Center for the Performing Arts. He is an alumnus of St. Peter's Preparatory School and holds a degree in pre-med psychology from Rutgers University.

On December 6th, 2025, Paolo announced his engagement to Yoanna Nikolova on Instagram.

== Career ==
In 1997, Montalban starred in Cinderella as Prince Christopher alongside Whitney Houston, Whoopi Goldberg, and Brandy. He also played Kung Lao (ancestor of Kung Lao) in the syndicated series Mortal Kombat: Conquest along with Daniel Bernhardt and Kristanna Loken.

Montalban was also cast in John Dahl's The Great Raid as Sgt. Valera, and played Raul in the independent film American Adobo. He also appeared in Just Wright starring Queen Latifah, The Adjustment Bureau, and the short film Two Weeks.

Montalban was named one of People's 50 Most Beautiful People of 1998.

He has appeared on Broadway in Pacific Overtures, The King and I and Breakfast at Tiffany's, starring Emilia Clarke. Off-Broadway, he was in Two Gentlemen of Verona at Shakespeare in the Park, The Romance of Magno Rubio at Ma Yi Theater Company, among others. He also guest starred in Law & Order: Special Victims Unit (season 8, episode 20: "Annihilated") and One Life to Live.

Montalban has appeared in productions of The King and I on Broadway and around the country, where he has played both Lun Tha, the young lover, and the title role of the King. In 2022, Montalban starred as Captain Von Trapp in the Dallas Theater Center production of The Sound of Music at the Dee and Charles Wyly Theatre. On March 28, 2023, he succeeded Peter Francis James as Florenz Ziegfeld in the Broadway revival of Funny Girl and remained with the show until it closed on September 3 of that year.

He reunited with Brandy in the Disney+ movie Descendants: The Rise of Red, part of the Descendants franchise, which premiered July 12, 2024. He reprised the role in Descendants: Wicked Wonderland in 2026.

On January 17, 2024, he originated the role of Kurt Huber in the world premiere of the off-Broadway musical White Rose.. In 2026, he makes his London debut as Soichiro Yagami in Death Note: The Musical at London's Barbican Theatre.

== Filmography ==
=== Film ===
Year	Title	Role	Notes
2001	American Adobo	Raul	
2005	The Great Raid	Sgt. Valera	
2010	Just Wright	Sommelier	
2012	Two Weeks	Dad	Short film
2020	The Girl Who Left Home	Tony	
2023	Asian Persuasion	Lee-Kwan Lee	
2024	Descendants: The Rise of Red	King Charming	
2026	Descendants: Wicked Wonderland	King Charming	

=== Television ===
Year	Title	Role	Notes
1997	Cinderella	Prince Christopher	Television film
1998–1999	Mortal Kombat: Conquest	Kung Lao	22 episodes
2007	Law & Order: Special Victims Unit	Wahid	Episode: "Annihilated"
2010	One Life to Live	Tahiti Cop #1	1 episode
2013	City of Dreams	Paolo Montalban	Episode: "The Ballad of Ofagina"
2015	Madam Secretary	Military Tech	2 episodes
2015	Nurse Jackie	Second Investigator	Episode: "Jackie and the Wolf"
2015	The Blacklist	Forensic Agent	Episode: "Arioch Cain"

== Theatre ==
Year	Title	Role	Venue	Notes
1998	The King and I	Lun Tha	Neil Simon Theatre	Revival Broadway Cast
2004	Pacific Overtures	Manjiro	Studio 54	Revival Broadway Cast
2005	Two Gentlemen of Verona	Eglamour	Delacorte Theater	Off-Broadway
2013	Breakfast at Tiffany's	u/s Jose, u/s Yunioshi	Cort Theatre	Original Broadway Cast
2017	Bella: An American Tall Tale	Tommie Haw/Skeeter	Playwrights Horizons	Off-Broadway World Premiere; Nominated - Lucille Lortel Award for Outstanding Featured Actor in a Musical
2020	The Unsinkable Molly Brown	Arthur	Abrons Arts Center (Transport Group)	Original Off-Broadway Cast
2023	Funny Girl	Florenz Ziegfeld	August Wilson Theatre	Broadway Replacement
2024	White Rose: The Musical	Professor Kurt Huber	Theatre Row	Original Off-Broadway Cast
2026	Death Note: The Musical	Soichiro Yagami	Barbican Theatre	Original London Cast

== Discography ==
All credits adapted from Apple Music and Spotify.

=== As featured artist ===
==== Singles ====
Year	Title	Album	Writer(s)	Producer(s)
2025	"Capricorn (Gravity)" (Retrograde The Musical featuring Paolo Montalban)	Retrograde The Musical (Studio Cast Recording)	Nick Laughlin, Richard C. Walter, Drew Louis, Jesse Saint John	Drew Louis
2025	"Sale" (Christine Toy Johnson featuring Jasmine Forsberg, Michael K. Lee, Cecilia Lin, and Paolo Montalban)	Fusong	Cecilia Lin, Christine Toy Johnson	No producer credited
2024	"So This Is Love" (Brandy featuring Paolo Montalban)	Descendants: The Rise of Red (Original Soundtrack)	Al Hoffman, Jerry Livingston, Mack David	TheRon "Neff-U" Feemster
2022	"I Ain't Down Yet" (The Cast of The Unsinkable Molly Brown featuring Paolo Montalban)	The Unsinkable Molly Brown (The New Off-Broadway Cast Recording)	Meredith Willson	Michael Croiter, Michael Rafter, Dick Scanlan
2022	"Just Becuz" (The Cast of The Unsinkable Molly Brown featuring Paolo Montalban)	The Unsinkable Molly Brown (The New Off-Broadway Cast Recording)	Meredith Willson	Michael Croiter, Michael Rafter, Dick Scanlan
2022	"I've A'ready Started In" (The Cast of The Unsinkable Molly Brown featuring Paolo Montalban)	The Unsinkable Molly Brown (The New Off-Broadway Cast Recording)	Meredith Willson	Michael Croiter, Michael Rafter, Dick Scanlan
2022	"Belly up to the Bar, Boys" (The Cast of The Unsinkable Molly Brown featuring Paolo Montalban)	The Unsinkable Molly Brown (The New Off-Broadway Cast Recording)	Meredith Willson	Michael Croiter, Michael Rafter, Dick Scanlan
2022	"He's My Friend" (The Cast of The Unsinkable Molly Brown featuring Paolo Montalban)	The Unsinkable Molly Brown (The New Off-Broadway Cast Recording)	Meredith Willson	Michael Croiter, Michael Rafter, Dick Scanlan
2005	"My Lord Governer of Uraga, You Have Saved My Life" (Stephen Sondheim featuring Michael K. Lee and Paolo Montalban)	Pacific Overtures (The New Broadway Cast Recording)	Stephen Sondheim	No producer credited

== See also ==
- Filipinos in the New York metropolitan area
