= Journey to the Forbidden Valley =

2017 film

Journey to the Forbidden Valley is a 2017 feature film directed by Ethan Wiley produced entirely in mainland China. It was the first "creature film" ever approved for official Co-Production status in China. The screenplay was by Chris Walas and Ethan Wiley, and produced by Ethan Wiley and Rene Seegers. Chris Walas also designed and fabricated the creature effects for the film.

== Plot summary ==
After a small airplane crash lands in a remote area of Central China, several passengers survive, including a Chinese boy and his American guardian. As they wait to be rescued, they soon encounter the mysterious Yeren-- an elusive ape-man creature rumored to have inhabited the Shennongjia mountains for many centuries. When ruthless poachers arrive to capture the Yeren, our heroes must decide if the unique creature is their friend or foe.
