= Fistful of Vengeance =

2022 American film by Roel Reiné

- Promotional release poster
- Directed by: Roel Reiné
- Written by: Cameron Litvack; Jessica Chou; Yalun Tu
- Based on: Wu Assassins by: John Wirth; Tony Krantz
- Produced by: Yalun Tu
- Starring: Iko Uwais; Lewis Tan; Lawrence Kao; Pearl Thusi; Rhatha Phongam; JuJu Chan; Francesca Corney; Jason Tobin; Simon Kuke
- Cinematography: Roel Reiné
- Edited by: Michael England
- Music by: Toby Chu
- Production company: Living Films
- Distributed by: Netflix
- Release date: February 17, 2022
- Running time: 95 minutes
- Country: United States
- Language: English

Fistful of Vengeance is a 2022 American supernatural action thriller film directed by Roel Reiné, and written by Cameron Litvack, Jessica Chou and Yalun Tu. The film serves as a follow-up to the first season of the television series Wu Assassins, and stars Iko Uwais, Lewis Tan, Lawrence Kao, Rhatha Phongam, JuJu Chan, Pearl Thusi, Francesca Corney, Jason Tobin and Simon Kuke. The film was released worldwide on February 17, 2022, on Netflix.

== Plot ==
Kai, Lu Xin and Tommy travel to Bangkok to hunt down the killer of Tommy's sister Jenny, having found on her body an ancient talisman that leads them to Thailand. There, biotech billionaire William Pan approaches them, requesting that they bring to him his twin sister, underworld boss Ku An Qi, a jiangshi who has been consuming massive amounts of qi to expand her supernatural powers in order to take over the world. William explains to them that he and Ku are descendants of Pangu, the being who had shaped the universe, whom the first Wu Assassin killed after he went mad with power and whose essence is now contained within two talisman: one in the possession of William and the other Tommy had found on Jenny, which had formerly belonged to Ku. William tells them that Ku had killed Jenny while searching for Kai, the current Wu Assassin, but lost her talisman in a fight with her, and that now he can use both talisman to depower Ku and restore order to the universe. The trio agree to help William.

Joined by Tommy's friend Preeya, the group plan to kidnap Ku from a meeting with the city's Triad bosses. However Ku uses mind control to make everyone in the building attack the group, while Kai is ambushed by long-time foe Zan, who is also working for Ku. They escape with the help of Zama, an Interpol agent also after Ku and Lu Xin's former lover. The group eventually make their way to the safety of Preeya's village, where the village shaman tells them that William is actually secretly working with Ku to attempt to reform Pangu so they can remake the world in their image. To do so, they require both talisman and Kai's qi.

William and Ku persuade Preeya to steal the talisman from Tommy by offering to bring her dead family back to life, and she uses it to absorb some of Kai's qi. The village is attacked by Ku's men but Kai, Lu Xin, Tommy and Zama escape. The group tracks down William and Ku to an archaeological dig site where the first Wu Assassin fought Pangu. A remorseful Preeya helps Tommy and Zama defeat Ku, while Kai fights and kills Zan. However with Kai's qi William manages to reform Pangu, who takes over his body and pits a mind controlled Lu Xin against Kai. Kai is able to snap him out of it and the two defeat Pangu, trapping a dispossessed William underground.

The group celebrates their victory with a day at the beach, but Kai tells them that he has to battle a necromancer next.

== Cast ==
- Iko Uwais as Kai Jin
- Lewis Tan as Lu Xin Lee
- Lawrence Kao as Tommy Wah
- Pearl Thusi as Zama Zulu
- Rhatha Phongam as Ku An Qi "Queen of Bangkok Underworld"
- JuJu Chan as Zan Hui
- Francesca Corney as Preeya
- Jason Tobin as William Pan
- Simon Kuke
- Katrina Grey as Interpol Agent

== Production ==
On February 26, 2021, Netflix ordered a 90-minute film project titled Fistful of Vengeance, acting as a follow-up to the first season of Wu Assassins. Living Films was involved in the production of the film, after serving in the series. Roel Reiné directed the film, whilst Cameron Litvack, Jessica Chou and Yalun Tu helmed the screenplay. After the film announcement, it was confirmed that Iko Uwais, Lewis Tan, Lawrence Kao and JuJu Chan will reprise their respective roles from the series in Wu Assassins: Fistful of Vengeance. Additionally, it was confirmed that Pearl Thusi, Francesca Corney, Jason Tobin, Rhatha Phongam and Simon Kuke were cast in the film. Filming took place in Thailand in early 2021.

Speaking on the film's connection to the original series, Kao states:

[It] is sort of like a standalone movie. You don't necessarily have to watch the first season to understand what's going on, I personally think it's something that'll be more easily digestible, but also more action-packed and a roller coaster from beginning to end.

== Release ==
The film was released on February 17, 2022, on the streaming service Netflix.

== Reception ==
On the review aggregator website Rotten Tomatoes, 45% of 20 critics' reviews are positive. Metacritic, which uses a weighted average, assigned the film a score of 44 out of 100, based on six critics, indicating "mixed or average" reviews.
