= Ludi Lin =

Chinese-Canadian actor and model

- 林路迪
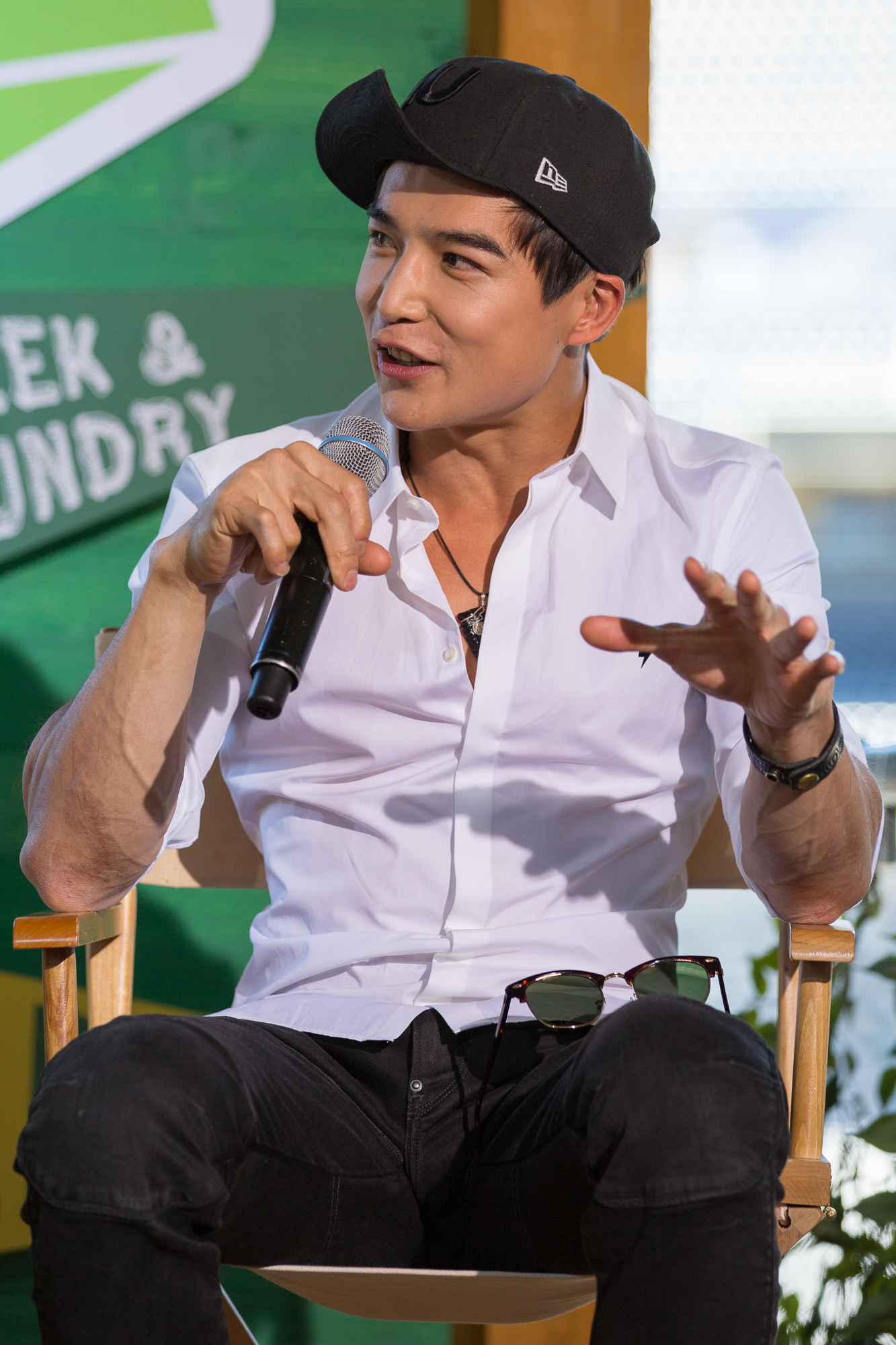
- Lin in July 2016
- Born: November 11, 1987 (age 38); Fuzhou, China
- Citizenship: Canada; Hong Kong
- Occupations: Actor, model

Chinese name
- Chinese: 林路迪
Transcriptions
Standard Mandarin
- Hanyu Pinyin: Lín Lùdí

Ludi Lin (Chinese: 林路迪; pinyin: Lín Lùdí) is a Hong Kong-Canadian actor and model. He is known for playing Zack Taylor in the 2017 Power Rangers reboot, the underwater warrior Murk in Aquaman (2018), and Liu Kang in the 2021 Mortal Kombat reboot and the 2026 sequel.

== Early life ==
Lin was born in Fuzhou, China, and moved to Hong Kong at age 3.

Lin was sent abroad to boarding schools at age 9 in Sydney, Australia where he spent the bulk of his youth. His accent was different each time he moved, but he was considered as an outsider in Australia. "I had to fight a lot as a kid," Lin said, referring to how he learned street fighting just to defend his different accents. At age 17, he immigrated to Vancouver, Canada for university. He attended and graduated from the University of British Columbia with a double major in Dietetics and Theatre Performance. Lin also studied film and TV acting in Los Angeles. Lin currently resides in Vancouver and Beijing.

== Career ==
Lin started his acting career with short films and later landed his first major U.S. role in the movie, Power Rangers.

He had previously auditioned for Shang-Chi for the Marvel Cinematic Universe movie, Shang-Chi and the Legend of the Ten Rings (2021) and also for Spike Spiegel from the live-action Cowboy Bebop. He is also mentioned that he is a fan of the anime the series was based on.

== Personal life ==
Lin is highly athletic, having trained in snowboarding, scuba diving, martial arts, muay thai, jiu-Jitsu and Olympic-style wrestling.

He is fluent in English, Mandarin, and Cantonese.

He became a vegan around 2016. In a video where he explains his dietary fundamentals on the Men's Health YouTube channel, Lin advocates a vegan diet saying "It's good for the Earth, it's good for my body, I feel good about it because animals are cute, and it is the only thing that is sustainable."

Lin is also a fan of comic books, manga, and anime. He is also an activist for Asian representation and speaking out against Asian racism with movements like Stop Asian Hate.

== Filmography ==
=== Film ===
Year	Title	Role	Notes
2011	The Intruders	Grant	Short Film
2012	The Shannon Entropy	Holt	Short Film
2012	Loners	Loner	Short Film
2012	Stasis	Jake	Short Film
2014	Monster Hunt	Wind Monster Hunter	
2017	Power Rangers	Zack Taylor / Black Ranger	
2018	Aquaman	Murk	
2019	In a New York Minute	David Qiao	
2020	Son of the South	Derek Ang	
2021	Mortal Kombat	Liu Kang	
2026	Mortal Kombat II	Liu Kang	

=== Television ===
Year	Title	Role	Notes
2012	Holiday Spin	Clayton	TV movie
2014	Marco Polo	Batbayer	1 Episode
2019	Black Mirror	Lance	Episode: "Striking Vipers"
2020	The Ghost Bride	Lim Tian Bai	6 episodes
2021	Aquaman: King of Atlantis	Murk	Voice, 1 episode
2021	Humans	Wen Hao Kang	3 episodes
2021–2022	Kung Fu	Kerwin Tan	Recurring role (seasons 1-2)
