= Celia Au =

American actress (active 2007–present)

- Born: Hong Kong
- Occupations: Actress; filmmaker
- Years active: 2007–present

Celia Au is an Hong Kong born-American actress and filmmaker based in Chinatown, Manhattan. Born in Hong Kong and raised in Brooklyn, New York, she has appeared in the television series Lodge 49 (2018–2019) and Wu Assassins (2019).

== Filmography ==
=== Film ===
Year	Title	Role	Notes
2008	Heaven's Messenger	Hallway Orderly	
2009	Chasing the Green	A & R Employee	
2010	Beware the Gonzo	Gender Bender #2	
2010	God's Land	Woman in Church	
2011	Detachment	Ellen	as Sze Ming Au
2011	5000 Friends		short film
2011	We Are the Hartmans	Baxter Fan	
2012	Bad Tara	Bad Tara	
2012	Sonic	Jade	short film
2013	Video Game	Sagani	short film
2013	The Unity of All Things		
2013	Chinese Puzzle	Une skater	
2014	Grind	Photographer	short film
2014	Revenge of the Green Dragons	Bobo	
2015	People Places Things	Celia	
2015	Demolition	Punk Girl	
2015	Sphere		short film
2016	White Girl	Partygoer #1	as Szeming Celia Au
2016	AWOL	College Girl #4	
2016	Eugenia and John	Korean Student	
2016	The Last Tip	Ming	short film
2016	Once in a Lifetime	Nightmare	TV movie
2016	Daykwon	Erin	short film
2017	Where Is Kyra?	Eve	
2017	Well, Bitch	Samantha #1	short film
2017	High School Noir	Melanie Pate	TV movie
2017	Extraction (Virtual Reality)	Ester	short film
2018	Paterno	Cathy, Newhouse's secretary.	
2018	Tomato & Eggs	Lisa	short film
2018	Black Dragon	Chau	short film
2019	In a New York Minute	Nina Wong	
2020	Once Upon a Time in the Bamboo	Female Warrior Feng	short film
2021	The Complaint	Student	short film
2021	Shoplifters of the World	Siouxsie Chu	
2021	Snakehead	Jai	
2021	Made in Chinatown	Suzie Wong	
2021	Sub-Zero vs Scorpion	Narrator	Short film
2021	Mama, Sik Fan	Mama	Short film
2022	She Said	Hong Kong Waitress	
2023	Dirty Rotten Tofu and the Gohan Girls	Sushi	Short film
2023	Astonishing Little Feet	Afong Moy	Short film
2023	Doors We Open	Lia	
2023	Asian Persuasion	Lisa	
2024	Hold	Kiara	Short film
2025	Last Call	Claudia	Short film
2025	A Beauty Supply in Queens		Short film

=== Television series ===
Year	Title	Role	Notes
2011	Jon Benjamin Has a Van	Kid	Episode: "Breakdown Van"
2014-2015	Gotham	Zsasz Henchwoman #2	Recurring; 3 episodes.
2016	Vinyl	May Pang	Episode: " E.A.B."
2017	Iron Fist	Mary	Episode: "Lead Horse Back to Stable"
2017	Madam Secretary	Translator	Episode: "Good Bones"
2018	Lodge 49	Alice Ba	Recurring; 12 episodes.
2019	Wu Assassins	Ying Ying	Main role; 7 episodes.
2020; 2023	Awkwafina Is Nora from Queens	Grace	2 episodes
2021	High Herstory	Hua Mulan	Episode: "Hua Mulan"
2022	The Equalizer	Chloe San	Episode: "Chinatown"
2025	S.W.A.T.	Tia	Episode: "High Ground"
