= Skeletons in the Closet (film) =

2024 horror film

- Theatrical release poster
- Directed by: Asif Akbar
- Written by: Koji Steven Sakai; Joshua A. Cohen
- Story by: Al Bravo
- Produced by: Al Bravo; Eduard Osipov; Joshua A. Cohen; Asif Akbar; Koji Steven Sakai; Colin Bates; Stan Erdreich; Monica R. Cooper; Hemdee Kiwanuka
- Starring: Terrence Howard; Cuba Gooding Jr.
- Production companies: Al Bravo Films; Beno Films; One Dollar Studios
- Distributed by: Allblk
- Release dates: January 24, 2024 (Philippines); February 9, 2024 (United States)
- Running time: 92 minutes
- Country: United States
- Language: English
- Box office: $1,420

Skeletons in the Closet is a 2024 American horror film directed by Asif Akbar and starring Terrence Howard and Cuba Gooding Jr. It was Sally Kirkland's final film role before her death in 2025.

== Plot ==
Haunted by a malevolent spirit since childhood, a desperate mother allows herself to become possessed in order to save the life of her terminally ill daughter.

== Cast ==
- Terrence Howard as Mark
- Cuba Gooding Jr. as Andres
- Clifton Powell as Father Francisco
- Valery M. Ortiz as Valentina
- Udo Kier as Luc
- Sally Kirkland as Madam Futura
- Louis Mandylor as Santeros

== Production ==
Lance Kawas was initially to have helmed the film; he left the project due to creative differences and was replaced by Asif Akbar. Filming began in Las Vegas in February 2022.

On March 25, 2022, it was announced that filming had wrapped.

== Release ==
Skeletons in the Closet was released in the Philippines on January 24, 2024 and in the United States on February 9, 2024.
