= Asian Persuasion =

- Directed by: Jhett Tolentino
- Written by: Mike Ang
- Starring: Dante Basco; KC Concepcion; Kevin Kreider; Paolo Montalban
- Release date: March 21, 2025 (United States)
- Running time: 93 minutes
- Countries: United States; Philippines
- Language: English

Asian Persuasion is a 2025 romantic comedy drama film written by Mike Ang, directed by Jhett Tolentino and starring Dante Basco, KC Concepcion, Kevin Kreider and Paolo Montalban.

== Plot ==
Asian Persuasion is the outlandish story of a down-on-his-luck chef, Mickey de Los Santos, who cooks up a crazy scheme to marry off his ex-wife, Avery Chua, by setting her up with a fake internet dating profile in an attempt to find her a suitor to re-marry in order to avoid his substantial alimony obligations. With the help of his trusted wingman, Mickey gets off to a hot start - until he realizes he wants a second chance with Avery. He might be too late.

== Cast ==
- Dante Basco as Mickey de los Santos
- KC Concepcion as Avery Chua
- Kevin Kreider as Caspian Jang
- Paolo Montalban as Lee-Kwan Prince
- Geneva Carr as Helene Dubois
- Scarlet Sher as Sam
- Celia Au as Lisa
- Jax Bacani as Jovi Pineda

== Production ==
In April 2022, it was announced that production on the film was underway.

The film was entirely shot in New York, including Manhattan, Brooklyn, Queens, and Westchester County.

The film features a primarily Asian cast, with a cast and crew from 26 Asian nations.

== Release ==
In October 2024, it was announced that Scatena & Rosner Films acquired worldwide rights to the film, which was released in theaters on March 21, 2025 and on VOD and digital platforms on May 27, 2025.

In the United States, the film was shown at AMC Theaters, Regal Cinemas, Consolidated Theatres, Laemmle NoHo, Village East by Angelika, Violet Crown Cinema, and Maya Cinemas. The theatrical release spanned several markets - Atlanta, Charlotte, Chicago, Dallas, Detroit, Houston, Minneapolis, Las Vegas, Los Angeles, Phoenix, Tampa, Washington, D.C., Seattle, San Francisco, and Honolulu.

The film was also released on a nationwide Philippine theatrical run in November 2023 and was shown in major theaters in Metro Manila, Ilo Ilo, Cebu, Pampanga, and Bacolod.

The film also was available to watch on Emirates Airlines and Philippine Airlines.

In May 2025, Center Stage Records released two soundtrack albums for the movie. The score album features the film’s original music composed by Eunike Tanzil and is available to stream/download on all major digital music services, including Amazon. The other album features the songs from the movie by artists such as Happy Singh, MIYACHI, RADHA, SaB, Calistar & others.

== Reception ==
The film won the Audience Award at the 2023 SoHo Film Festival.

The film also screened at the 2023 Richmond International Film Festival and was the closing night film at the 2023 San Diego Filipino Film Festival. It was also screened at the inaugural 2026 Arté Film Festival in Livermore, CA.

The film was selected for a special screening at the Smithsonian National Asian Art Museum on April 4, 2025.

The film has a 97% rating on Rotten Tomatoes.

Phil Hoad of The Guardian awarded the film two stars out of five.

Bradley Gibson of Film Threat scored the film a 7 out of 10, saying “probably should have been more a little bit more subtle… But cute? Yes, ridiculously cute.”
