= Mue Nuer Mek =

Thai action drama television series

- Also known as: The Last Legend
- Genre: Action; Martial arts Crime Drama; Romance; Heroic bloodshed
- Based on: Mue Nuer Mek by Orachon
- Written by: Ping Lumpraploeng
- Directed by: Oliver Bever
- Starring: Chanapol Sataya; Rapeepat Ekpankul; Thun Thanakorn
- Opening theme: "Love on Enrage" (ยิ่งรักยิ่งแค้น) performed by Thai Thanawut
- Ending theme: "Stop Loving" (หยุดรัก) performed by Siriporn Aroonboonsawads
- Composers: The Stings; Thai Thanawut
- Country of origin: Thailand
- Original language: Thai
- No. of episodes: 16

Production
- Executive producer: Reviewing Committee of Television Drama, Channel 7
- Producers: Pichet Sriracha; Oliver Bever
- Production locations: Bangkok, Than Thip Waterfall & Takhro Waterfall in Prachin Buri, Khaolon Adventure in Nakhon Nayok, Phu Khae Botanical Garden in Sara Buri, Chaloem Rattanakosin National Park (Tham Than Lot Noi) in Kanchanaburi, The Thai Red Cross Society in Samut Prakan
- Running time: 130 minutes (per episode); Wednesdays & Thursdays at 20:20 (ICT)
- Production companies: Nine Bever Films Co., Ltd.

Original release
- Network: Channel 7
- Release: June 7 – July 27, 2017

Related
- Sen Tang Ban Terng; Chid Jor Ror Doo

The Last Legends also known as Mue Nuer Mek (Thai: มือเหนือเมฆ; RTGS: Mue Nuea Mek; lit: Hand Above the Cloud; International title: The Last Legend) was a Thai action/drama series or lakorn in heroic bloodshed style, like the 1997 film Dang Bireley's and Young Gangsters. It's a remake of a 1984 namesake film (lead role by Sorapong Chatree and directed by Bhandit Rittakol). Unlike most Thai dramas, it features a cast that includes many stunt performers in acting roles. Aired on Channel 7 in mid-2017 after the end of Phring, Khon Rerng Muang.

== Plot summary ==
Set in 1950s Bangkok, this is the story of three childhood friends who once roamed the streets together as technical school boys. As they come of age, each is drawn into a different mafia syndicate, rising through the ranks amid the smoky teahouses, gambling dens, and back-alley politics of a city in flux. Loyalties are tested. Power is seductive. And in the end, brotherhood may not survive the war for the underworld.

== Cast ==
Main characters

- Chanapol Sataya as Jom
- Rapeepat Ekpankul as Chead
- Thun Thanakorn as Bovorn
- Kavita Chindawath as Boonta
- Nattasha Nauljam as Pornpan
- Parnthorthong Boonthong as Jampa

Supporting characters

Gang members of Jao Sua Kim

- Satawat Donlayavijit as Jao Sua Kim or Sua Kim (Mogul Kim)
- AIZEN as Tong
- Ganitharin Prachrapakdeechode as Sichon

Gang members of Nai Hua Buan

- Surawoot Maikan as Nai Hua Buan (Boss Buan)
- Puchong Sartnok as Tia
- Winai Wiangyangkung as Nat

Gang members of Sia Heng

- Chalermporn Pumpanwong as Sia Heng (Mogul Heng)
- Charlie Ruedpokanon as Toey
- Somjai Janmoontree as Ah Jai
- Than Wong as Pom

Police officers of Sarawat Asawin

- Oliver Bever as Sarawat Asawin (Inspector Asawin)
- Rattawit Sahaya as Ja Joi (Sergeant Joi)
- Luis Chernyim as Ja Chum (Sergeant Chum)

Other characters

- Samart Payakaroon as Lung Ban (Uncle Ban)
- Supakorn Kitsuwon as Yai
- Kasab Champadib as Woeng Nakhon Kasem
- Suthita Ketanont as Jaem
- Pichet Sriracha as Joem
- Vanessa Bever as Pi Ganda (Sister Ganda)
- Puang Chernyim as Luang Pi (Venerable Brother)
- Rattasin Nalintanapat as Sutham
- Simon Kuke as Nan Kam
- John Bravo as Tua Ngok

Guest appearances

- Patson Sarindu as Phu Kan Kamron (Commander Kamron)
- Weerachai Hattagowit as Ja Prateep (Sergeant Prateep)
- Wacharachai Sunthornsiri as Khun Pan

== Reception and ratings ==
When it aired, it was ranked 8th for the first episode of the series on Channel 7 in 2017. The ratings aren't high, however, it's considered to be the highest rated series to be released during that same time. But in the last two episodes, it got a higher rating than The Mask Singer (season 2), a highly rated singing competition program on Workpoint TV.

In the tables below, the blue numbers represent the highest ratings and the red numbers represent the lowest ratings.

Episode	Broadcast Date	Ratings
Episode	Broadcast Date	Nationwide
1	June 7, 2017	4.6%
2	June 8, 2017	4.8%
3	June 14, 2017	4.1%
4	June 15, 2017	4.2%
5	June 21, 2017	5.1%
6	June 22, 2017	5.4%
7	June 28, 2017	5.2%
8	June 29, 2017	5.4%
9	July 5, 2017	5.4%
10	July 6, 2017	5.5%
11	July 12, 2017	5.7%
12	July 13, 2017	5.9%
13	July 19, 2017	6.0%
14	July 20, 2017	5.8%
15	July 26, 2017	5.2%
16	July 27, 2017	7.1%
Average		5.34%

== Awards ==
Year	Award	Category	Recipient	Result
2017	3rd Maya Awards	Popular Director in a TV Series	Oliver Bever	Won
2017	5th Phra Phikanet Awards	Best Director in an Action TV Series	Oliver Bever	Won
2017	5th Phra Phikanet Awards	Best Effect	Mark Effect	Won
