= Katheryn Winnick =

Canadian actress (born 1977)

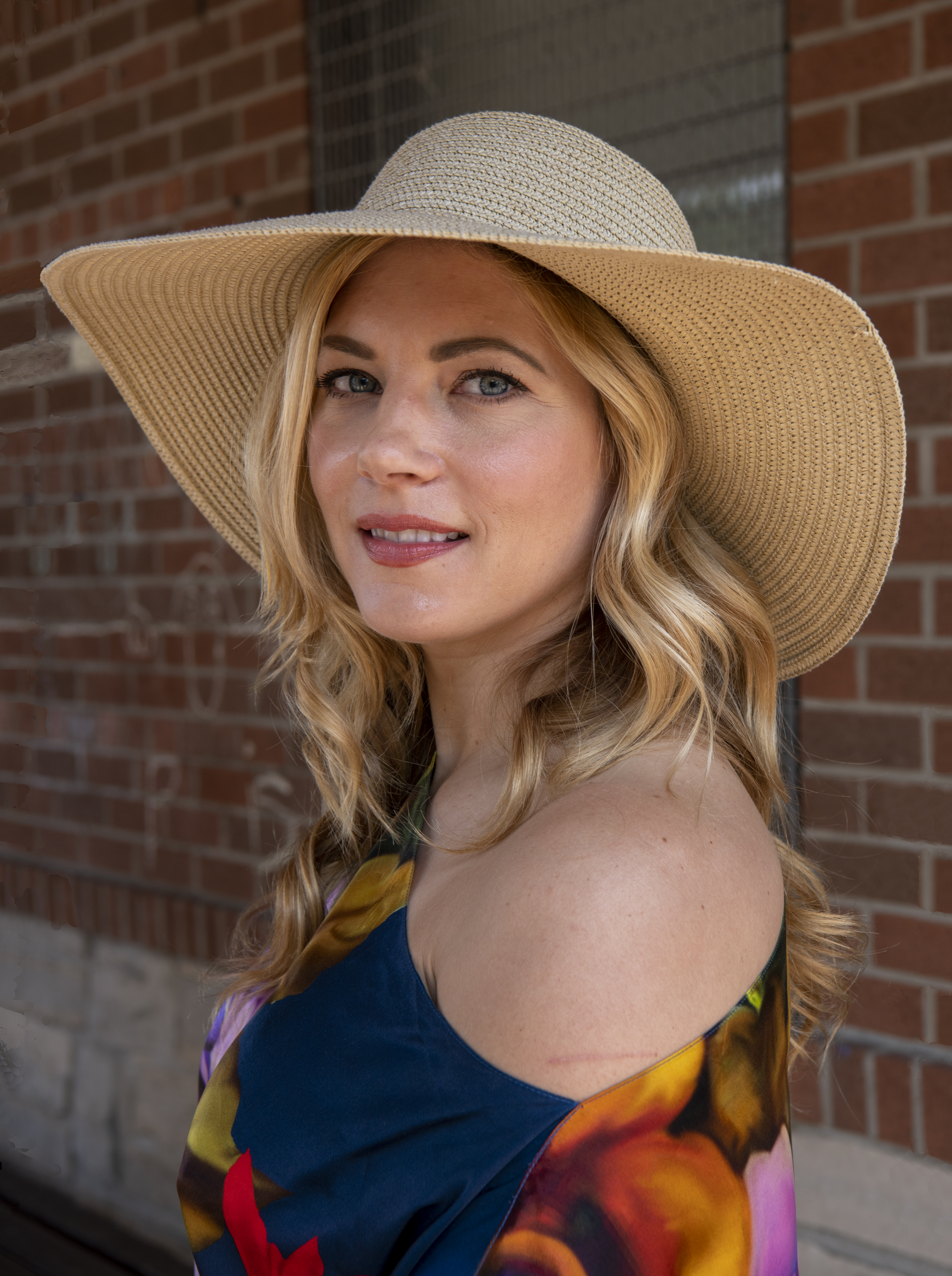
- Winnick in 2023
- Born: December 17, 1977 (age 48); Toronto, Ontario, Canada
- Citizenship: Canada; United States
- Education: York University
- Occupation: Actress
- Years active: 1999–present

Katheryn Winnick (born December 17, 1977) is a Canadian actress. She is known for her starring roles in the television series Vikings (2013–2020), Wu Assassins (2019), and Big Sky (2020–2023), and her recurring role on the television series Bones (2010–2011). She also starred in the films Amusement (2008), Choose (2010), A Glimpse Inside the Mind of Charles Swan III (2012), The Art of the Steal (2013), Polar (2019), and The Marksman (2021).

== Early life and education ==
Katheryn Winnick was born on December 17, 1977, in Toronto, and is of Ukrainian descent. She spoke Ukrainian as her first language and did not begin speaking English until she was eight years old. She has two brothers.

She began training in martial arts at age seven, and obtained her first black belt at 13. By age 21, she had started three Taekwondo schools. She taught Taekwondo and self-defense to actors while completing her degree in kinesiology at York University, Toronto. Winnick studied at and is an alumnus of the William Esper Studio.

Winnick started acting as a young girl at her community centre in Toronto. She had directed plays in her high school and won a scholarship for drama and directing while attending Richview Collegiate Institute.

== Career ==
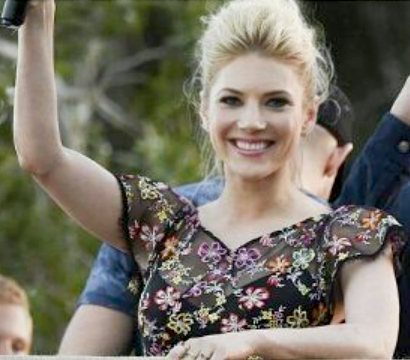
Winnick in 2017

Winnick entered the film industry by teaching martial arts to actors on movie sets; the experience inspired her to pursue professional acting. She was then cast as a series regular on Student Bodies.

Since then, she has appeared in many films, including Stand Up Guys, Failure to Launch, Love & Other Drugs, and Killers. She has guest-starred in numerous television shows, most notably House, The Glades, Bones, Law & Order, Law & Order: Criminal Intent, CSI, CSI: NY, CSI: Miami, Criminal Minds, Person of Interest, and Nikita. In 2010, she joined the cast of Bones, in the recurring role of Hannah Burley, a glamorous war correspondent and love interest for main character Seeley Booth.

Winnick starred in the comedy-drama film Cold Souls, which had its world premiere at the Sundance Film Festival 2009. In 2011, she was cast in a guest role on The CW's spy drama Nikita. In 2013, she starred in A Glimpse Inside the Mind of Charles Swan III and appeared in the comedy The Art of the Steal. She also joined History Channel's Vikings, starring as Lagertha, a legendary figure in Viking history. In July 2017, Winnick stated on her Twitter account that she had been cast for a role in what was thought to be a film project, and that it would be announced at San Diego Comic-Con. She was later revealed to be cast as a main character in the Nazi Zombies mode of the video game Call of Duty: WWII.

In July 2018, it was announced that Winnick had been cast in the series regular role of Christine "C.G." Gavin on the Netflix series, Wu Assassins. In February 2020, Winnick was announced to play the starring role of Jenny Hoyt on the ABC crime drama series Big Sky.

== Personal life ==
In 2015, Winnick said she has dual American and Canadian citizenship. Her brothers have made appearances on Vikings.

In March 2022, Winnick, together with her mother, created the charity "The Winnick Foundation" to raise funds for the needs of Ukraine during the Russian invasion of Ukraine. In November 2022, the Russian Ministry of Foreign Affairs banned Winnick from entering Russia, along with 99 other Canadians, in response to international sanctions.

== Filmography ==
Key
†	Denotes films that have not yet been released

=== Film ===
Year	Title	Role	Notes
2001	Biohazardous	Jennifer	
2002	Smoking Herb	Marcia	
2002	The It Factor	Herself	
2002	Fabled	Liz	
2002	Two Weeks Notice	Tiffany	
2003	What Alice Found	Julie	
2004	50 First Dates	Young Woman	
2004	Satan's Little Helper	Jenna Whooly	
2004	Going the Distance	Trish	
2004	Our Time Is Up	Waif	Short film
2005	Hellraiser: Hellworld	Chelsea	
2006	Cloud 9	Olga	
2006	Kiss Me Again	Chalice	
2006	Failure to Launch	Melissa	
2007	When Nietzsche Wept	Lou Salome	
2008	Amusement	Tabitha "Tabby" Wright	
2009	Cold Souls	Sveta	
2010	Tranced	Cleo	
2010	Radio Free Albemuth	Rachel Brady	
2010	Choose	Fiona Wagner	
2010	Killers	Vivian	
2010	Love & Other Drugs	Lisa	
2011	Bat $#*! Crazy	Girlfriend	
2012	Stand Up Guys	Oxana	
2012	A Glimpse Inside the Mind of Charles Swan III.	Ivana	
2013	The Art of the Steal	Lola	
2016	Stripped	Margaret Dupre	Short film
2017	The Dark Tower	Laurie Chambers	
2018	Speed Kills	Emily Gowen	
2019	Polar	Vivian	
2020	Wander	Elsa Viceroy	
2021	The Marksman	Sarah Pennington	
2021	Flag Day	Patty Vogel	Also co-producer
TBA	My New Friend Jim †	Melissa Cory	Post-production
TBA	The Last Cargo †	Florence	Post-production
TBA	Compound 9 †	Riley	Post-production

=== Television ===
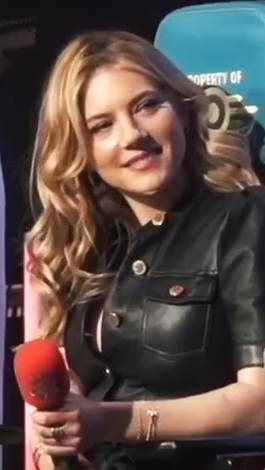
Katheryn Winnick promoting Vikings at the German Comic Con 2022

Year	Title	Role	Notes
1999	PSI Factor: Chronicles of the Paranormal	Suzie	Episode: "Sacrifices"
1999	Student Bodies	Holly Benson	Recurring role, 5 episodes
2000	Relic Hunter	Roselyn	Episode: "Nine Lives"
2001	Screech Owls	Brianna Styles	Episode: "Face Off"
2002	Tracker	Laura	2 episodes
2002	Law & Order: Criminal Intent	Karyn Bennett	Episode: "Seizure"
2003	Oz	Liesel Robson	Episode: "4giveness"
2003	Wild Card	Kendall	Episode: "Hell Week"
2003	10-8: Officers on Duty	Lucy Johnson	Episode: "Lucy in the Sky"
2004	CSI: Miami	Nicole Harjo	Episode: "Rap Sheet"
2004	1-800-Missing	Julie Snyder	Episode: "In the Midnight Hour"
2005	CSI: NY	Lisa Kay	Episode: "Corporate Warriors"
2005	Trump Unauthorized	Ivana Trump	Television film
2006	Criminal Minds	Maggie Lowe	Episode: "Somebody’s Watching"
2006	13 Graves	Amy	Television film
2007	House	Eve	Episode: "One Day, One Room"
2007	Tipping Point	Nina Patterson	Television film
2007	Law Dogs	Lisa Bennett	Television film
2008	Law & Order	Sarah Shipley	Episode: "Excalibur"
2008	Law & Order: Criminal Intent	Carrie Conlon	Episode: "Faithfully"
2009	CSI: Crime Scene Investigation	Maureen Martin	Episode: "One to Go"
2010	The Gates	Kat Russo	Episode: "Identity Crisis"
2010–2011	Bones	Hannah Burley	Recurring role, 11 episodes
2011	The Glades	Valerie Dorman	Episode: "Lost and Found"
2011	Nikita	Kelly	Episode: "Partners"
2012	Transporter: The Series	Darcy Daniels	Episode: "Hot Ice"
2013–2020	Vikings	Lagertha	Main role
2015	Person of Interest	Frankie Wells	Episode: "Skip "
2019	Wu Assassins	Christine "C.G." Gavin	Main role and also co-executive producer
2020–2023	Big Sky	Jenny Hoyt	Main role
TBA	Murder In Cold Country †	Joanna Doyle	Television film

=== Video games ===
- Call of Duty: WWII (2017), as Marie Fischer

=== As a director ===
- Wu Assassins (2019), episode: "Legacy"
- Vikings (2020), episode: "Valhalla Can Wait"

== Awards and nominations ==
Year	Award	Category	Work	Result	Refs.
2012	Beverly Hills Film Festival	Best Actress	Children of the Air	Won	
2014	Canadian Screen Award	Best Performance by an Actress in a Continuing Leading Dramatic Role	Vikings	Nominated	
2014	Women's Image Network Awards	Best Actress in a Drama Series	Vikings	Nominated	
2015	Critics' Choice Television Award	Best Supporting Actress in a Drama Series	Vikings	Nominated	
2015	Golden Maple Awards	Best Actress in a TV series broadcast in the U.S.	Vikings	Nominated	
2015	Women's Image Network Awards	Best Actress in a Drama Series	Vikings	Nominated	
2016	Women's Image Network Awards	Best Actress in a Drama Series	Vikings	Nominated	
