= DragonBlade: The Legend of Lang =

2005 Hong Kong film by Antony Szeto

- Theatrical release poster
- Directed by: Antony Szeto
- Written by: Trevor Morris
- Produced by: Stanley Tong
- Starring: Karen Mok; Daniel Wu; Stephen Fung; Sandra Ng
- Edited by: Kwong Chi-Leung
- Music by: Lincoln Lo
- Production companies: DCDC; China Film
- Distributed by: ERA company; Kantana Animation
- Release date: 6 January 2005
- Running time: 85 minutes
- Country: Hong Kong
- Languages: Cantonese; English; Mandarin
- Budget: USD10 million
- Box office: $1,966,342

DragonBlade: The Legend of Lang (Chinese: 龍刀奇緣) is a 2005 Hong Kong 3D CGI animated adventure fantasy action comedy family martial arts film edited by Chi-Leung Kwong, written by Trevor Morris with music by Kin Law and produced by Stanley Tong. It is the first 3D-CGI Chinese animated feature film from Hong Kong and directed by Antony Szeto. It was co-produced by DCDC and China Film company, and is also considered the first 3D-rendered martial arts film. The film features the voices of Karen Mok, Daniel Wu, Stephen Fung and Sandra Ng. DragonBlade: The Legend of Lang was theatrically released on 6 January 2005 by ERA company and Kantana Animation and was released on DVD and VOD on 22 December 2005 by Era. The film earned $1,966,342 on a USD10 million budget. It received a Golden Horse Awards nomination for Best Animation Feature.

== Plot ==
A town is attacked by a deadly creature, it can only be stopped with the Dragon Blade. The one person who knows where the blade is won't tell Lang, and even if he did, untold peril will fall on anyone who dares to find this legendary weapon.

== Cast ==
Name	Voiced by
Hung Lang	Daniel Wu, Stephen Fung
ying ying	Karen Mok
Bali-Ba	Sandra Ng (Cantonese) / Ruby Lin (Mandarin version)
Master Wu	Jim Chim
Lord Ko	Doug Baker
Short Youngster	Sam Bobertz
Mr. Hung / Guardian Spirit	Stephen Bolton
Sifu	Simon Broad

== Production ==
The reigning all-China wushu champions gathered together in Shandong where the director and animators flew to learn more about the diversity of martial arts for the film. Although DragonBlade was completely made in Hong Kong, the film was originally animated and lip-synced to English first. This is because it is technically easier to dub from English to Cantonese than the other way around. The MTR transportation service promoted the movie with a Dragonblade octopus card. Since this movie is the first 3D-CG film fully rendered in Hong Kong, the card is now a rare collectible item. The idea of using "outtakes" (better known as "NG"s in Hong Kong) during the end credits was used by the director as a homage to Jackie Chan films. The film was filmed at Beijing, China, Hong Kong, China and Yun Cheng, Shandong, China in 2005. The film's music was composed by Kin Law.

== Release ==
DragonBlade: The Legend of Lang was theatrically released on 6 January 2005 by ERA company and Kantana Animation and was released on DVD and VOD on 22 December 2005 by Era.

== Awards and nominations ==
Australian Screen Directors' Association 2006

Award	Category	Nominee	Result
ASDA Award	Special Achievement in a First Feature Film and Best Direction of a First Feature Film	Antony Szeto	Won and Nominated

Golden Horse Film Festival 2005

Award	Category	Nominee	Result
Golden Horse Award	Best Animation Feature	Antony Szeto	Nominated

Hong Kong Digital Entertainment Excellence Awards 2004

Award	Category	Nominee
HKDEEA Award	Professional Category - Best Computer Animation - Feature Film	Won

== See also ==
- List of animated feature-length films
- List of computer-animated films
