= Lawrence Kao =

American actor

- Born: Lawrence Kao; Hacienda Heights, California, U.S.
- Education: University of California, Irvine (BA)
- Occupations: Actor, dancer
- Years active: 2009–present
- Website: https://www.iamlawrencekao.com/

Lawrence Kao is an American actor, best known for his roles as Tommy Wah in the Netflix series Wu Assassins, Donnie Lu in the Fox series Sleepy Hollow, Van in the CW series The Originals and Tim in the AMC series, The Walking Dead.

== Early life ==
Kao was born and raised in Hacienda Heights, California, where he later graduated from Glen A. Wilson High School. He played Lysander in his high school's production of A Midsummer Night's Dream. However, during one of the in-class previews of the show, Kao was falsely arrested for attempted murder and assault with a deadly weapon. If convicted, the minimum sentencing would have been 40 years behind bars. Kao was later released in the absence and lack of probable cause, giving him enough time to make it before the closing night of the show. After being forced to contemplate his life inside jail, Kao realized he wanted to pursue acting as a profession.

Kao received his B.A. in theater from the University of California, Irvine (UCI), where he was a part of Kaba Modern dance team. Within the dancing community on campus, he befriended the Kinjaz dance team cofounders Mike Song and Anthony Lee.

== Career ==
=== Acting ===
He pursued a full-time career as an actor. Starting out, he found that including his dancing credentials on his resume would always elicit a dance request at auditions, so he removed it after several incidents.

In 2012, Kao made his television acting debut in the AMC post-apocalyptic horror series The Walking Dead. Following on from his first role, Kao won other roles on a variety of TV shows and films including Hawaii Five-0, Sleepy Hollow, Girlboss, Lucky Fifty, Silver Lake, NCIS: Los Angeles and The Purge.

On October 17, 2018, it was announced that Kao had been cast in the series regular role of Tommy Wah on the Netflix crime drama series Wu Assassins. Kao reprised his role in the sequel film Fistful of Vengeance. It was released on February 17, 2022.

=== Dance ===
After graduating from UCI, Kao continued working as a dancer, and later competed in the first season of MTV's America's Best Dance Crew with his college dance team, Kaba Modern.

As of June 2019, Kao is dancing with the Kinjaz dance team.

== Filmography ==
=== Film ===
Year	Title	Role	Notes
2015	Circle	Asian Kid	
2017	I Hate You	Chi	
2018	Silver Lake	Eric	
2019	Lucky Fifty	Jay	
2022	Fistful of Vengeance	Tommy Wah	

=== Television ===
Year	Title	Role	Notes
2012	The Walking Dead	Tim	3 episodes
2013	Hawaii Five-0	Ty Amano	Episode: "A ia la aku"
2014	NCIS: Los Angeles	John Stikler	Episode: "One More Chance"
2015–2016	The Originals	Van	5 episodes
2017	Sleepy Hollow	Donnie Lu	2 episodes
2017	Girlboss	Sonny	Episode: "Motherf*ckin' Bar Graphs"
2019	The Purge	Andy Tran	2 episodes
2019	Wu Assassins	Tommy Wah	Main cast
2021	Leverage: Redemption	Joseph Cheng	Episode: "The Double-Edged Sword Job"
2022–2023	Walker: Independence	Kai	Main role
2024	Law & Order	Chris Wu	Episode: "Inconvenient Truth"
2026	Avatar: The Last Airbender	Avatar Roku	Episode: "Something Broken"
