= The Great Escape (2023 film) =

Indo-American action film

- Directed by: Sandeep J.L.
- Written by: Yadhu Krishnan
- Starring: Babu Antony; Sandeep JL; Arthur Babu Antony; Simon Kuke; Sampath Ram; Chaz Taylor
- Cinematography: Ken Dinh
- Edited by: Jayakrishna
- Music by: Kaizad Patel; Firoze Patel
- Release date: May 26, 2023
- Countries: India; United States
- Languages: English; Malayalam

The Great Escape is a 2023 Indo-American action film directed by Sandeep JL and written by Yadhu Krishnan. It stars Babu Antony, Arthur Babu Antony, Sandeep J.L., Simon Kuke, and Chaz Taylor, as well as featuring Sampath Ram in a guest appearance. The Great Escape was released on May 26, 2023.

== Synopsis ==
Three Indian illegal immigrants in the United States get stuck between two criminal gangs.

== Cast ==
- Babu Antony as Bob Christo
- Sandeep JL as Sandy
- Simon Kuke
- Caren Damer as Caren
- Arthur Babu Antony as Arthur
- Natalie Mull as Natalie
- Sampath Ram as Don Carlos
- Chaz Taylor as Lord Pavlov
- Cindy Teniente as Jessica
- Josekutty Valiyakallumkal as Matthew
- Robert Mahaffey as the Butler
