= In a New York Minute (film) =

- Directed by: Xi Liman
- Written by: Xi Liman
- Starring: Amy Chang; Yi Liu; Celia Au
- Release date: April 28, 2019 (Newport Beach)
- Running time: 102 minutes
- Country: United States
- Languages: English; Chinese

In a New York Minute is a 2019 American drama film written and directed by Li Ximan and starring Amy Chang, Yi Liu and Celia Au.

== Cast ==
- Amy Chang as Amy Chen
- Jae Shin as Peter Chow
- Celia Au as Nina Wong
- Yi Liu as Angel Li
- Ludi Lin as David Qiao
- Mark Delabarre as Robert Sherman
- Erik Lochtefeld as Howard
- Roger Yeh as Ian Tam
- Cheng Pei-pei as Amy’s mother

== Release ==
The film premiered at the Newport Beach Film Festival on April 28, 2019. Then it was released on digital platforms on May 3, 2022.

== Reception ==
The film has a 67% rating on Rotten Tomatoes based on six reviews. Josh Bell of Crooked Marquee graded the film a B−. Bob Bloom of the Journal & Courier awarded the film two stars out of four. Alan Ng of Film Threat awarded the film eight stars out of ten.

Evan Dossey of the Midwest Film Journal gave the film a positive review, describing the film as “little long in the tooth, but it has a lot to say and ambition to spare.”
