= Zhou Cheng =

Publication information
- Publisher: Marvel Comics
- First appearance: The Immortal Iron Fist #17 (September 2008)
- Created by: Duane Swierczynski; Travel Foreman

In-story information
- Species: Human mutate
- Abilities: Parabolic hearing

Zhou Cheng is a fictional character appearing in American comic books published by Marvel Comics.

Lewis Tan portrayed the character in an episode of the first season of the Netflix Marvel Cinematic Universe television series Iron Fist.

== Publication history ==
Zhou Cheng first appears in The Immortal Iron Fist #17 and was created by Duane Swierczynski and Travel Foreman.

== Fictional character biography ==
Zhou Cheng has been killing previous Iron Fists for seventy-five years. He was under the mind control of Ch'i-Lin and attempted to capture and kill Danny Rand's ancestor Orson Randall and steal his heart. His reason for this was so that he can gain access to the Dragon's egg for his master to consume it. He attacks Danny on his thirty-third birthday, but is stopped by the combined effort of Luke Cage, Misty Knight and Colleen Wing. He then attacked the Thunder Dojo to lure Danny out, but Danny brought the Immortal Weapons to aid him. Zhou was able to sense Danny's chi, but was unable to detect the Immortal Weapons which foiled his plans.

It is later revealed that he had been secretly taking over Rand Corp. alongside Danny's secretary Nadine, who was also Zhou's girlfriend. They attempted to poison Danny through his tea, but he was rescued once again by Cage and Knight. Zhou disregards Nadine after she reveals that she is pregnant and proceeds to fight Danny to the death. Danny defeats and kills Zhou when he decides to not use his chi, Zhou was only able to defeat Danny by sensing his chi energy and anticipating his move set.

== In other media ==
Zhou Cheng appears in Iron Fist, portrayed by Lewis Tan. This version is "the sworn defender of the Hand" under Wilson Fisk's former ally Madame Gao, guarding one of her facilities in China. Rather than being possessed by Ch'i-Lin, he was trained separately by him and taught to consume large amounts of alcohol to "tame [his] inner dragon". As a result, he fights using a drunken fist style which proves to be effective against Danny Rand.
