= Koji Steven Sakai =

American screenwriter and producer

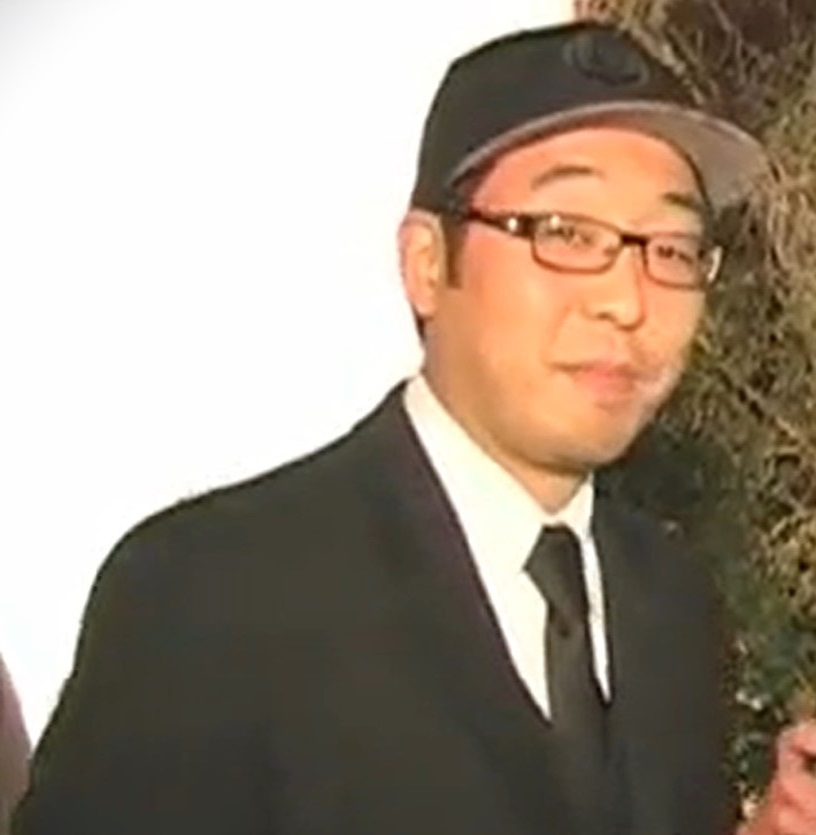
Sakai in 2010

Koji Steven Sakai is an American screenwriter and producer. He has written the screenplay for The People I've Slept With (2009), a romantic comedy film directed by Quentin Lee and starring Karin Anna Cheung and Archie Kao as well as Wilson Cruz, Lynn Chen, Randall Park, James Shigeta and more. He also served as a producer for that film. In addition, Sakai, along with Naoko Ihara Witmer, has co-written the screenplay for a horror film entitled The Haunted Highway (2006) which was directed by Junichi Suzuki; it was distributed by Lions Gate DVD in 2005. In 2013, he wrote and produced the "first Asian American serial killer film" entitled Chink, starring Jason Tobin, Eugenia Yuan, Tzi Ma and more, which was directed by Stanley Yung and produced by Quentin Lee. For Chink, lead actor Jason Tobin won a Special Jury Prize for Best Actor or "Breakout Performance" at the 2013 Los Angeles Asian Pacific Film Festival.

In June 2012, Sakai's screenplay Romeo, Juliet & Rosaline was selected by Amazon Studios for its Movie Development Slate. The comedy script is co-written with Emily Brauer Rogers and focuses on Rosaline, Romeo’s original crush. Monster & Me was released in November 2012.

Sakai wrote and produced the feature film The Commando, starring Michael Jai White and Oscar nominee Mickey Rourke and directed by Asif Akbar. The Commando was released by Paramount Pictures in January 2022.

Sakai's feature film Skeletons in the Closet recently completed production in Las Vegas. It was directed by Lance Kawas and Asif Akbar and stars Oscar nominee Terrence Howard (Hustle & Flow, Empire), Oscar winner Cuba Gooding Jr (Jerry Maguire), Clifton Powell (Ray), and Valery M. Ortiz (2 Minutes of Fame). Sakai was credited as a writer and producer on this project.

In addition, shooting for Sakai's latest indie thriller film Boneyard commenced in early 2023 in Las Vegas. The project stars Mel Gibson and Curtis "50 Cent" Jackson and is directed by Asif Akbar; Sakai is credited as a co-writer.

In February 2015, Sakai's debut novel Romeo & Juliet Vs. Zombies was released by Luthando Coeur, the fantasy imprint of Zharmae Publishing Press.

Sakai has also graduated from the University of Southern California's Masters of Professional Writing program and has also held several filmmaking fellowships, including Visual Communications "Armed With A Camera" Fellowship for Emerging Media Artists and Film Independent's Project Involve. He currently lives in Los Angeles and is also affiliated with the Japanese American National Museum. He is also a contributor to 8-Asians.com and Discover Nikkei.

He wrote the screenplay the 2024 film Damaged, starring Samuel L. Jackson and Vincent Cassel.
