= Simon Kuke =

Thai stuntman and actor (born 1981)

- Born: Sarut Khanwilai (formerly Suchat Khanwilai) ไซม่อน กุ๊ก; 1981 (age 44–45); Kalasin province, Thailand
- Education: The Institute of Physical Education Mahasarakham – Bachelor of Science Program in Sports Science; University (postgraduate) Institute of Physical Education, Srinakharinwirot University, Bangkok, Thailand
- Occupations: Actor; action choreographer; director; producer
- Years active: 2004–present

Simon Kuke (also written as Simon Kook) is a Thai actor, action choreographer, director, and producer.

== Background ==
Kuke, whose Thai name is Sarut Khanwilai (formerly Suchat Khanwilai; Thai: ศรุต ขันวิไล, สุชาติ ขันวิไล), was born in Kalasin province. He liked action films since childhood, especially martial arts films and the Shaw Brothers' wuxia films. His favorite actors included Bruce Lee, Jackie Chan, Jet Li, and legendary Thai action star Panna Rittikrai.

While he was a freshman at the Institute of Physical Education Mahasarakham, Tony Jaa, who was an upperclassman, would put on a stunt show for students to see. This impressed Kuke and served as his inspiration to become a stuntman.

He started in the film industry by persuading Panna Rittikrai to give him a role as stand-in for Tony Jaa in Tom-Yum-Goong (2005) and Ong Bak 2 (2008); in the meantime, he also acted in several films under Sahamongkol Film International such as The Bodyguard (2004), Scared (2005), Mercury Man (2006), The Bodyguard 2 (2007), Yamada: The Samurai of Ayothaya (2010), and the Malaysian film 8 Jam (2012). He has worked in the film industry for over 15 years.

In 2011, Kuke featured in the low-budget comedy film The Microchip as a supporting actor. In 2015, he co-starred with Donnie Yen in the Hong Kong kung fu film Ip Man 3 as "Suchart", a Muay Thai assassin. In the film, he fights with Ip Man, played by Yen, in a small elevator and a narrow staircase.

In 2017, he starred in the Thai television series Last Legend on Channel 7 as "Nan Kam", the Northern fighter; this character plays an important role from the 12th episode until the end of the series.

== Filmography ==
=== Film ===
List of film appearances, with year, title, and role shown
Year	Title	Role	Notes
2004	The Bodyguard		Stunts
2005	Tom-Yum-Goong		Stunt double: Tony Jaa
2005	Scared		Uncredited
2006	Mercury Man		Uncredited
2007	The Bodyguard 2		Stunts
2008	Ong Bak 2		Stunt double: Tony Jaa
2010	Yamada: The Samurai of Ayothaya		Uncredited
2010	Bangkok Knockout		Stunts
2011	The Microchip	Captain Nat	listed as Simon Kook on IMDb
2012	8 Jam	Thai Thug	Uncredited
2013	Lari	Rafie	
2014	Skin Trade		Stunt double: Tony Jaa
2015	Ip Man 3	Muay Thai fighter	
2016	The Last Assignment / Ib Ntsais Muang 2	Sam	
2018	Vampire Reborn		
2020	Dinh Mu Suong		
2020	Red Cargo	Kham	
2022	Fistful of Vengeance		
2023	The Great Escape		

=== Television ===
List of television appearances, with year, title, and role shown
Year	Title	Role	Notes
2017	Last Legend	Nan Kam	
2018	Lep Krut	Hag Liam	
