= Brutality =

Brutality or brutal most commonly refers to:

- Violence, physical force unlawfully exercised toward property and/or persons
  - Battery (crime)
  - Police brutality

Brutality or brutal may also refer to:

== Media ==
- Brutal: Paws of Fury, a 1994 video game
- Brutal (film), a 1980 Filipino film
- Brutality (film), a 1912 film
- Brutal (Black Uhuru album), 1986
- Brutal (Dr. Sin album), 1995
- "Brutal" (song), a 2021 Olivia Rodrigo song
- Brutal, a 2016 album by Moka Only
- Brutal, a 2007 film directed by Ethan Wiley

== Other uses ==
- Brutality (Mortal Kombat), a finishing move in the video game Mortal Kombat
- Brutalist architecture, an architectural style

== See also ==
- Brutalism (disambiguation)
