= Roel Reiné =

Dutch film director (born 1970)

- Born: 15 July 1970 (age 56); Netherlands
- Occupation: Film director
- Years active: 1990 – present
- Website: www.roelreine.com

Roel Reiné (/ruːl ˈreɪnə/), is a Dutch film director, born 15 July 1970 in Eindhoven. Occasionally he uses the alias John Rebel (Bear, Wolf Town). His production company is called Rebel Film.

== Career ==
Reiné was initially a director of television series and films in his home country. He moved to Hollywood and began specializing in direct to DVD sequels such as Death Race 2 and Hard Target 2. He also became involved with television in the United States, directing episodes of Inhumans, Wu Assassins and Halo. He is also a cinematographer on many of his projects.

== Filmography ==
=== Series ===
- "De uitdaging" (1990)
- "12 steden, 13 ongelukken" (1990)
- "Sam sam" (1994)
- "Voor hete vuren" (1995)
- "Brutale meiden" (1997)
- "Sterker dan drank" (1997)
- "'t Zal je gebeuren..." (1998)
- "De aanklacht" (2000)
- "Verkeerd verbonden" (2000)
- Blood Drive (2017)
- Inhumans (2017)
- Wu Assassins (2019)
- Halo (2022)

=== Film ===
Feature film

- No More Control (1996)
- Carwars (1999)
- The Delivery (1999)
- Adrenaline (2003)
- Deadwater (2007)
- Drifter (2008)
- The Forgotten Ones (2009)
- The Marine 2 (2009)
- Bear (2010)
- The Lost Tribe (2010)
- 12 Rounds 2: Reloaded (2013)
- The Condemned 2 (2015)
- Michiel de Ruyter (2015)
- Redbad (2018)
- Fistful of Vengeance (2022)
- Classified (2024)
- Savage Hunt (2025)

Direct-to-video

- Pistol Whipped (2008)
- Death Race 2 (2010)
- The Scorpion King 3: Battle for Redemption (2012)
- Death Race 3: Inferno (2013)
- Dead in Tombstone (2013)
- SEAL Team 8: Behind Enemy Lines (2014)
- The Man with the Iron Fists 2 (2015)
- Hard Target 2 (2016)
- Dead Again in Tombstone (2017)
