= Living Films =

Thai film production company

- Industry: Film production
- Founded: July 7, 1996; 30 years ago
- Founder: Chris Lowenstein
- Headquarters: Chiang Mai, Thailand
- Key people: Chris Lowenstein (Executive director)
- Website: www.livingfilms.com

Living Films is an international film production company based in Thailand. They have produced feature films, documentaries, commercials, and television series including The Hangover Part II, Shanghai (2010 film), and Changeland. Its most recent projects include the Netflix / BBC TV series The Serpent (TV series), the Netflix film Fistful of Vengeance, Ron Howard’s film Thirteen Lives, episodes of Disney’s series Ms. Marvel (miniseries), and the FX series Alien: Earth.

== History ==
Living Films was founded by Chris Lowenstein in 1996. Lowenstein studied film at Beloit College in Wisconsin and began his career as a production assistant for Gus Van Sant working on the film My Own Private Idaho. He also worked as a production assistant for the Thailand filming of Heaven & Earth in 1993. After similar work with the films Operation Dumbo Drop and The Quest, Lowenstein opened his own production company in Chiang Mai. Oliver Ackermann joined Living Films in 2002 and is a partner and producer. Apinat “Obb” Siricharoenjit is also a managing partner and a line producer. Living Films produces feature films, commercials, still-photo shoots and television projects.

In 2006, during the filming of Bangkok Dangerous starring Nicolas Cage, the ruling government of Thailand was overthrown. In 2013, A fire broke out on the set of No Escape (then called The Coup) starring Owen Wilson, Pierce Brosnan, and Lake Bell. There were no injuries to cast and production had wrapped for the day. The fire was thought to have been caused by faulty power supply.

== Filmography ==
=== Film ===
Year	Title	Notes
1997	With Hope and Help	Documentary
2002	City of Ghosts	
2003	The Medallion	Co-production with Emperor Group
2004	Simon	
2004	Sacred Planet	Co-production with Walt Disney Pictures; IMAX documentary feature
2005	Vampires: The Turning	
2007	Paperbird	
2008	Angel	
2008	Bangkok Dangerous	Co-production with Saturn Films and Blue Star Entertainment
2009	No Love in the City	
2009	The Marine 2	Co-production with WWE Studios and 20th Century Fox
2009	Formosa Betrayed	
2010	Nomads	
2010	How About Love	
2010	Crossing Salween	
2010	Shanghai	Co-production with Phoenix Pictures
2011	Whores' Glory	
2011	Killing the Chickens, to Scare the Monkeys	Short film
2011	The Hangover Part II	Co-production with Legendary Entertainment
2012	Dzhungli	
2012	Teddy Bear	
2013	Kill Buljo 2	
2013	Gutted	
2014	Famous Five 3	
2015	Twilight over Burma	
2015	River	
2015	The Man with the Iron Fists 2	Co-production with Arcade Pictures
2015	No Escape	Co-production with Bold Films
2016	In the Blood	
2016	Hard Target 2	
2016	Gold	Co-production with Boies/Schiller Films
2016	The 5th Wave	Co-production with Columbia Pictures, GK Films, and LStar Capital
2017	Women, Drugs and Kathmandu	Documentary
2019	Changeland	Co-production with Stoopid Buddy Stoodios
2020	Tremors: Shrieker Island	Co-production with Universal Pictures Home Entertainment
2021	Infinite	Production with Paramount Pictures
2022	Thirteen Lives	Production with Imagine Entertainment
2022	Fistful of Vengeance	
2022	The Gray Man (2022 film)	
2022	The Greatest Beer Run Ever	
2022	Tár	
2024	Mother of the Bride	
2026	The Devil's Mouth	

=== Television ===
Year	Title	Notes
2005	Mysterious Island	Hallmark Channel TV movie
2005–08	Matrioshki	
2006	Blackbeard	Hallmark Channel TV movie
2010	20 to One	
2010	Survivor	
2013	The Hunters	Hallmark Channel TV movie
2015	The Legacy	
2021	The Serpent (TV series)	
2022	Ms. Marvel (miniseries)	
2025	Alien: Earth	
