= Frédéric Lepage =

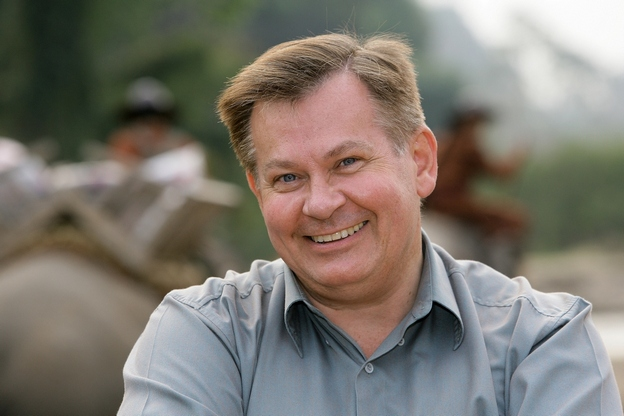
Frédéric Lepage

Frédéric Lepage is a French author, theater and screenplay writer, and producer of several hundreds programs and documentaries.

== Career ==
=== Literary career ===
Frédéric Lepage is a best-selling author of novels such as La Fin du septième jour or La Mémoire interdite, published in numerous countries including France, Germany, Japan and Greece. He has also written essays on various subjects from science (Les Jumeaux: enquête) to gastronomy (A table avec Chirac) with a detour for an anthology of the world's most beautiful prayers.

In 2008 he created a series of four fiction books for children, Micah et les voix de la jungle, which at this writing has four volumes: Le Camp des éléphants, La Malédiction de Mara, Le Masque du serpent and Piège de sang. This series won several awards and literary prizes.

In March 2011 his novel Le Colloque des bonobos (Editions Balland) was published. This work asks the question: are chimpanzees and human genetically similar to the extent that they must be placed on the same evolutionary branch? The author imagined a conference organized to respond to the question. Experts from Africa debating the question are all... chimpanzees. They must decide if they will accept to become brothers to humans. This novel is based on scientific research validated by Sandrine Prat, paleontologist in charge of research at the French National Centre for Scientific Research.

As an editor at Éditions Michel Lafon, Frédéric Lepage supervised the publication of Julien Lepers' book, "Les fautes de français, plus jamais" in 2012. Then came, in 2014, by the same author, Les mauvaises manières, ça suffit!.

In 2016, his novel Il Congresso delle scimmie was published by Editions Robin (Italy).

In 2017, Frédéric Lepage met Alexandre Lafont, a 20-year-old epileptic on the verge of becoming a YouTube star by talking about his illness with humor and self-mockery. He suggested that he write his story with him, and that of this illness that affects 800,000 French people each year. The book, Je suis Epilepticman, was published in April 2018 by Éditions Plon.

September 2019: publication of Le Concile des singes in digital edition.

2021: publication of the novel Criminal Kingdom (in French: Si la bête s'éveille, lit. 'If the beast awakens') by Éditions Plon, which won the Prize for the best French-language novel 2021 at the Polar Festival of Cognac.

His novel Promets moi d'avoir peur was published by Éditions Robert Laffont in March 2023, then by Pocket Publishing in 2024.

In September 2024, his novel Plus fort que la nuit was published by Éditions Taurnada.

Frederic Lepage's novel Le Livre des sacrifiés is to be published by Robert Laffont Publishing in January 2025.

=== Audiovisual career ===
Frédéric Lepage began his career as a television writer and producer at TF1. Following a stint at Antenne 2, he created his own company XL Productions. The company quickly grew and was innovative notably in the domain of documentary films. The company produced a wide range of programming: giant concerts (La Fête de la Musique for TF1), TV variety shows, literary magazines (Ex-Libris) or the game show Dessinez, c’est gagné!. In 1990 the company launched the children's program Disney Club with The Walt Disney Company. Later, Frédéric Lepage ran the documentary department of the Group Tele Images Productions.

Frédéric Lepage makes his mark in the domain of large scale documentary series, such as in 1996 with Untamed Africa, a team effort with the director Laurent Frapat. This twelve-hour series, touted by reviewers, was a success in more than one hundred countries. Other Untamed followed, forming a cycle of close to sixty films and one of the biggest commercial successes in the domain of wildlife films: Untamed Amazonia, Untamed Australia, Untamed Asia, Untamed America.

Concurrently with his Untamed or previous to them, Frédéric Lepage wrote and produced other series such as Les Sanctuaires sauvages, Tant qu’il y aura des bêtes directed by Jean-Baptiste Erreca, Les Nouveaux sanctuaires, Blue Beyond, Les Nuits sauvages, Super Plants and Genesis II et l’homme créa la nature, directed by Jean-Baptiste Erreca and Laurent Frapat. Artists such as Anggun or actors John Hurt, Lambert Wilson, Pierre Arditi, Brian Cox and Tcheky Karyo collaborated on these projects.

In 2005, Frédéric Lepage wrote and produced Brûlez Rome ! a docu-fiction that takes the audience to Rome behind the scenes in the time of Nero's empire. This production featured thousands of supernumerary actors and a meticulous reconstruction of first century Rome erected in the Tunisian desert.

In 2009 and 2010, Frédéric Lepage wrote and produced Extinctions, a six-hour international documentary coproduction on the mechanisms of the extinction of several emblematic species. This series success led him to write and produce the sequel in six episodes, entitled Saved from Extinction.

In 2011, he wrote and produced Last Chance Tiger and in 2012 Six Feet Under the Savannah, Requiem for an Elephant, Norin's Ark and The Funny Side of Science.

Frédéric Lepage is also the author-director of a successful political film, A table avec les politiques, which depicts how we can deduct politicians’ eating habits from their ideological orientations. Another film in the same series, Political Animals was aired in 2010 on France 3.

The group led by Frédéric Lepage, comprising the companies Jukurpa Media, FL Concepts & co and Stratus Factory, bought the press agency Interscoop in 2010 which was created in 1983 by Frédéric Laffont and Christophe de Ponfilly. Frédéric Lepage also owns a musical publishing company, A440 Publishing.

=== Fiction ===
Released in France in December 2008, Sunny and the Elephant is Frédéric Lepage's first feature film. A sweeping adventure film destined for international and family audiences. It was shot regions of Thailand near Burma. The soundtrack was composed by Joe Hisaishi.

In 2022, Frédéric Lepage created, with Caroline Glorion and Marc Eisenchteter, the concept of Flair de famille, a collection of films for France Télévisions, and the screenplay for its first episode, entitled Rouge sang. A Mercer/Federation Entertainment production (Thorunn Anspach and Olivier Brémond), with Sylvie Testud and Samuel Labarthe, which ranked first in the France 2 ratings on April 8, 2023. Due to this success, France Télévisions then commissioned the second film in the collection. This second film, Envie de meurtre, broadcast on February 24, 2024, also topped the ratings. A third film, Guet apens, was shot during summer 2024.

Frédéric Lepage's musical show, Marcel & Reynaldo, which tells the story of the romantic, then friendly, relationship between Marcel Proust and the composer Reynaldo Hahn, was created at the Théâtre du Gymnase Marie-Bell on April 20, 2023, with Thomas Marfoglia in the role of Reynaldo Hahn, and Jean-Christophe Brétignière or Jean-Baptiste Carnoye. In 2024, Frédéric Lepage wrote a show for Magloire Delcros Varaud entitled Prière d'aimer, performed at the Théâtre du Gymnase Marie-Bell.

== Activities in Asia ==
In december 2017, Frédéric Lepage published Bonjour China, a guide of France intended for Chinese tourists, with a preface by Jean-Pierre Raffarin. It was published by a consortium: China Light Industry Press, Phoenix, and Hachette/China. A version in French was published by Fei Publishing.

Fréderic Lepage created a professional training structure for French tourism professionals working with Chinese tourists, called Bonjour China Formation.

In 2016 France Mon Amour was created, a television channel promoting France in China on the VIVA platform.

=== Additional information ===
Frédéric Lepage is a member of the Institut et du Séminaire Multi-Médias (promotion Jean Renoir).

Beginning in December 1993, Frédéric Lepage was named to a committee of four experts mandated by the Ministre de la Communication to develop the project Chaîne de la Connaissance launched in 1994 under the name La Cinquième and known today as the channel, France 5.

As part of his work with the company Le Public Système, Frédéric Lepage was one of the organizers of the Manaus worldwide adventure film festival (Brazil) for several years. His company FL Concepts acts as a consultant for a certain number of well-known individuals, groups and public communities on their image and communication strategy.

== Private life ==
Frédéric Lepage lives in Paris and Bangkok.

Over the years he became knowledgeable about China and Southeast Asian civilizations, and he is a member of the Siam Society.
