= Jason Tobin =

Hong Kong-British actor

- Born: To Jun Wai (杜俊緯); 12 June 1974 (age 52); British Hong Kong
- Occupation: Actor
- Known for: Better Luck Tomorrow; Warrior; A Thousand Blows
- Movement: Asian American Film
- Spouse: Michelle Lau
- Children: 3

Jason Tobin
- Traditional Chinese: 杜俊緯
Transcriptions
Yue: Cantonese
- Jyutping: dou6 zeon3 wai5

Jason Tobin (born 12 June 1974), credited in Chinese as To Jun Wai (Chinese: 杜俊緯) is a Hong Kong-British film and television actor. He is known for his role as Young Jun in the HBO MAX series Warrior and as Mr. Lao in the Disney+ series A Thousand Blows.

== Early life and education ==
Tobin was born in Hong Kong, where he attended the King George V School in Kowloon. He also attended boarding schools in the UK. His father is English and his mother is Chinese. After graduating from high school, he moved to Los Angeles, California to pursue an acting career.

== Career ==
Tobin has appeared in several films and television productions. His breakout film was Better Luck Tomorrow by Justin Lin, starring alongside Parry Shen, Sung Kang, Roger Fan and John Cho, which debuted at Sundance Festival. In New York Magazine, critic Bilge Ebiri described enjoying "...one cracker jack performance, in Jason Tobin’s unbridled portrayal of a hyper, horny, and confused brat." Featuring the adventures of four overachievers, the film is widely praised for breaking the model minority stereotype of Asian Americans on screen. 17 years later, Los Angeles Times named it the best Asian American film of all time after review by critics.

Tobin was one of several Better Luck Tomorrow cast members alongside Sung Kang to appear in the Fast & Furious franchise movies starting with The Fast and the Furious: Tokyo Drift, where he portrayed one of Han's crew members and Sean's friend named Earl. He later reprised the character in F9.

He starred as the Eddy Tsai, the lead role in the Asian American "serial killer" film Chink, directed by Stanley Yung, written by Koji Steven Sakai and produced by Quentin Lee. For his performance in Chink (re-titled as #1 Serial Killer), Tobin won a "Best Actor" or "Breakout Performance for an Actor" award at the 2013 Los Angeles Asian Pacific Film Festival. He also received a "Best Actor - Dramatic" award at the 2015 Los Angeles Asian Pacific Film Festival for his performance in the film Jasmine (2015).

In 2018, he reunited with director Justin Lin to star in the Cinemax series Warrior, a martial arts drama based on an original idea by the late Bruce Lee and produced by his daughter Shannon Lee. The Hollywood Reporter described Tobin "as a source of both unpredictable line-readings and humor", while The New York Times pointed out his charismatic performance. The series was renewed for a second season and third season until it was eventually cancelled in December 2023.

In February 2021, Tobin was cast as William Pan in the Netflix film Fistful of Vengeance. It was released on 17 February 2022.

In 2025, he stars in the Edward Berger film The Ballad of a Small Player with Colin Farrell and The Undeclared War with Simon Pegg. He is currently shooting Kung Fu Deadly in Dublin Ireland.

== Personal life ==
Tobin resides in Hong Kong, London, England and Sydney, Australia. He has a wife and three children.

He was influenced by Bruce Lee who inspired him when he was a child.

== Filmography ==
=== Film ===
Year	Title	Role	Notes
1998	Yellow	Yo-Yo	Directed by Chris Chan Lee
2002	Better Luck Tomorrow	Virgil Hu	Directed by Justin Lin
2005	House of Fury	Rocco's fighter	Directed by Stephen Fung
2006	Rob-B-Hood	Debt Collector	Directed by Benny Chan
2006	The Heavenly Kings	Sandy	Directed by Daniel Wu
2006	The Fast and the Furious: Tokyo Drift	Earl	Directed by Justin Lin and written by Chris Morgan
2012	Chink	Eddy Tsai	Directed by Stanley Yung, written by Koji Steven Sakai, produced by Quentin Lee (Winner of Best Actor Award at the 2013 Los Angeles Asian Pacific Film Festival)
2015	Jasmine	Leonard To	Directed and written by Dax Phelan (Winner of Best Actor - Dramatic Award at the 2015 Los Angeles Asian Pacific Film Festival)
2015	Pound of Flesh	Liam	Directed by Ernie Barbarash
2019	Sonora: The Devil's Highway	Lee Wong	Directed by Alejandro Springall, written by Guillermo Munro Palacio and John Sayles
2021	F9	Earl	Directed by Justin Lin, written by Justin Lin and Daniel Casey
2022	Fistful of Vengeance	William Pan	Directed by Roel Reiné, written by Cameron Litvack
2025	Ballad of a Small Player	Mr. Huan	Directed by Edward Berger, written by Rowan Joffé
2027	John Rambo		Post-production

=== Television ===
Year	Title	Role	Notes
2019–2023	Warrior	Young Jun	
2025-2026	A Thousand Blows	Lao Lam	
2026	Vigil	Huang Chen	
2026	The Undeclared War	Nicky Chan	

=== Awards ===
- Best Actor, Chink (also known as #1 Serial Killer), 2013 Los Angeles Asian Pacific Film Festival
- Best Actor - Dramatic, Jasmine, 2015 Los Angeles Asian Pacific Film Festival
- Best Actor - Jasmine, 2016 London Independent Film Awards
- Best Actor - Jasmine, 2017 International Independent Film Awards
