= Dax Phelan =

American screenwriter, producer, and director

- Born: July 8, 1975 (age 50)
- Occupations: Screenwriter; producer; director

Dax Phelan (born July 8, 1975) is an American screenwriter, producer, and director, known for his work on such independent films as The Canyons, She's Lost Control, Jasmine, and The Other Side of the Wind. In 2018 the LA Film Awards listed Dax in their article "30 promising filmmakers you should follow." In September 2018, The Hollywood Reporter announced that Dax had acquired exclusive rights to develop the real-life story of Jennifer Murray, a British housewife and mother who, at 54, learned to fly when her husband bought a half share in a helicopter. A few years later, she became the first woman to pilot a helicopter around the world in a solo flight.
