= Feodor Chin =

American actor, producer, director and writer

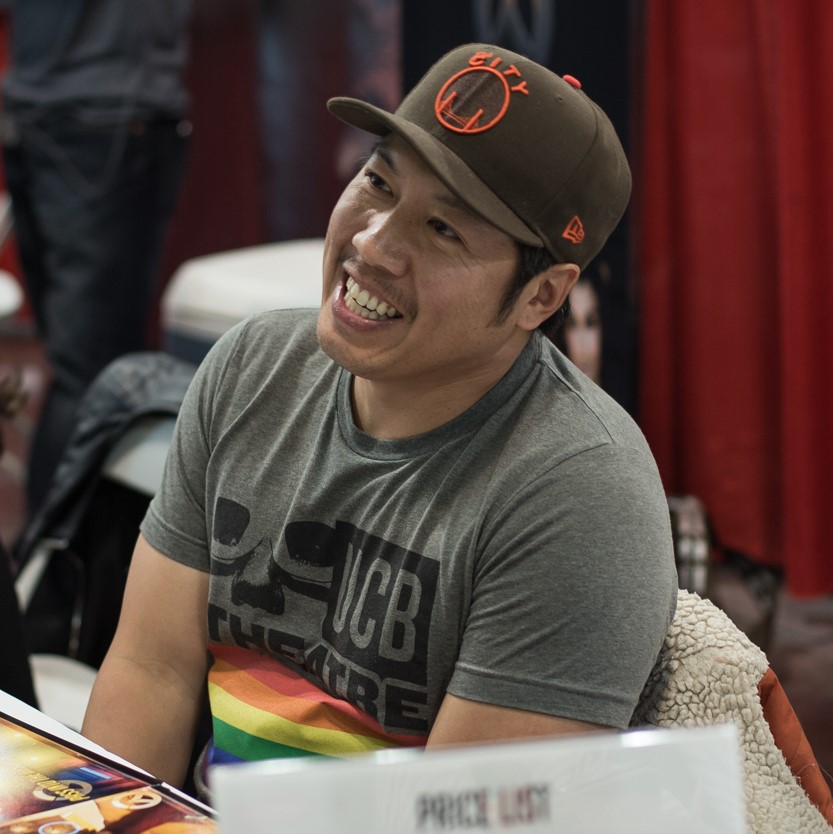
- Chin at the 2017 Comic Con Revolution
- Born: San Francisco, California, U.S.
- Occupations: Actor, producer, writer, director
- Years active: 2000–present
- Spouse: Jessica Rau (m. 2018)
- Website: http://feodorchin.com

Feodor Chin is an American actor, writer, and comedian from San Francisco, California. As an actor, he was classically trained at UCLA, the American Conservatory Theater, and has studied with renowned acting coach, Larry Moss. He was a Maude Night performer at Upright Citizens Brigade Theatre for three seasons. TV credits include Big Little Lies, Good Trouble, American Auto, Pam & Tommy, Medical Police, Lethal Weapon, Jane the Virgin, The Affair, Speechless, and New Girl. Animation credits include the title role in Netflix's Uncle from Another World, Futurama, Marvel's Hit-Monkey and What If...?, and Cartoon Network's Regular Show. He is the voice of Zenyatta and Lee Sin in the hit video games, Overwatch / Overwatch 2 and League of Legends. He was a performer for the ABC Discovers Talent Showcase and a writer for the CBS Diversity Comedy Showcase.

== Early life ==
Chin was born and raised in San Francisco, California, and attended Lowell High School where he found an interest in acting, taking drama classes and performing in musicals in the Carol Channing auditorium (named for one of Lowell's most notable alumni). He is a graduate of the University of California, Los Angeles, and though his major was Communication Studies, he spent most of his time in the theater department, taking classes and acting in plays and student films. He trained at the American Conservatory Theater in San Francisco and the Upright Citizens Brigade Theater.

== Career ==
=== Film, television, and writing ===
Feodor made his SXSW Film Festival debut in 2023 as the fertility doctor in Leah McKendrick's comedy about a broke, single millennial freezing her eggs, Scrambled from Lionsgate.

Under his banner Iron Oxide Productions, Chin wrote, directed and starred in the short film Spice It Up, which won an Audience Choice Award at the 2011 HollyShorts Film Festival. Chin wrote, produced and starred in the TV Pilot Golden Boy (directed by William Lu), which screened at the Los Angeles Asian Pacific Film Festival and the DisOrient Film Festival.

Chin wrote a pilot, along with Will Henning, for a TV series titled Chinatown Squad, about a police squad responsible for cleaning up corruption in 1890 San Francisco Chinatown and which Stephane Gauger directed and produced. In it, he stars as Pistol Pete, a Chinatown mob boss who dons European clothes, a character who is also based on the real-life historical figure of Little Pete. The pilot also stars Baby co-stars David Huynh and Robert Wu, as well as Kelvin Han Yee. He received an Honorable Mention for the screenplay at the 2014 Los Angeles Asian Pacific Film Festival - Project Catalyst.

Chin played the antagonist "Benny" in Juwan Chung's Baby opposite the protagonist "Baby", played by David Huynh - the film won a Special Jury Award for Best Feature Length Film, Narrative at the 2007 Los Angeles Asian Pacific Film Festival, among other accolades.

On TV, Chin has appeared on Big Little Lies (as Kevin), The Affair (as Chen), Jane the Virgin (as Dr. Park), Lethal Weapon (as The Florist), Future Man (as the Bartender), Weird City (as Doctor Lance), and Good Trouble (as Jian). Chin has also appeared as "Dan Chang" in the Lifetime film Lost Boy, opposite Virginia Madsen.

=== Voicework ===
Chin may be best known for his voicework in video games, most notably voicing the robot monk Zenyatta in Blizzard Entertainment's game Overwatch and its sequel Overwatch 2, and the reworked Lee Sin in Riot Games' League of Legends. Other notable roles include Harunobu Adachi (both voice and PCAP) and the blind musician Yamato in Ghost of Tsushima, and Splinter in Teenage Mutant Ninja Turtles: Out of the Shadows.

Chin voiced the title character of Ojisan/Uncle in the Netflix English-language version of the Japanese anime series Uncle from Another World. He has also voiced characters in animated series such as Marvel's Hit-Monkey (as Police Captain, The Real Rooster, News Anchor, Baldy, etc.), Cartoon Network's Regular Show (as Earl, Game and Joe), and the animated short Legendary Place (as Baba Lee) created by Calvin Wong, which screened on Cartoon Network and was also produced by Cartoon Network Studios. Chin voiced the main villain "Evil Lord" in the animated CG film Monkey King: Hero is Back, also starring the voices of Jackie Chan and James Hong. He took over the supporting role of Amy Wong's father Leo Wong in the 2023 revival of Futurama, replacing Billy West.

Feodor has narrated over 100 audiobooks and is a five-time Earphones Award Winner from AudioFile. He has narrated such titles as Timothy Dalrymple's Jeremy Lin: The Reason for the Linsanity and received an Earphones Award from AudioFile for his narration of Snakehead by Patrick Raden Keefe and for his narration of Richard C. Morais' Buddhaland Brooklyn and has added his voice to "Books on Tapes" selections including Hotel on the Corner of Bitter and Sweet, Jay Caspian Kang's The Dead Do Not Improve, Ed Lin's Ghost Month, Joyful Wisdom, Journey of a Thousand Miles, and The Physics of the Impossible.

Starting in season 8 of Futurama, Chin became the new voices of Leo Wong and Scoop Chang who were previously voiced in earlier seasons by Billy West and Maurice LaMarche.

=== Theatrical and stage work ===
Feodor Chin returned to the Bay Area in the Spring of 2024 to make his Berkeley Repertory Theatre debut in the West Coast Premiere of The Far Country, Lloyd Suh's Pulitzer Prize for Drama finalist play. In this critically acclaimed play set in San Francisco and Angel Island Immigration Station during the years of the Chinese Exclusion Act, Chin portrayed Gee, "the witty antihero" and "sharp entrepreneur" seeking to bring a paper son back from China to help him build his laundry business and an unconventional family.

Chin has also appeared on stage at The Colony Theater as "Jinwu" in Climbing Everest, as Malcolm in A Noise Within theater's production of Macbeth, as Dr. Albert Chang in John Pollono's Rules of Seconds, as George Deever in The Matrix Theater Company's multi-racial production of Arthur Miller's All My Sons, as Mr. Wang in Uranium Madhouse's production of Bertolt Brecht's A Man's a Man, A Winter People, Chay Yew's adaptation of The Cherry Orchard at the Boston Court in Pasadena, as Chester in Artist at Play's production of Michael Golamco's Cowboy Versus Samurai, and various plays with the Lodestone Theatre Ensemble, including Claim to Fame, Grace Kim and the Spiders from Mars, Ten to Life, Choke, in the Company of Angels production of Henry Ong's Fabric and in Chalk Repertory Theater's productions of Oscar Wilde's Lady Windermere's Fan, The Flash Festival at the La Brea Tar Pits, The Debate Over Courtney O'Connell of Columbus, and in Anton Chekov's Three Sisters (as Andrei Sergeevich Prozorov) opposite Joy Osmanski and Ricardo Antonio Chavira, which was staged at the Historic Masonic Lodge at the Hollywood Forever Cemetery in Los Angeles.

== Filmography ==
=== Film ===
Year	Title	Role	Notes	Source
2001	Troy & Julie	Greg		
2007	Baby	Benny		
2007	ATF: Asian Task Force	David	Short film	
2009	La La Land	Henry	Television film	
2009	Golden Boy	Scott Wong	Television film; also writer and producer	
2010	Spice It Up!	Man	Short film; also writer, director and producer	
2011	Law & Chicoban	Bronson Law	Television film; also writer	
2012	Chinatown Squad	Pistol Pete	Television film; also writer	
2012	Keye Luke	Keye Luke	Short film; also writer	
2012	The Moral Paper Route	Father	Video short	
2012	Raskal Love	Vanna's Father		
2012	Goodbye Kitty	Spencer	Short film	
2013	Hidden Hills	Oriental Oscar		
2013	Guitar Hero	Hoodlum #1	Short film	
2014	Anita Ho	Cousin Bruce		
2015	1st Date	Gary Fong		
2015	Monkey King: Hero Is Back	Evil Lord (voice)	English version	
2015	Lost Boy	Dan Chang	Television film	
2015	Jackson Arms	Chuin		
2016	Comfort	Cute Couple (Man)		
2016	Miss Stevens	Guy Next to Her	Uncredited	
2017	Two Wongs Make a White	Lester Ching	Video short	
2017	The Vomit Solution to Thirsty Men	Man at Restaurant 1	Short film	
2022	40ish	Ron	Short film	
2022	The Unquiet Dead	Dr. Burke	Short film	
2023	Scrambled	Doctor	Feature film	
2023	Godzilla Minus One	Additional voices	English dub	

=== Television ===
Year	Title	Role	Notes	Source
2001	Nash Bridges	Jay	Episode: "Blood Bots"	
2011–2012	Slanted	Truman	3 episodes	
2013	Bunheads	Jason	Episode: "You Wanna See Something?"	
2013	The Bold and the Beautiful	International Buyer	3 episodes	
2013	The Mindy Project	Karate Guy	Episode: "Christmas Party Sex Trap"	
2014–2015	Film Lab Presents	Henry, Obnoxious Guy, Guy in Bar	7 episodes	
2015	Down & Out	Cell Phone Guy	Episode: "Everybody Out!"	
2016	New Girl	Waiter	Episode: "Return to Sender"	
2016	Lopez	John	Episode: "George Goes All In"	
2016–2017	Regular Show	Earl, Joel, Game (voice)	4 episodes	
2018	Jane the Virgin	Dr. Park	Episode: "Chapter Seventy-Eight"	
2018	The Affair	Chen	Episode: "Episode #4.5"	
2018	Speechless	Man	Episode: "L-O-N-- LONDON: Part 1"	
2018	Legendary Place	Baba Lee (voice)	Pilot	
2019	Weird City	Doctor Lance	Episode: "Go to College"	
2019	Lethal Weapon	The Florist	Episode: "A Game of Chicken"	
2019	Good Trouble	Jian	Episode: "Vitamin C"	
2019	Big Little Lies	Kevin	Episode: "Kill Me"	
2020	Medical Police	Lead Detective	Episode: "Everybody Panic!"	
2020	Bulge Bracket	Bolo	Series regular	
2021	Hit-Monkey	Various voices	Recurring role	
2022	Pam & Tommy	1st AD on Baywatch set, VH1 Behind the Music voice	2 episodes	
2022	Curious George	Bellhop #1 (voice)	Episode: "Hawai'i"	
2022–2023	Uncle from Another World	Ojisan (English voice)	Series regular	
2023	Welcome to Chippendales	Prison Guard #2	Episode: "Switzerland"	
2023	American Auto	Eric	Episode: "Hack"	
2023	What If...?	Xu Wenwu (voice)	2 episodes	
2023	Ōoku: The Inner Chambers	Matsudaira Nobutsuna, Jiro (voice)	English version	
2023	Akuma-kun	Shiba (voice)	English version	
2023–present	Futurama	Leo Wong, Scoop Chang (voice)	Replaced Billy West and Maurice LaMarche	
2024	Secret Level	Thug (voice)	Episode: "Sifu: It Takes a Life"	
2025	Love, Death & Robots	Jade Prime, Diego (voice)	Episode: "Spider Rose"	
2025	Marvel Zombies	Xu Wenwu (voice)	Episode: "Episode 2"	
2026	Star Wars: Visions Presents – The Ninth Jedi	Gennoh (voice)	English dub	

=== Video games ===
Year	Title	Role	Source
2002	New Legends	Sun Soo, Flyer, Prison Guard #1	
2011	League of Legends	Lee Sin	
2012	Sleeping Dogs	Tran	
2012	World of Warcraft: Mists of Pandaria	Mudmug	
2012	XCOM: Enemy Unknown	Shaojie Zhang	
2013	Aliens: Colonial Marines	Weyland Yutani Commandos	
2013	The Bureau: XCOM Declassified	Additional voices	
2013	Teenage Mutant Ninja Turtles: Out of the Shadows	Splinter	
2015	Evolve	Additional voices	
2016	XCOM 2	U.S. Soldier	
2016	Overwatch	Zenyatta	
2018	Paladins	Zhin	
2018	Metal Gear Survive	Dan	
2018	Red Dead Redemption 2	Additional voices	
2020	Ghost of Tsushima	Harunobu Adachi, Yamato, Goro	
2020	Wasteland 3	Marshal Darius Kwon	
2020	Yakuza: Like a Dragon	Additional voices	
2022	Ghostwire: Tokyo	Hannya, Man C	
2022	Overwatch 2	Zenyatta	
2024	Like a Dragon: Infinite Wealth	Masafumi Narasaki	
2025	Ghost of Yōtei	Lord Saitō	
2026	Yakuza Kiwami 3 & Dark Ties	Emoto, additional voices	
