= Nathan Jung =

Chinese American actor and stuntman (1946–2021)

- Born: November 29, 1946; Bakersfield, California, U.S.
- Died: April 24, 2021 (aged 74); Los Angeles, California, U.S.
- Occupations: Actor, stuntman

Nathan Jung (November 29, 1946 – April 24, 2021) was an American actor and stuntman. Due to his height, he was usually cast in "heavy" or "enforcer" roles.

== Career ==
=== Television ===
Jung played the character of Genghis Khan on Star Trek: The Original Series in the episode, "The Savage Curtain" (1969), an axe-wielding villain named "The Dark Rider" who fought David Carradine in the TV series Kung Fu on the episode "Arrogant Dragon" (1974), and appeared opposite Bruce Lee as a Tong Enforcer in Lee's only pure acting (and non-martial arts) role on the TV show Here Come the Brides, in the episode "Marriage, Chinese Style" (1969). Jung also played Saburyo, Helen Funai's cousin on an episode of Sanford and Son entitled "Home Sweet Home" (1974).

Jung appeared on a number of other TV shows including General Hospital (as Won Chu), Starsky and Hutch (as "Itchy" in the episode "Nightlight" (1976)), M*A*S*H (as the Korean Man), The Misadventures of Sheriff Lobo (as Kahuna), Manimal (as Tang), Magnum P.I. (as Yaikra), The A-Team (as Chi), Falcon Crest (as Chao-Li's cousin), The Hardy Boys/Nancy Drew Mysteries (as Cho-Lin), Hunter (as the henchman "Mongol" who goes toe-to-toe against Fred Dryer), Riptide (as Kona, Al Leong's colleague), Joe Forrester, and The New Mike Hammer. He appeared in two episodes of Lois & Clark: The New Adventures of Superman ("Chi of Steel" (1995) and "Illusions of Grandeur" (1994) - as "Jzuk-Mao"), in the pilot episode of Martial Law, "Shanghai Express" (1998) (as the villain Wen), as well as on Highway to Heaven (as Yoji), Burke's Law, Dear John and Tour of Duty.

=== Film ===
Jung acted in the films Surf Ninjas (as Leslie Nielsen's henchman, Manchu), in John Landis's first film, Kentucky Fried Movie (as the henchman Bulkus in the Enter the Dragon spoof segment entitled A Fistful of Yen), as The Wing Kong Hatchet Man in Big Trouble in Little China, as the Bonsai Club Manager in Showdown in Little Tokyo (speaking a line of dialogue in Japanese to stars Dolph Lundgren and Brandon Lee, making him one of the few actors to appear in movies or TV shows alongside both Bruce Lee and his son Brandon Lee), and also appeared in films such as Sam Raimi's Darkman (as the Chinese Warrior), The Shadow (as the Tibetan Kidnapper), American Yakuza (as The Big Yakuza), Beverly Hills Ninja (as the Fisherman), Corvette Summer (as the bouncer who roughs up Mark Hamill's character), and Longshot (as Odd Job).

Jung also acted in Asian American independent films such as Justin Lin's Finishing The Game (as Bob, the Nazi villain who faces off against Roger Fan's Breeze Loo) in the "Fists of Fuhrer" segment that was directed by Evan Jackson Leong and Juwan Chung's Baby (as the Restaurant Guy in a scene opposite David Huynh, who played the title character).

Jung also appears as himself, the narrator, in Timothy Tau's short documentary, Nathan Jung v. Bruce Lee, where he recounts the first time he met Bruce Lee (played by Jason Yee) on the set of the TV show Here Come the Brides in 1969 and with Allen Rowe portraying a younger version of him in narrative flashbacks.

== Personal life ==
Jung was born in Bakersfield, California; he had two older brothers. He died in Los Angeles on April 24, 2021, at the age of 74, of a heart attack after treatment for lymphoma and a fall. His death was covered by outlets including Variety, Deadline Hollywood, SyFy Wire, the New York Daily News, Heavy.com, Daily Star Trek News, Comicbook.com, Outsider, AsAm News, iHorror, Giant Freakin Robot, The Independent and The Daily Express in the UK, News.com.au and Yahoo! Lifestyle in Australia, and The New Zealand Herald.

== Selected filmography ==
=== Film ===
Year	Title	Role
2018	Nathan Jung v. Bruce Lee	Himself / The Narrator
2013	Jackhammer	Silky Samurai
2008	Baby	Restaurant Guy
2007	Finishing The Game	Bob
1997	Beverly Hills Ninja	Fisherman
1995	Galaxis	Real Deal Doorman
1994	Ghoulies IV	Big Inmate
1994	The Shadow	Tibetan Kidnapper
1993	American Yakuza	Big Yakuza
1993	Surf Ninjas	Manchu
1993	Army of One aka Joshua Tree	Chinese Gunman
1991	Showdown in Little Tokyo	Bonsai Club Manager
1990	Darkman	Chinese Warrior
1989	Black Rain	Sato's Enforcer
1986	Big Trouble in Little China	Wing Kong Hatchet Man
1981	Longshot	"Oddjob"
1978	Corvette Summer	The Bouncer
1978	Blind Rage	Henchman
1977	The Kentucky Fried Movie	Bulkus

=== TV ===
Year	Title	Episode	Role
1998	Martial Law	"Shanghai Express" (1998) (Pilot)	Wen
1995	Burke's Law	"Who Killed Mr. Game Show?" (1995)	Sumo Contestant
1995	Lois & Clark: The New Adventures of Superman	"Chi of Steel" (1995)	Jzuk-Mao
1994	Lois & Clark: The New Adventures of Superman	"Illusions of Grandeur" (1994)	Jzuk-Mao
1989	Highway to Heaven	"It's a Dog's Life" (1989)	Yoji
1989	Tour of Duty	"Lonesome Cowboy Blues" (1989)	The Bouncer
1987	The New Mike Hammer	"A Blinding Fear" (1987)	Security Guard
1984	The New Mike Hammer	"The Deadly Prey" (1984)	Man One
1986	The A-Team	"Point of No Return" (1986)	Chi
1986	Riptide	"The Frankie Kahana Show" (1986)	Kona
1985	Hunter	"Night of the Dragons" (1985)	Mongol, Lead Henchman
1985	Falcon Crest	"...And The Fall" (1985), "The Decline" (1985), "Devil's Harvest" (1985)	Chao-Li's Cousin #2
1985	Magnum P.I.	"The Love-for-Sale Boat" (1985)	Yaikra
1983	Manimal	"Breath of the Dragon" (1983)	Tang
1982	Bring 'Em Back Alive	"Wilmer Bass and the Serengeti Kid" (1982)	Magar
1981	The Misadventures of Sheriff Lobo	"The Roller Disco Karate Kaper" (1981)	Kahuna
1981	M*A*S*H	"No Laughing Matter" (1981)	Korean Man
1978	CHiPs	"Disaster Squad" (1978)	Wrong-Way Driver
1978	The Hardy Boys/Nancy Drew Mysteries	"Death Surf" (1978)	Cho-Lin
1976	Starsky and Hutch	"Nightlight" (1976)	"Itchy"
1975	Joe Forrester	"The Witness" (1975)	Henchman
1974	General Hospital	Various Episodes in 1974	Won Chu
1974	Sanford and Son	"Home Sweet Home" (1974)	Saburyo
1974	Kung Fu	"Arrogant Dragon" (1974)	The Dark Rider (opposite David Carradine)
1969	Here Come the Brides	"Marriage, Chinese Style" (1969)	Tong Enforcer (opposite Bruce Lee)
1969	Star Trek: The Original Series	S3:E22, "The Savage Curtain" (1969)	Genghis Khan (opposite William Shatner and Leonard Nimoy)
