= John Meagher =

John Meagher may refer to:

- John Meagher, Irish architect, partner in De Blacam & Meagher
- John Meagher (Canada East politician) (1805–1876), merchant and politician in Canada East
- John Paul Meagher (born 1939), developer and political figure in Saskatchewan, Canada
- John Meagher (Australian politician) (1837–1920), member of the New South Wales Legislative Council
- John F. Meagher (born 1948), Australian Thoroughbred racehorse trainer
- John W. Meagher (1917–1996), United States soldier, Medal of Honor recipient
- John Meagher (hurler) (born 1995), Irish hurler

== See also ==
- Jack Meagher (1896–1968), American football coach
- Jack Meagher (Australian footballer) (born 1930), Australian rules football player
