= Robert Wu =

American actor

- Occupations: Actor, producer, writer
- Years active: 1997–present

Robert Wu is an American actor, producer and writer. He played Ming, who transforms into a version of "Ming the Merciless", the arch-enemy of Flash Gordon, (during a hallucination that Sam J. Jones, the actor who plays Flash Gordon has) in Seth MacFarlane's film, Ted (2012). He has also worked with MacFarlane on episodes of Family Guy, providing voices for several characters on the show. He also has appeared as the character Scooby/Wayne on multiple episodes of The Shield.

== Career ==
=== Film and TV work ===
In addition to Ted, Wu has appeared in the feature films Hot Tub Time Machine (as Mr. Wang), Juwan Chung's Baby (2008) (as the first Wah Ching gangster), Kung Phooey (as Lo Fat), and Phil Gorn's S.F. (as Detective Yee). He also appeared as a translator in the squad of four in Stephane Gauger's Chinatown Squad, written by Baby co-star Feodor Chin, and starring Chin as well as other Baby co-star David Huynh.

He is probably most known for his recurring role on the TV show Family Guy as Mr. Washee Washee. Survivor's Remorse he regularly appears as Chen, a Chinese shoe executive. The Shield as Scooby / Wayne. Other TV shows he has appeared on include It's Always Sunny in Philadelphia (as the Man in the episode "The Gang Gets Trapped"), Good Luck Charlie (as Tim), Criminal Minds (as Paul Jones), The Defenders (as ADA Gow), Rubicon (as Chair Bumper Guy), The Good Guys (as Lee Huang), Bones (as James Sok), 7th Heaven (as Doctor Thomas Quawn), George Lopez (as Andrew), Threshold (as Philip Choi), Numb3rs (as Raymond Hmong), Clubhouse (as Von), Robbery Homicide Division (as Binh Joe/Bobby Poon), Boston Public (as Younger Man), Nash Bridges (as Consulate Guard) and the Chinese TV series Tou du.

=== Video game voice work ===
Wu has also provided his voice talents to videogames such as Resident Evil 6, Ace Combat: Assault Horizon, MAG, L.A. Noire, Dead to Rights: Retribution, No More Heroes 2: Desperate Struggle, X-Men Origins: Wolverine (the voice of David Nord/Agent Zero), Metal Gear Solid 4: Guns of the Patriots, GoldenEye: Rogue Agent, and Jet Li's Rise to Honor.

== Filmography ==
=== Film ===
| Year | Title | Role | Notes |
|---|---|---|---|
| 2003 | Kung Phooey | Lo Fat | |
| 2007 | Baby | Wah Ching #1 | |
| 2007 | Nanking | Li Pu | |
| 2010 | Hot Tub Time Machine | Mr. Wang | Uncredited |
| 2012 | Ted | Quan Ming / Ming the Merciless | |
| 2017 | Logan | Federale | |
| 2017 | Weird City: Street Root | Cassander Li | Short film |
| 2018 | Leverage | Trey | Short film |
| 2019 | Maternal Instinct | Dr. Lee | Television film |
| 2023 | The Monkey King | Palace Minister, Pigsly (voices) | |

=== Television ===
| Year | Title | Role | Notes |
|---|---|---|---|
| 2005 | George Lopez | Andrew | Episode: "George Says I Do... More in This Marriage" |
| 2011 | Good Luck Charlie | Tim | Episode: "Meet the Parents" |
| 2011 | Criminal Minds | Paul Jones | Episode: "With Friends Like This" |
| 2011–2020 | Family Guy | Mr. Washee Washee, Octopus, Charles Yamamoto, various voices | 21 episodes |
| 2014–2017 | Survivor's Remorse | Da Chen Bao | 22 episodes |
| 2017 | The Librarians | Sterling Lam | Episode: "And the Fatal Separation" |
| 2018 | The Big Bang Theory | Tam Nguyen | Episode: "The Tam Turbulence" |

=== Video games ===
| Year | Title | Role | Source |
|---|---|---|---|
| 2003 | Rise to Honor | Billy Soon | |
| 2004 | GoldenEye: Rogue Agent | | |
| 2008 | Metal Gear Solid 4: Guns of the Patriots | Enemy Soldiers, MGO Soldiers | |
| 2009 | X-Men Origins: Wolverine | David Nord/Agent Zero | |
| 2010 | No More Heroes 2: Desperate Struggle | Ryuji | |
| 2010 | MAG | S.V.E.R. Soldier #2 | |
| 2010 | Dead to Rights: Retribution | Triad, Security Guard | |
| 2011 | L.A. Noire | Male Pedestrian 7 | |
| 2011 | Ace Combat: Assault Horizon | Nomad 61 | |
| 2012 | The Expendables 2 Videogame | Enemy | |
| 2012 | Resident Evil 6 | Civilians | |
| 2012 | Family Guy: Back to the Multiverse | Additional Voices | |
| 2017 | LawBreakers | Feng | |
| 2019 | Death Stranding | The Novelist's Son | |
| 2025 | Ghost of Yotei | The Spider | |
