= List of Lowell High School (San Francisco) alumni =

List of notable alumni of Lowell High School, San Francisco

Notable alumni of Lowell High School, San Francisco, have been cataloged by the Lowell High Alumni Association. Alumni include:

| Name | Class year | Notability | Reference(s) |
|---|---|---|---|
| Albert Abraham Michelson | 1868 | Nobel Prize in Physics in 1907; first American Nobel laureate in a scientific field | |
| Charles Lee Tilden | 1874 | Attorney and businessman, namesake of Tilden Regional Park in the East Bay | |
| Stephen Mather | 1883 | First director of the National Park Service | |
| William Renwick Smedberg Jr. | 1888 | U.S. Army brigadier general | |
| John F. Madden | 1890 | U.S. Army brigadier general | |
| Joseph Erlanger | 1892 | Physician; professor, Washington University in St. Louis; Nobel Prize in Medicine, 1945 | |
| Eugene Meyer | 1892 | First president of the World Bank; chairman of the Federal Reserve Bank | |
| G. Albert Lansburgh | 1894 | Architect of Broadway and Los Angeles theatres and cinemas | |
| Wesley Newcomb Hohfeld | 1897 | Legal theorist and law professor at Yale and Stanford | |
| Rube Goldberg | 1900 | Pulitzer Prize winner, creator of "Rube Goldberg" machines | |
| Walter A. Haas | 1905 | Board chairman, Levi Strauss & Co; namesake of Haas School of Business at UC Berkeley | |
| Newton B. Drury | 1908 | Fourth director of the National Park Service | |
| Alexander Calder | 1915 | Artist and inventor of the mobile | |
| Gerald M. Loeb | | Founding partner of E.F. Hutton & Co. | |
| Cyril Magnin | 1918 | Chief executive of the Joseph Magnin Co. | |
| Edmund G. "Pat" Brown Sr. | 1923 | District attorney of San Francisco; state attorney general; governor of California, 1959–1967 | |
| Larry Rhine | 1927 | Producer and screenwriter | |
| Robert Lees | 1929 | Film and television writer | |
| William Hewlett | 1930 | Inventor, businessman, philanthropist; co-founder, Hewlett-Packard Company; William and Flora Hewlett Foundation | |
| Alex Eagle | | NFL player | |
| Charles Ginsburg | 1936 | Developed first commercially viable videotape recorder at Ampex | |
| Stafford Repp | 1936 | Actor, Batman television series | |
| Carol Channing | 1938 | Tony Award-winning singer, actress and comedian | |
| Richard Diebenkorn | 1939 | Painter | |
| William G. Joslyn | 1940 | Marine Corps major general; drafted by Washington Redskins in 1944 | |
| William Coblentz | | California power broker, Lawyer, UC regent | |
| Pierre Salinger | 1941 | Press secretary to US President John F. Kennedy; United States senator from California | |
| Art Hoppe | 1942 | Popular columnist for the San Francisco Chronicle for more than 40 years | |
| Jerry Coleman | 1942 | Decorated Marine aviator, New York Yankee, Hall of Fame announcer | |
| Kenneth McLennan | 1943 | Marine Corps four-star general, assistant commandant of the Marine Corps | |
| Harry Likas | 1943 | NCAA Men's Tennis Championship in Singles in 1948 (as a member of the University of San Francisco Dons); Collegiate Tennis Hall of Famer | |
| Frank Kudelka | | NBA player | |
| Allen Newell | 1945 | Pioneer in artificial intelligence, the psychology of human cognition, and list processing | |
| Donald Fisher | 1946 | Founder and board chairman of The Gap | |
| Jann Darlyn | 1947 | Actress and model | |
| William Ware Theiss | 1948 | Academy Award-nominated costume designer for movies and TV, including Star Trek | |
| Dian Fossey | 1949 | Primatologist and conservationist known for extensive study of the mountain gorillas in Rwanda; subject of the book and film Gorillas in the Mist | |
| Ed Mayer | 1950 | Major League Baseball player for the Chicago Cubs | |
| Warren Hellman | 1951 | Private equity investor and co-founder of Hellman & Friedman | |
| Bill Bixby | 1952 | Movie and TV actor: The Incredible Hulk, My Favorite Martian, The Courtship of Eddie's Father, and film director | |
| John L. Heilbron | | Historian of science | |
| Richard C. Blum | 1953 | Husband of Dianne Feinstein; chairman and president of Blum Capital; regent of the University of California | |
| Stephen Breyer | 1955 | Associate justice of the United States Supreme Court | |
| Tom Meschery | 1957 | Played in the NBA for the Warriors and SuperSonics, 1961–1971 | |
| Charles R. Breyer | 1959 | Senior United States district judge for the United States District Court for the Northern District of California | |
| Howard Lachtman | 1959 | Literary critic | |
| Susie Tompkins Buell | 1960 | Entrepreneur and liberal political donor associated with the Democracy Alliance | |
| Julia Chang Bloch | 1960 | U.S. ambassador to Nepal | |
| Steve Silver | 1962 | Creator of Beach Blanket Babylon | |
| Eric Albronda | 1963 | Founding member of the band Blue Cheer, often considered to be the first heavy metal band | |
| Richard Levin | 1964 | President of Yale University 1993–2013 | |
| Kristina Hooper Woolsey | 1965 | Founder of the Apple Multimedia Lab | |
| Dennis Marcellino | 1965 | Member of Sly & The Family Stone, the Elvin Bishop Group, Rubicon, and the Tokens ("The Lion Sleeps Tonight") | |
| Michael Bortin | 1966 | Member of the Symbionese Liberation Army | |
| Stephen Suleyman Schwartz | 1966 | Journalist and author | |
| Linda Tillery | 1966 | Singer, percussionist, music arranger, record producer; founder of the Cultural Heritage Choir | |
| Edison Liu | | CEO of The Jackson Laboratory | |
| Charles H. Ferguson | 1972 | Software entrepreneur; writer; filmmaker; Inside Job won 2011 best documentary Academy Award | |
| John Roos | 1973 | Attorney; U.S. ambassador to Japan | |
| Larry Baer | 1975 | President of the San Francisco Giants MLB team | |
| Stefan Wever | 1976 | Major League Baseball Player for New York Yankees | |
| John D. Trasviña | 1976 | President of MALDEF, HUD assistant secretary of Fair Housing and Equal Opportunity | |
| Gill Byrd | 1978 | Played in the NFL for the San Diego Chargers, 1983–1992 | |
| Eric Allin Cornell | 1980 | Nobel Prize in Physics in 2001 | |
| Jennifer Egan | 1980 | Novelist and short story writer | |
| Soji Kashiwagi | 1980 | Playwright, executive producer for Grateful Crane Ensemble theatre organization | |
| Naomi Wolf | 1980 | Rhodes Scholar, writer | |
| Benjamin Bratt | 1982 | Movie and TV personality who starred in the television series Law & Order | |
| Paris | 1985 | Hip-hop artist | |
| Paul Miyamoto | 1985 | Sheriff of the City and County of San Francisco | |
| Margaret Cho | 1986 | Comedian, briefly attended Lowell before transferring to Ruth Asawa San Francisco School of the Arts | |
| Lisa Bielawa | | Composer and vocalist | |
| Daniel Handler | 1988 | Aka Lemony Snicket, bestselling author of a series of children's novels: A Series of Unfortunate Events, and a novel set in a fictional Lowell High School, The Basic Eight | |
| Alex Tse | 1994 | Screenwriter of Sucker Free City (2004) and Watchmen (2009) | |
| Raina Telgemeier | 1995 | Cartoonist and author | |
| Adrian Lamo | | Computer hacker, key figure in WikiLeaks case, and journalist who attended Lowell along with two other high schools | |
| Katrina Lake | | Founder and former CEO of Stitch Fix | |
| Dario Amodei | 2001 | CEO and co-founder of the artificial intelligence company Anthropic | |
| Jamie Chung | 2001 | Reality television personality who gained fame on The Real World: San Diego; actress, films Sorority Row and The Hangover Part II and TV series Once Upon a Time | |
| Anton Peterlin | 2005 | Soccer player | |
| Daniela Amodei | 2006 | President and co-founder of the artificial intelligence company Anthropic | |
| Rita Volk | 2008 | Model and actress; star of Faking It | |
| Lolo Zouaï | 2013 | Singer, songwriter, producer and model | |
| 24kGoldn | 2018 | Hip hop musician | |
