= Sophie Oda =

American actress

- Born: October 23, 1991 (age 34); San Francisco, California, U.S.
- Occupations: Actress, singer, voice actress
- Years active: 2003–present

Sophie Oda (born October 23, 1991) is an American actress and singer. She was nominated in 2007 by the Young Artist Awards as a guest starring young actress.

== Personal life ==
Oda, a Japanese American, performed in Asian Americans on Broadway, Multi-Media Musicals, East West Players Anniversary, MADD, Bay Area Kid Fest. She is a featured singer on the CD, Kabaret for Kids.

Oda has been performing in professional theatre since the age of six. Shows include The 25th Annual Putnam County Spelling Bee, the world premiere of A Little Princess, the West Coast premiere of Jane Eyre: the Musical, The Sound of Music, Pacific Overtures, Annie, The Joy Luck Club, A Midsummer Night's Dream, South Pacific, The King and I and more.

Oda graduated from the University of California, Irvine in 2012 with a B.F.A in Musical Theatre.

== Career ==
Oda had a recurring role in The Suite Life of Zack & Cody as Barbara Brownstein. She appeared in two movies: Bee Season and Kung Phooey. Oda has been a singer on Star Search. She has been a guest star in the latest sitcom, The Suite Life on Deck, with her recurring role as Barbara. Oda is starring in a comedy web series called Spaz Fu.

== Filmography ==
Year	Title	Role	Notes
2003	Star Search	Jr. Singer Contestant	Credited as Sophie Tamiko Oda
2003	Kung Phooey!	Young Helen	
2005	Bee Season	"Usurper" Speller	Credited as Sophie Tamiko Oda
2005–2008	The Suite Life of Zack & Cody	Barbara Brownstein	10 episodes
2008	The Suite Life on Deck	Barbara Brownstein	1 episode
2013	DC Nation Shorts	Amethyst	Voice only
2014	The Big Bang Theory	Grace	1 episode
2014	NCIS: Los Angeles		1 episode
2017	Brooklyn Nine-Nine	Chiaki	Episode: Kicks
2019	Hawaii Five-0	Julia Wahea	Episode: A'ohe pau ka 'ike i ka halau ho'okahi

== Awards and nominations ==
Year	Award	Category	Result
2007	Young Artist Awards	Guest starring young actress	Nominated
