= Zenyatta (disambiguation) =

Zenyatta is a champion racehorse. The word in other contexts may refer to:

- Zenyatta (Overwatch), character in the 2016 video game
- Zenyatta Mondatta, the album by The Police that was the inspiration for the name of the horse
