= Baby (2007 film) =

- Directed by: Juwan Chung
- Written by: Felix Chan; Juwan Chung
- Produced by: Jason Serrato
- Starring: David Huynh; Tzi Ma; Ron Yuan; Kenneth Choi; Feodor Chin
- Cinematography: Johnny Ching
- Music by: Rob Blu
- Production company: Xenon
- Distributed by: Lionsgate
- Release dates: May 2007 (Los Angeles Asian Pacific Film Festival); December 30, 2008 (United States)
- Country: United States
- Language: English

Baby is a 2007 independent film directed by Juwan Chung and starring David Huynh, Tzi Ma, Feodor Chin, Ron Yuan and Kenneth Choi. Considered part of the hood film genre, the film tells the story of an Asian-American youth's gang life in East Los Angeles, set during the mid-1980s to the early 1990s. It has been called "the Asian American Boyz n the Hood" by the San Francisco Chronicle.

The film won Best Narrative Feature at the 2007 Los Angeles Asian Pacific Film Festival and a Special Jury Award for "Outstanding Newcomer" for star David Huynh at the same film festival that year, and a Best Director award for Director Juwan Chung at the 2008 DisOrient Film Festival. It was also distributed by Lionsgate.

== Synopsis ==
Baby is the tragic story of an Asian-American youth trapped in the seedy, dead-end world of hostess bars, pool halls and drug dens that characterize East Los Angeles gang life in the 1980s. Baby (Ryan Andres) is a motherless, poverty stricken 11-year-old with only an alcoholic father (Tzi Ma) to raise him.

Things only get worse when he's taken under the wing of his gangster neighbor Tommy (Ron Yuan), who leads him down a path that lands him in Juvenile Hall for manslaughter, with Benny (Feodor Chin) ostracizing Baby from the group. After seven violent years in prison, Baby (now portrayed by David Huynh) is released, but struggles to fit into a society that rejects him, and soon returns to a life of drugs, street gangs and murder.

Meanwhile, Benny has risen through the ranks to become the local Crime Boss for a side of the Wah Ching Triad. Only his childhood friends and a lost love offer him any hope of turning his life around before it's too late.

== Cast ==
Actor	Role
David Huynh	Baby
Tzi Ma	Pops
Ron Yuan	Tommy
Kenneth Choi	Mike
Feodor Chin	Benny
Kenzo Lee	Roy
Aljarreau Galang	Robbie
Meng Wei	Blackfish
Peter Cho	Fat Petey
Christina Stacey	Sammy
Janet Linn (as Linn Ko)	Arianna
Ryan Andres	Young Baby
Roshon Fegan	Young Robbie
Matthew Der	Young Blackfish
Austin Lee	Young Fat Petey
Shannon Yang	Young Sammy
Nathan Jung	Restaurant Guy
Robert Wu	Wah Ching #1

== Awards ==
Year	Award	Category / Recipient	Result	Ref.
2007	DisOrient Asian American Film Festival Award	Best Director - Juwan Chung	Won	
2007	VC FilmFest Award	Best Narrative - Juwan Chung	Won	
2007	VC FilmFest Award	Best New Actor - David Huynh	Won	

== See also ==
- List of hood films
