= Vampariah =

- Directed by: Matthew Abaya
- Written by: Matthew Abaya
- Produced by: Abe Pagtama; Roberto Divina; Alan Kao; William Lee
- Starring: Kelly Lou Dennis; Aureen Almario; Hilton Jamal Day; Scott Mathison; Roberto Divina
- Cinematography: Aja Pilapil
- Edited by: Haz Madt
- Music by: Cynical Mass and Armor Rapista
- Release date: February 1, 2016
- Running time: 90 minutes
- Country: United States
- Language: English

Vampariah is a 2016 American horror film directed and written by Matthew Abaya, and produced by Abe Pagtama, Roberto Divina, Alan Kao and William Lee. It stars Kelly Lou Dennis, Aureen Almario, Arlene Boado, Scott Mathison and more. The film had its world premiere at Los Angeles Asian Pacific Film Festival (LAAPFF).

== Plot ==
Mahal (Kelly Lou Dennis) is a part of an elite squad team of skilled hunters responsible for keeping the world safe from vampires and other creatures of the night. Her mission to rid the world of this undead threat becomes compromised when her fate intertwines with an Aswang (a vampire of Philippine folklore).

== Cast ==
- Kelly Lou Dennis as Mahal
- Aureen Almario as Bampinay
- Hilton Jamal Day as Hunter HJ
- Scott Mathison as Kilmore
- Roberto Divina as Hack Daddy
- Alex Benjamin as Kouji
- Gabi Dayers as Young Mahal
- Arlene Joie Deleon as Michele Kilman
- Michael Dorado as Detective Dorado

== Awards ==
- Best Visual Effects for a Feature Narrative Film in the Los Angeles Asian Pacific Film Festival 2016
- Best Local Feature Film - Another Hole in the Head Film Festival 2016
