= Bang Bang (2011 film) =

- Film poster
- Directed by: Byron Q
- Written by: Byron Q
- Produced by: Byron Q James Bak; Mark Battaglia
- Starring: Thai Ngo; David Huynh; Jessika Van
- Cinematography: Jeff Siljenberg
- Music by: Alexis Grapsas
- Release date: May 3, 2011 (LAAPFF)
- Country: United States
- Language: English

Bang Bang is a 2011 American gangster film directed and written by Byron Q. It stars Thai Ngo, David Huynh, Jessika Van, Wally Randolph, Vanna Fut, Kitty Chu and others. It premiered at the 2011 Los Angeles Asian Pacific Film Festival from Visual Communications, where it won the Best First Feature Award. It has also been commented to be influenced by the French New Wave films, as Director Jean-Pierre Gorin was a teacher of the film's director Byron Q while at UCSD.

== Plot ==
A story about a youth named Justin (Thai Ngo) who grows up on the streets of San Diego, and who dreams of becoming a rapper. Meanwhile, he befriends a parachute kid Taiwanese gangster named Charlie (David Huynh) and deals with other gang leaders such as Rocky (Wally Randolph or Walter Wong).

== Production ==
The film was shot in San Diego.

== Release ==
The film screened October 21, 2011 at the San Diego Asian Film Festival.

== Reception ==
=== Awards ===
- Best First Feature, 2011 Los Angeles Asian Pacific Film Festival

=== Nominations ===
- Hollywood Music in Media Awards (HMMA), Alexis Grapsas
- Jury Award, Best Narrative Feature Film, 2012 San Francisco International Asian American Film Festival (now CAAMFest)

=== Critical response ===
Carlos Cajilig at Hyphen Magazine said the film has "too many elements" but "is a serious and unflinching look at a side of Asian America that rarely gets portrayed in film."
