= Linda Mabalot =

- Born: September 4, 1953; Fairfield, California
- Died: May 19, 2003 (aged 49); Los Angeles, California
- Education: University of California, Davis, 1975
- Occupations: Filmmaker, activist
- Years active: 1977-2003

Linda Mabalot (September 4, 1953 - May 19, 2003) was a Filipino American filmmaker and community activist who founded the Los Angeles Asian Pacific Film Festival, also known as the Asian Pacific Film and Video Festival or VC FilmFest. She was the former executive director of Visual Communications, a nonprofit media production organization "dedicated to the honest and accurate portrayals of the Asian Pacific American peoples, communities, and heritage through the media arts" according to their mission.

== Early life ==
Mabalot was born in Fairfield, California, and grew up in Liberty Island, a town in the Sacramento River Delta. Mabalot spent most of her youth helping her father, a first generation Filipino American, with work on land that he leased.

== Career ==
Mabalot attended Dixon High School and later graduated from the University of California, Davis in 1975 with a degree in biology. In college, she participated in the activities of the Asian Pacific American student movement. She was inspired by the works of Filipino American writer Carlos Bulosan, and her hope to make a film about him encouraged her to pursue a career in filmmaking.

While walking in Little Tokyo one day in 1977, Mabalot met Duane Kubo and Eddie Wong, two of the founding members of Visual Communications. She joined their collective beginning in 1977 to produce and direct a documentary on the history of Filipinos and Filipino Americans in California. The result, Manong (1977), was one of the first documentaries about Filipino Americans, and it documented the history of Filipino farm workers in the Central Valley in California as well as the United Farm Workers movement and Philip Veracruz's involvement in it.

She produced, directed, and contributed to many projects focusing on Asian American experiences, including Manong (1977), Planting Roots: A Pictorial History of Filipinos in California (1981), and Hiroshima 20 Years Later (1996). She also contributed to publications like Imaging: A Century of Asian Women in Film.

Throughout the early 1980's, Visual Communications faced bankruptcy and a significant loss of staff. Mabalot and Nancy Araki, a Japanese American staffer at Visual Communications and the later Director of Community Affairs at the Japanese American National Museum, worked to restructure the organization and save it from its financial issues. Mabalot and Araki succeeded in pulling Visual Communications out of debt by developing a new structure which included requiring the monetization of Visual Communications' resources, such as using the photographic dark room, and focusing on smaller scale projects given that larger projects had put the organization in debt in the first place.

Mabalot became executive director of Visual Communications in 1985.

Between 1992 and 1995, Mabalot was the Co-President for the National Alliance for Media Arts and Culture. She co-founded the Festival of Philippine Arts and Culture, the National Coalition for Multicultural Media Arts, and the Asian Pacific American Network.

In 1998, she organized and oversaw a photo exhibit for the California Sesquicentennial Commission of the California State Library, "Heading East: California's Asian Pacific Experience."

Mabalot is the recipient of awards from the Asian Business League, the Steve Tatsukawa Memorial Fund, and a 1988 Vesta Award in Media Arts, Women's Building.

== Legacy ==
Mabalot was known for encouraging the support of young, up and coming Asian Pacific American filmmakers at the start of their careers. She helped filmmakers including Taiwanese American director Justin Lin, who is known for directing Better Luck Tomorrow (2002) and a number of the Fast and Furious franchise films. Mabalot allowed Lin to use the Visual Communications' offices for a film on the Asian American model minority myth, and she supported him in the earlier days of his media career. According to Lin, “When Linda read the script, she really got it. She helped to empower me as an artist to explore the issues I wanted to explore, to stay true to the characters and issues without having to water them down or worry about what so-and-so in the community might think. What she brought was unconditional support.” Mabalot's philosophy influenced the overall mission of Visual Communications as the organization shifted from producing its own material to additionally sponsoring and advocating for other Asian Pacific American filmmakers. Mabalot also mentored filmmakers including Gene Cajayon, Eric Byler, and Rod Pulido.

In 1983, Visual Communications, under the leadership of Mabalot, founded the Los Angeles Asian Pacific Film Festival which promotes Asian Pacific American and Asian international cinema. Held annually, it is one of the largest festivals in the United States to showcase films by and about Asians and Asian Pacific Americans.

The Linda Mabalot Papers are held at the Bulosan Center for Filipino Studies in the Welga Digital Archive.

== Death ==
On May 19, 2003, Mabalot passed at the age of 49 at the West Hills Medical Center from cancer.

== Filmography and Television ==
- Manong (1977)
- Planting Roots: A Pictorial History of Filipinos in California (1981)
- Moving the Image (1992,1993,1995,1996) for International Channel Network
- Hiroshima 20 Years Later (1996)

== Publications ==
- Moving the Image: 20 Years of Independent Asian Pacific Media Arts (1990)
- Imaging: A Century of Asian Women in Film (1998)

== Awards ==
- Steve Tatsukawa Memorial Fund
- Vesta Award in Media Arts, Women's Building
