= Kung Phooey =

2003 independent film

Kung Phooey!
- Directed by: Darryl Fong
- Written by: Darryl Fong
- Starring: Michael Chow Man-Kin; Joyce Thi Brew; Wallace Choy; Karena Davis; Colman Domingo; Darryl Fong; Fred Salvallon; Robert Wu; Stuart W. Yee
- Edited by: Rick LeCompte; Steve S. Liu
- Music by: Ryan Kallas; Kent Carter
- Distributed by: Velocity Entertainment; Thinkfilm
- Release date: March 11, 2003
- Running time: 87 minutes
- Language: English

Kung Phooey! is a 2003 independent film directed and produced by Darryl Fong. Fong also co-stars in the movie, alongside Michael Chow and Colman Domingo. The movie is about a monk who tries to find a mysterious lost "Fountain of Youth" (an ancient magic peach). He travels to British Columbia, and, with a new band of friends, tries to retrieve the stolen artifact.

The movie is an affectionate parody of old Kung fu film tropes. For instance, one of the running jokes is about how all the bad guys make "Hi-yah!" sounds. The filming actually took place in the San Francisco Bay Area, poking fun at movies like Rumble in the Bronx that disguise British Columbia locations to look like cities in the United States.

== Plot ==
The plot follows the quest of Art Chew (Michael Chow) (Note: The name of the character Art Chew is a pun of the sneezing sound.) to retrieve the ancient peach. The movie starts with Art Chew traveling to America, after briefly showing Art's training at the Shur-li temple, (Note: Shur-li Temple is a pun of the famous child actor Shirley Temple) showing many kung-fu clichés such as grabbing the pebble from the master's hand (at which Art succeeds without effort), fighting on trees (in this case small potted palms) and "listing" for elements (Earth, Wind & Fire play a funky tune). After the montage is shown, Art meets up with his cousin Wayman (Darryl Fong), (Note: "Wayman" parodies the way some Chinese pronounce r as w.) a Chinese adult who tries to act American so he isn't embarrassed by stereotypes, and foster cousin Roy Lee (Colman Domingo), an African American who sincerely believes he is a reincarnation of Bruce Lee.

Not long after Art arrives, Helen Hu (Joyce Thi Brew), a dealer of Monosodium glutamate (MSG) portrayed with unscrupulous motivations like a cocaine dealer, forces Art's stereotypical Uncle Wong (Wallace Choy) into buying more MSG. Art intervenes and tries to fight Helen's muscle, the overweight and strong One Ton (perhaps a play on the Chinese wonton), the wise cracking "brains" of the outfit Lo Fat, and the Kung-Fu fighter Non Fat. After blocking One Ton's attack, Art reels to attack showing a smiley face on his arm which Lo Fat points out as a symbol of a Shur-li monk and they run away.

Art asks his uncle where the Ancient peach is and is told that it is in the restaurant owned by Helen Hu; in a brief humorous spectacle, Art and the others mix the name Hu with the article "who". (Note: This is in homage to the Who's on First? comedy routine.) Art's uncle had sold the restaurant to Hu a few years ago. Art, Wayman and Roy Lee go to Helen's restaurant and are taken to her by a waiter that is badly dubbed because "This is how all Hong Kong actors talk". Helen claims to know nothing about the peach and gets One Ton to escort Art and his friends to leave. On the way out, Roy Lee tries to kick Non Fat but misses and breaks a hole in the wall.

After Art and crew are thrown out Lo Fat notices a glowing coming out of the hole in the wall and looks in and finds the ancient peach. Subsequent events include the peach changing hands multiple times and the appearance of a romantic interest, Sue Shi (Karena Davis), (Note: Sue Shi's name is a pun on sushi.) who is later revealed to be an agent of the Shur-li temple.

== Production ==
Kung Phooey! was primarily filmed in Oakland and San Francisco, starting in spring 2001. Filming locations included Oakland Chinatown and Golden Gate Park.

Fong said he was motivated to create the film after he was continually cast into stereotypical "Asian American" roles: "I was an actor, disgusted with the opportunities for Asian actors. There were no really great parts." Fran Kuzui had signed to direct the project, but she said the film could not be sold without casting more Caucasian actors, so Fong made the film independently.

== Release ==
Kung Phooey! received a limited release at film festivals focusing on Asian American and independent cinema (VC Filmfest, San Francisco Asian American Film Festival, WorldFest Houston, San Diego Asian Film Festival) starting in early May 2003.

The film was released on DVD and VHS in July 2004.

== Reception ==
Robert Koehler, reviewing for Variety, called it "scrappy foolishness" and noted the "visual jokes pile up like the bad guys but never at the kind of crackling pace this brand of spoof demands" while comparing it to Fear of a Black Hat.

== See also ==
- Hong Kong Phooey (1976)
- Kung Pow! Enter the Fist (2002), a contemporary kung fu film parody
- The Foot Fist Way (2006)
