= John W. Meagher =

John William Meagher
- Born: December 5, 1917; Jersey City, New Jersey, US
- Died: April 14, 1996 (aged 78)
- Burial place: Arlington National Cemetery
- Military career
- Allegiance: United States of America
- Branch: United States Army
- Rank: Technical Sergeant
- Units: 2nd Battalion, 305th Infantry Regiment, 77th Infantry Division
- Conflicts: World War II: Battle of Okinawa
- Awards: Medal of Honor

John William Meagher (December 5, 1917 – April 14, 1996) was a United States Army soldier and a recipient of the United States military's highest decoration—the Medal of Honor—for his actions during the Battle of Okinawa in World War II.

Meagher joined the Army from his birthplace of Jersey City, New Jersey, and by June 19, 1945, was serving as a technical sergeant in Company E, 305th Infantry Regiment, 77th Infantry Division. On that day, near Ōzato, Okinawa, he prevented the tank he was riding on from being disabled by an enemy soldier and then single-handedly destroyed two enemy positions. For his actions, he was awarded the Medal of Honor one year later, on June 26, 1946.

Meagher left the Army while still a technical sergeant. He died at age 78 and was buried in Arlington National Cemetery. He is survived by his wife and two daughters. His eldest son John W. Meagher died in 2008.

== Medal of Honor citation ==
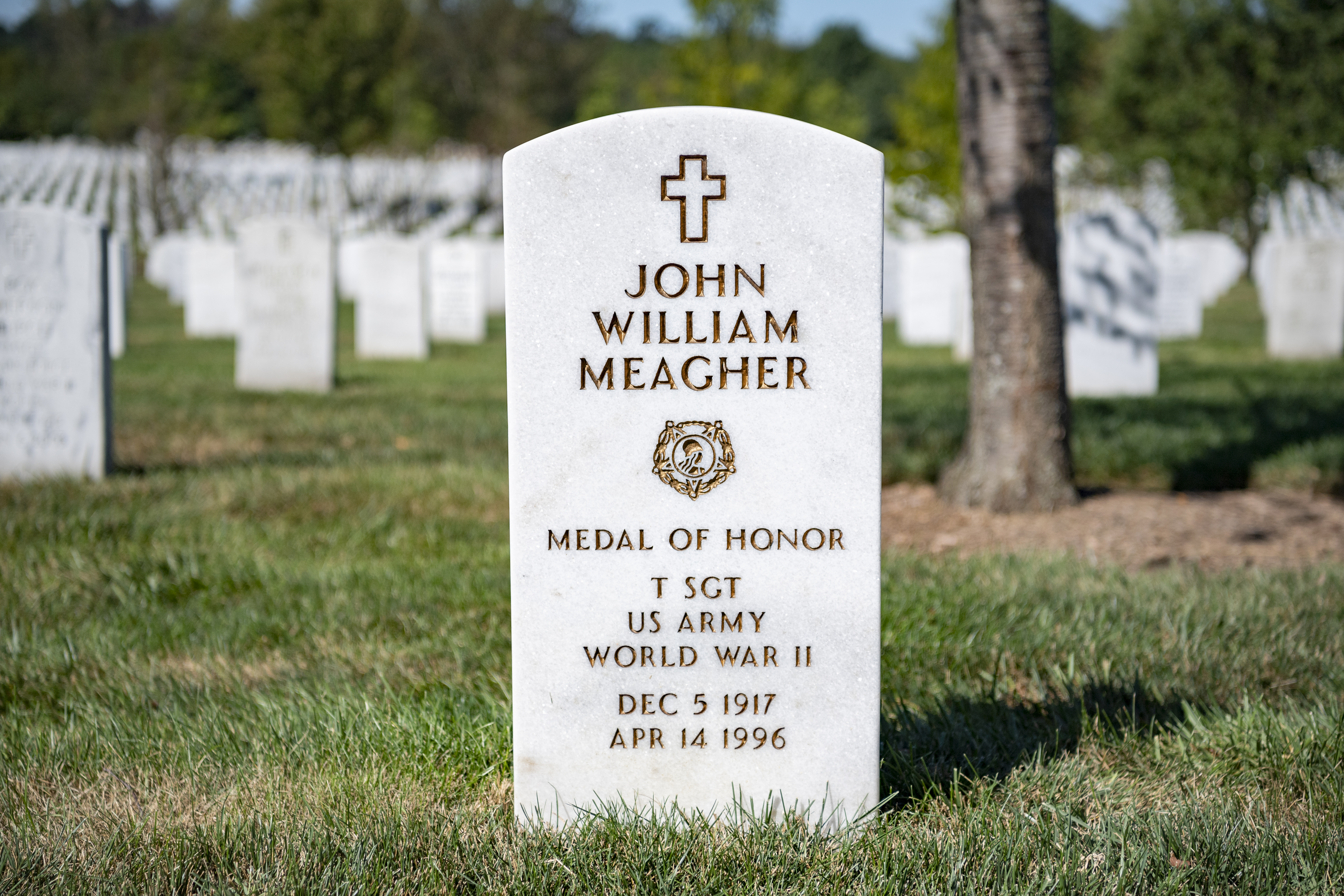
Meagher's grave at Arlington National Cemetery

Technical Sergeant Meagher's official Medal of Honor citation reads as follows:

He displayed conspicuous gallantry and intrepidity above and beyond the call of duty. In the heat of the fight, he mounted an assault tank, and, with bullets splattering about him, designated targets to the gunner. Seeing an enemy soldier carrying an explosive charge dash for the tank treads, he shouted fire orders to the gunner, leaped from the tank, and bayoneted the charging soldier. Knocked unconscious and his rifle destroyed, he regained consciousness, secured a machinegun from the tank, and began a furious 1-man assault on the enemy. Firing from his hip, moving through vicious crossfire that ripped through his clothing, he charged the nearest pillbox, killing 6. Going on amid the hail of bullets and grenades, he dashed for a second enemy gun, running out of ammunition just as he reached the position. He grasped his empty gun by the barrel and in a violent onslaught killed the crew. By his fearless assaults T/Sgt. Meagher single-handedly broke the enemy resistance, enabling his platoon to take its objective and continue the advance.

== Awards and decorations ==

Badge	Combat Infantryman Badge		
1st row	Medal of Honor		
2nd row	Bronze Star Medal with 1 Oak leaf cluster	Army Good Conduct Medal	American Campaign Medal
3rd row	Asiatic-Pacific Campaign Medal with 3 Campaign stars	World War II Victory Medal	Philippine Liberation Medal

== See also ==
- List of Medal of Honor recipients
