= 177th Armored Brigade =

- 177th Armored Brigade shoulder sleeve insignia
- Active: 5 August 1917–1 June 1919 (National Army); 24 June 1921–3 March 1945 (various designations); 16 October 1991–15 October 1994 (177th Armored Bge.); 24 October 1997–16 October 1999; 1 December 2006 – present
- Country: United States
- Branch: United States Army
- Role: Training
- Size: Brigade
- Part of: 85th Support Command
- Garrison/HQ: Camp Shelby
- Decorations: Army Superior Unit Award
- Battle honours: World War I; St. Mihiel; Meuse-Argonne; Lorraine 1918

Insignia
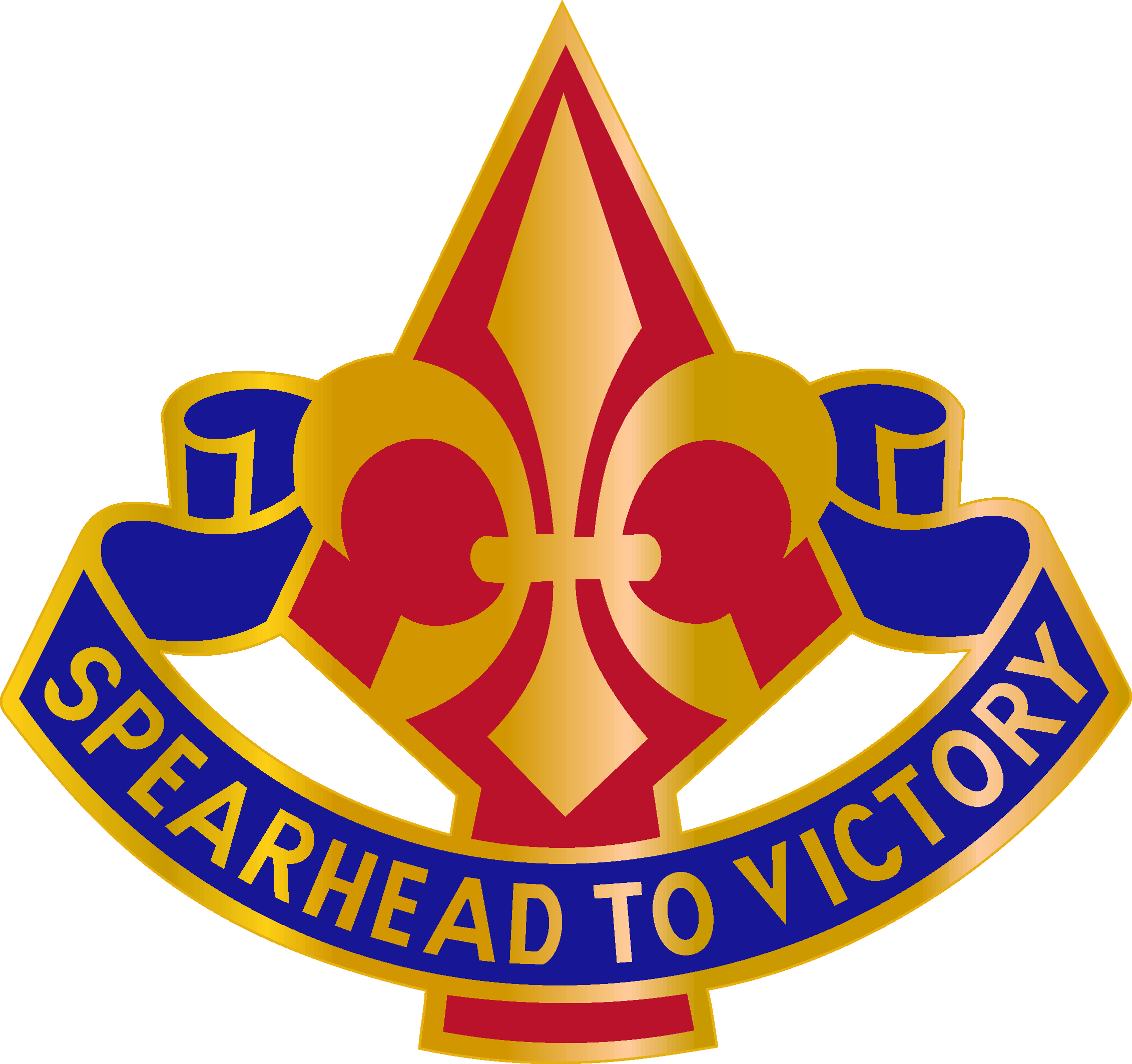
- Distinctive Unit Insignia

- Designated but not authorized shoulder sleeve insignia

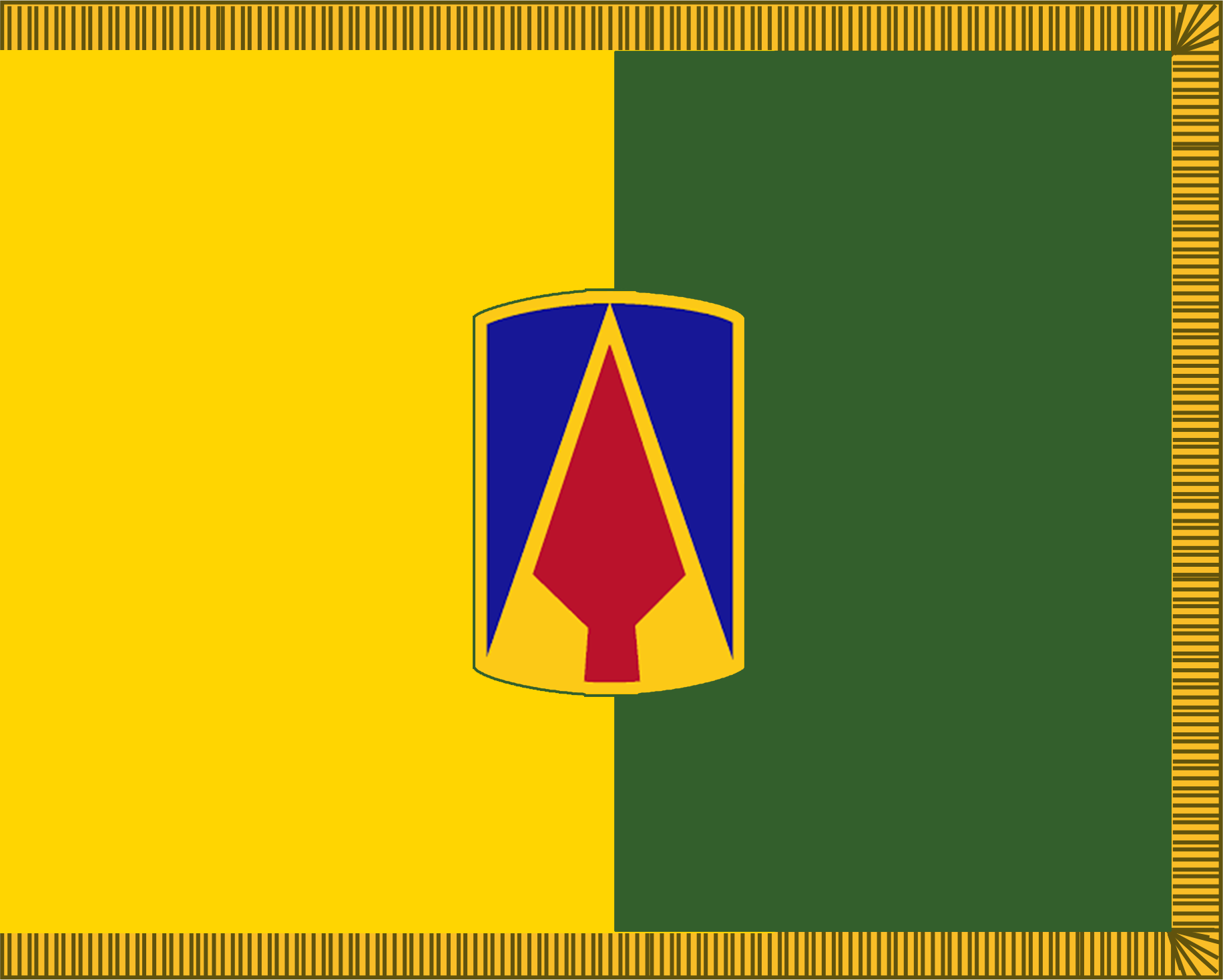
- 177th Armored Brigade Flag

The 177th Armored Brigade is an AC/RC unit based at Camp Shelby, Mississippi. The unit is responsible for training selected United States Army Reserve and National Guard units. The unit was formerly designated as 3rd Brigade, 87th Division. The brigade is a subordinate unit of First Army.

The brigade has been re-designated and re-missioned several times:

- During the World War I, the Brigade was infantry and fought as part of the 89th Infantry Division.
- In 1986, the Brigade assumed the mission as the Opposing Force (OPFOR) at the National Training Center (NTC) at Fort Irwin, California. The Brigade consisted of 2 battalions: 6th Battalion, 31st Infantry (6–31 IN) and 1st Battalion, 73rd Armor (1–73 AR). On the NTC battlefield, the 177th portrayed the fictitious, Guards 60th Motorized Rifle Division, which was based upon Soviet Army structure and doctrine.
- In 1988 the Brigade re-designated several units and activated others. 6–31 IN became 1–52 IN, 1–73 AR became 1–63 AR. Activated were the 177th Support Battalion, 177th Military Intelligence Company, 164th Chemical Company and the 87th Engineer Company.
- On 26 October 1994, as part of the post-Cold War draw down, the Brigade was inactivated and re-flagged as the 11th Armored Cavalry Regiment.
- Reactivated 24 October 1997 at Camp Shelby, Mississippi as an Army Reserve training unit and inactivated on 16 October 1999 and reflagged as 3rd Brigade, 87th Division (Training)
- On 1 December 2006 the 177th was reactivated at Camp Shelby, Mississippi under 1st Army-East.

== Organization ==
=== Organization 1917–1919 ===
- Headquarters, 177th Brigade
- 353rd Infantry Regiment
- 354th Infantry Regiment
- 341st Machine Gun Battalion

=== Organization 1942–1943 ===
- 89th Reconnaissance Troop, 89th Division

=== Organization 1943–1944 ===
- Troop A, 4th Reconnaissance Squadron

=== Organization 1944–1945 ===
- Troop A, 34th Cavalry Reconnaissance Squadron, Mechanized

=== Organization 1986–1988 ===
- HHC, 177th Armored Brigade
- 6th Battalion, 31st Infantry
- 1st Battalion, 73d Armor

=== Organization 1988–1994 ===
- HHC, 177th Armored Brigade
- 1st Battalion, 52d Infantry
- 1st Battalion, 63d Armor
- 177th Support Battalion
- 87th Engineer Company
- 177th Military Intelligence Company
- 164th Chemical Company

=== Organization 2007 ===
As of 2007, the unit is composed of:

- HHC, 177th Armored Brigade
- 1st Battalion, 346th Regiment
- 2nd Battalion, 349th Regiment
- 3rd Battalion, 349th Regiment
- 2nd Battalion, 410th Field Artillery (Training Support)
- 1st Battalion, 350th Regiment
- 2nd Battalion, 350th Regiment

=== Organization 2026 ===
The 177th Armored Brigade is a Combined Arms Training Brigade (CATB) assigned to the 85th Support Command. Like all formations of the 85th Support Command, the brigade is not a combat formation, but instead trains Army Reserve and Army National Guard units preparing for deployment. As of January 2026, the brigade consists of a Headquarters and Headquarters Company, five active duty battalions, and four reserve battalions.

- 177th Armored Brigade, at Camp Shelby (MS)
  - Headquarters and Headquarters Company, at Camp Shelby (MS)
  - 1st Battalion, 305th Regiment (Infantry), at Camp Shelby (MS)
  - 2nd Battalion, 305th Regiment (Field Artillery), at Camp Shelby (MS)
  - 3rd Battalion, 315th Regiment (Brigade Engineer Battalion), at Camp Shelby (MS)
  - 2nd Battalion, 346th Regiment (Training Support), at Camp Shelby (MS)
  - 3rd Battalion, 347th Regiment (Training Support), in Orlando (FL)
  - 3rd Battalion, 348th Regiment (Training Support), at Camp Blanding (FL)
  - 3rd Battalion, 349th Regiment (Logistical Support), at Camp Shelby (MS)
  - 2nd Battalion, 351st Regiment (Infantry), at Camp Shelby (MS)
  - 2nd Battalion, 410th Regiment (Field Artillery), at Camp Shelby (MS)

The brigade's three training support battalions and logistical support battalion are Army Reserve formations. In 2018, the brigade's 2nd Battalion, 348th Regiment (Training Support) at Fort Buchanan in Puerto Rico was transferred to the 1st Mission Support Command's Caribbean Readiness Group.

== Campaign participation credit ==
Conflict	Streamer	Year(s)
World War I	Saint-Mihiel	1918
World War I	Meuse-Argonne	1918
World War I	Lorraine	1918

== Decorations ==
Ribbon	Award	Year	Orders
	Army Superior Unit Award	2008–2011	Permanent Orders 332-07 announcing award of the Army Superior Unit award

For further information see The Brigade, A History by John J. McGrath from the Combat Studies Institute Press, Fort Leavenworth, Kansas.
