= Tzi Ma =

Hong Kong actor

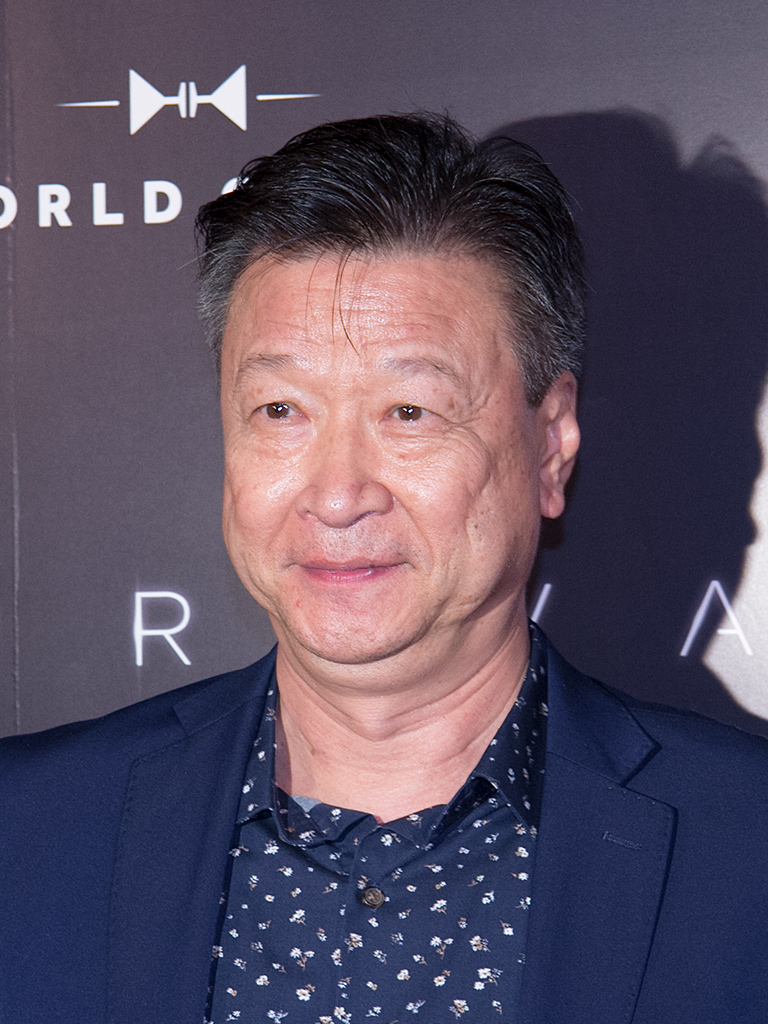
- Ma in 2016
- Born: June 10, 1962 (age 64); British Hong Kong
- Occupation: Actor
- Years active: 1979–present
- Spouse: Christina Ma (m. 1994)

Chinese name
- Traditional Chinese: 馬泰
- Simplified Chinese: 马泰
Transcriptions
Standard Mandarin
- Hanyu Pinyin: Mǎ Tài
Yue: Cantonese
- Yale Romanization: Máh Taai
- Jyutping: Maa^{5} Tai^{3}
- Website: www.tzima.com

Tzi Ma (Chinese: 馬泰; born June 10, 1962) is a Hong Kong actor. He has appeared in television shows including The Man in the High Castle and 24, and films including Dante's Peak, Rush Hour, Rush Hour 3, Arrival, The Farewell, Tigertail, and Mulan. From 2021 to 2023, he starred in the American martial arts television series Kung Fu on The CW.

== Early life and education ==
Ma was born in Hong Kong on June 10, 1962, the youngest of seven children. In 1949, Ma's father moved to Hong Kong following the Chinese Communist Revolution, and then to the United States when Ma was five years old, following political turmoil in Hong Kong. Ma grew up in New York, where his parents ran an American Chinese restaurant, Ho Wah, in Staten Island. According to Ma, immigration activist Lau Sing Kee previously operated the restaurant. Ma found his love for acting when he played Buffalo Bill in an elementary school production of Annie Get Your Gun.

== Career ==
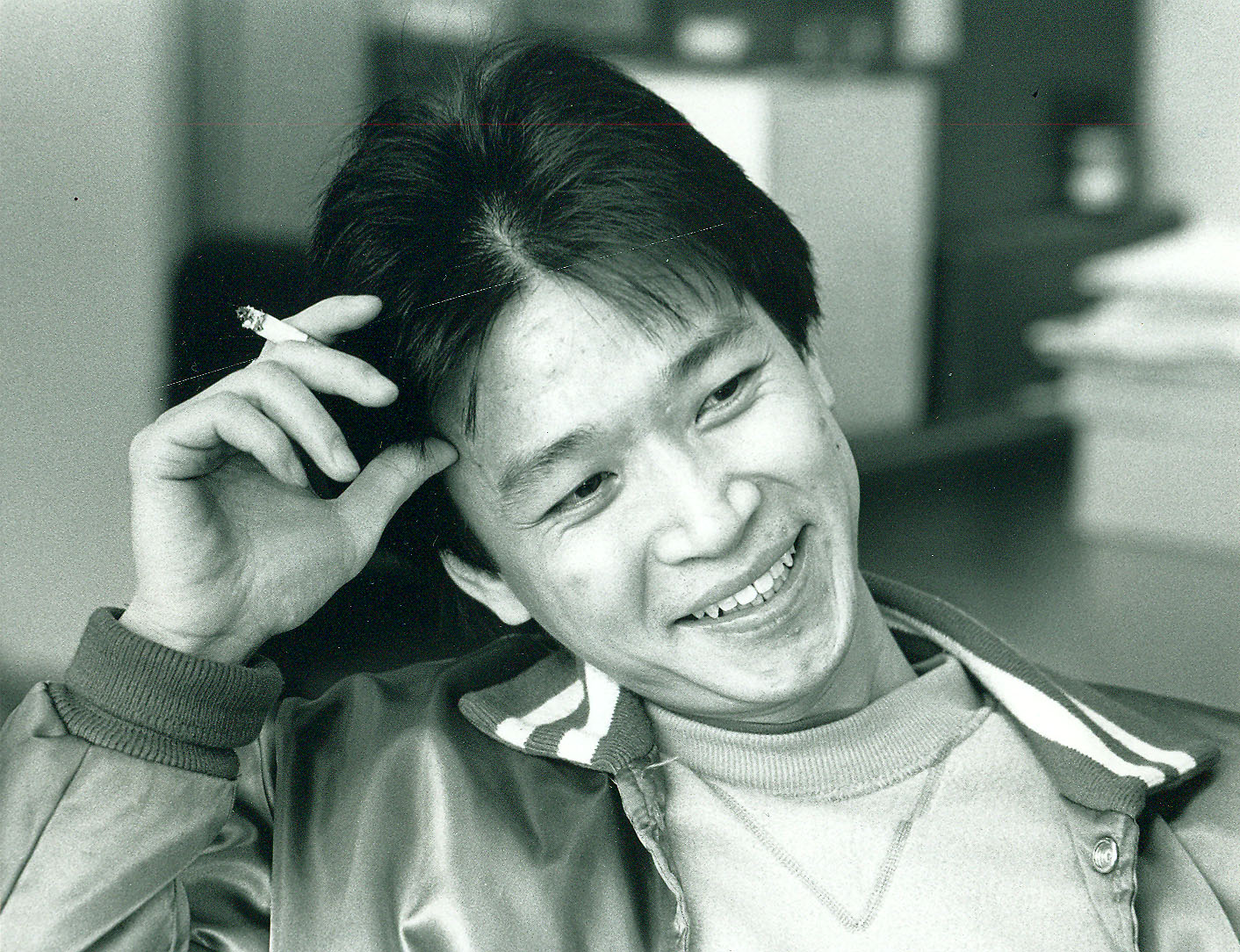
Tzi Ma in the late 1970s.

Ma has deep ties to theatre. He cites Mako's performance in Pacific Overtures in 1976 as a major influence on his acting career. He is close friends with playwright David Henry Hwang, having collaborated with him on several plays, such as FOB, Yellow Face, Flower Drum Song, and The Dance and the Railroad, throughout the years and starring in the film, Golden Gate (1993), which was written by Hwang. Ma started professionally acting in 1973 through experimental theater. At that time, he was in a residency at Nassau Community College studying acting and teaching movement. His first theatre performance was in 1975 at an outdoor theater in Roosevelt State Park as the Monkey King in a stage adaptation of a Beijing opera titled, Monkey King in the Yellow Stone King. He estimated that there were about 5 to 10 thousand audience members in attendance.

Ma also practiced martial arts prior to doing film work. He leveraged those skills in his film debut as Jimmy Lee in Cocaine Cowboys (1979).

During the 1988 Writers Guild of America strike, Ma found work at South Coast Repertory in Orange County playing various characters in the play, In Perpetuity Throughout the Universe. The play closed the weekend the strike ended, and by the following week, he had secured a role in the L.A. Law television series. In 1994, he was the assistant director on a stage production of Maxine Hong Kingston's The Woman Warrior by the Berkeley Repertory Theatre.

His major film roles include credits in The Quiet American, the remake of The Ladykillers, Dante's Peak, and Tigertail. Additionally, he has appeared as Consul Han in the Rush Hour series, General Shang, the commander of the Chinese military in Denis Villeneuve's Arrival (2016), and Hua Zhou in Niki Caro's Disney live-action adaptation of Mulan (2020).

Ma has appeared in numerous Asian American-produced independent films, such as Red Doors, Catfish in Black Bean Sauce (1999), Baby (2007), The Sensei (2008), and The Farewell (2019).

Ma was interviewed for The Slanted Screen (2006), a documentary directed by Jeff Adachi about the representation of Asian, primarily East Asian, men in Hollywood.

=== Television ===
Ma had a recurring role as Cheng Zhi, the head of security for the Chinese Consulate (Los Angeles), on the television series 24, first appearing in the series's fourth season and reprising the role in 24: Live Another Day. He also voiced Bàba Ling, Francine's adoptive father, in the animated TV series American Dad!

He also had a role in the first season of Martial Law as Lee "Nemesis" Hei, first major antagonist and Sammo Law's arch-nemesis.

Ma's other TV credits include guest appearances on MacGyver, Walker, Texas Ranger, Law & Order, ER, Boomtown, Commander in Chief, Chicago Hope, The Unit, Star Trek: The Next Generation, L.A. Law, NYPD Blue, Millennium, Fringe, Cold Case, NCIS: Los Angeles, Hawaii Five-0, Lie to Me, The Cosby Show, Grey's Anatomy, Agents of S.H.I.E.L.D., and Hell on Wheels. Ma also had a voice role in the video game Sleeping Dogs. He also appeared on the ABC series Once Upon a Time as "The Dragon". He also appeared as a zen master on the USA series Satisfaction.

He appeared as General Onoda in the Amazon show The Man In The High Castle and as Tao on AMC’s Hell On Wheels. In July 2018, it was announced that Ma was cast in the recurring role of Mr. Young on the Netflix series Wu Assassins.

In 2020, Ma was cast as a series regular in The CW's modern reboot of Kung Fu (1972). The show was renewed for a second season in May 2021.

== Filmography ==
=== Film ===
Year	Title	Role	Notes
1979	Cocaine Cowboys	Jimmy Lee	Film debut
1981	They All Laughed	Extra	Uncredited
1986	The Money Pit	Hwang	
1990	RoboCop 2	Tak Akita	
1992	Rapid Fire	Kinman Tau	
1993	Golden Gate	Chen Jung Song	
1995	Make a Wish, Molly	David Wong	Short film
1996	Chain Reaction	Lu Chen	
1997	Dante's Peak	Stan	
1997	Red Corner	Li Cheng	
1998	Rush Hour	Solon Han	
1999	Catfish in Black Bean Sauce	Vinh	
2002	The Quiet American	Hinh	
2004	The Ladykillers	The General	
2005	Red Doors	Ed Wong	
2006	Akeelah and the Bee	Mr. Chiu	
2007	Baby	Pops	
2007	Rush Hour 3	Solon Han	
2007	Battle in Seattle	The Governor	
2008	The Sensei	Buddhist Monk	
2008	Management	Truc Quoc	
2008	All God's Children Can Dance	Glen	
2009	Formosa Betrayed	Kuo	
2012	The Campaign	Mr. Zheng	
2013	Mad in Chinatown	Hangman	Short film
2014	A Good Man	Mr. Chen	
2014	Million Dollar Arm	Chang	
2014	Sutures	Jim	Short film
2015	Diablo	Quok Mi	
2015	Baby Steps	Mr. Lin	
2015	Pali Road	Arnold Zhang	
2016	Arrival	General Shang	
2017	Meditation Park	Bing	
2017	The Jade Pendant	Yu Hing	
2018	Skyscraper	Fire Chief Zheng	
2019	The Farewell	Haiyan Wang	
2020	Mulan	Hua Zhou	
2020	Tigertail	Pin-Jui	
2020	The Kid Detective	Mr. Chang	
2022	A Father's Son	Krang Li	Short film
2025	Gunslingers	Lin	
2025	The Chinatown Diner	Mr. Meng	
2026	Whatcha Want	Ming	

=== Television ===
Year	Title	Role	Notes
1984	The Cosby Show	Mr. Lee	Episode: "Father's Day"
1985	The Equalizer	Lin	Episode: "China Rain"
1989	L.A. Law	Ed Chang	Episode: "Victor/Victorious"
1989	Star Trek: The Next Generation	Physiologist	Episode: "Samaritan Snare"
1989	MacGyver	Wing Lee	Episode: "Children of Light"
1990	Yellowthread Street	Detective Eddie Pak	6 episodes
1990	Forbidden Nights	Li Dao	Television film
1990	Midnight Caller	Arthur Chang	Episode: "The Language Barrier"
1990	Head of the Class	Kwong	Episode: "Be My Baby... Sitter"
1993	Street Justice	Bryn To Chi	Episode: "Honor and Trust"
1994	The Adventures of Brisco County, Jr.	Chan	Episode: "And Baby Makes Three"
1996	JAG	Inspector Chang	Episode: "The Prisoner"
1994–2001	NYPD Blue	Detective Harold Ng	3 episodes
1996–2000	Nash Bridges	Jimmy Zee	3 episodes
1998–1999	Martial Law	Lee Hei	5 episodes
1998–1999	Millennium	Dr. Takashi; Capt. Youfook Law	2 episodes
2000	Chicago Hope	Mr. Wang	Episode: "Hanlon's Choice"
2000	The Pretender	Ki Mok/Chen Thon	Episode: "The Agent of Year Zero"
2000	City of Angels	Dr. Henry Lu	4 episodes
2000	Walker, Texas Ranger	General Nimh	Episode: "The General's Return"
2001	Gideon's Crossing	Dr. To	2 episodes
2002	The Bernie Mac Show	Ed	Episode: "Mac 101"
2002	ER	Liam Young	Episode: "Tell Me Where It Hurts"
2002	Boomtown	Roger Lam	Episode: "The David McNorris Show"
2002	Law & Order	Li Chen	Episode: "The Wheel"
2003	The Practice	Tang Jingyu	Episode: "Equal Justice"
2004	Jake 2.0	Nanda Sang	Episode: "Upgrade"
2004	Hawaii	Joseph Dao	Episode: "No Man Is an Island"
2005	JAG	Admiral Lutarno	Episode: "Straits of Malacca"
2005–2007	24	Cheng Zhi	13 episodes
2006	Commander in Chief	Chinese Ambassador	2 episodes
2006	The Unit	Rudolph Hatano	Episode: "200th Hour"
2006	Deadwood	Mahjong Player	Episode: "True Colors"
2007	Dragon Boys	Henry Wah	2 episodes
2007–2013	American Dad!	Bah Bah Ling	Voice role; 10 episodes
2008	Grey's Anatomy	Patterson	Episode: "All by Myself"
2009	The Beast	Kim Nam	Episode: "Bitsy Big-Boy"
2009	Dirty Sexy Money	Tsung Shien Chun	Episode: "The Bad Guy"
2009	Cold Case	Bo-Lin Chen '09	Episode: "Chinatown"
2009	Fringe	Ming Che	Episode: "Snakehead"
2009	Dollhouse	Matsu	Episode: "The Attic"
2010	NCIS: Los Angeles	Jun Lee	Episode: "Chinatown"
2010	Lie to Me	Mr. Chen	Episode: "Teacher and Pupils"
2010	The Whole Truth	Judge Garrett	Episode: "When Cougars Attack"
2011	Hawaii Five-O	Chi	Episode: "He Kane Hewa' Ole (An Innocent Man)"
2011	CHAOS	Quon	Episode: "Two Percent"
2012	Perception	Professor Arthur Wei	Episode: "Cipher"
2012	Vegas	Watanabe	Episode: "Estinto"
2013	Saving Hope	Dr. Lin	Episode: "The Face of the Giant Panda"
2013	Agents of S.H.I.E.L.D.	Agent Quan	Episode: "Girl in the Flower Dress"
2013–2016	Once Upon a Time	The Dragon	3 episodes
2014	24: Live Another Day	Cheng Zhi	3 episodes
2014	State of Affairs	Premier Chu Jian	Episode: "Half the Sky"
2014–2015	Satisfaction	Zen Master; Frank	9 episodes
2015	Hell on Wheels	Tao	6 episodes
2016	Elementary	Xi Hai Ching	Episode: "Who Is That Masked Man?"
2016	Man Seeking Woman	Master Sheng	Episode: "Eel"
2016	Stitchers	De Deshei	Episode: "The Dying Shame"
2016	Angie Tribeca	Joseph Takagi	Episode: "Miso Dead"
2016	The Man in the High Castle	General Onoda	6 episodes
2016–2017	Veep	Lu Chi-Jung	3 episodes
2017	Ransom	Senator Vang	Episode: "Say What You Did"
2017	The Catch	Kenji Yoshida	Episode: "The Hammer"
2017	Criminal Minds: Beyond Borders	Inspector Cheong	Episode: "Cinderella and the Dragon"
2018	Silicon Valley	Factory owner Yao	3 episodes
2018	The Resident	Ted Zhou	Episode: "Haunted"
2018–2019	Star Wars Resistance	Senator Hamato Xiono	Voice role; 2 episodes
2019	Wu Assassins	Mr. Young	6 episodes
2020	Bosch	Brent Charles	2 episodes
2020	A Sugar & Spice Holiday	Pete Yung	Television film
2021–2023	Kung Fu	Jin Chen	39 episodes
2024	Interior Chinatown	Joe Wu	
2025–2026	Invincible	Mr. Liu	Voice role
2025	Watson	Uncle Ju	Episodes: "Back from the Dead" and "Giant Steps"

== Awards ==
Ma has received awards for his acting roles including the Cine Golden Eagle Award for Best Actor for The Dance and The Railroad and the Garland Award for his acting in Flower Drum Song.
