= William R. Smedberg III =

United States Navy admiral (1902–1994)

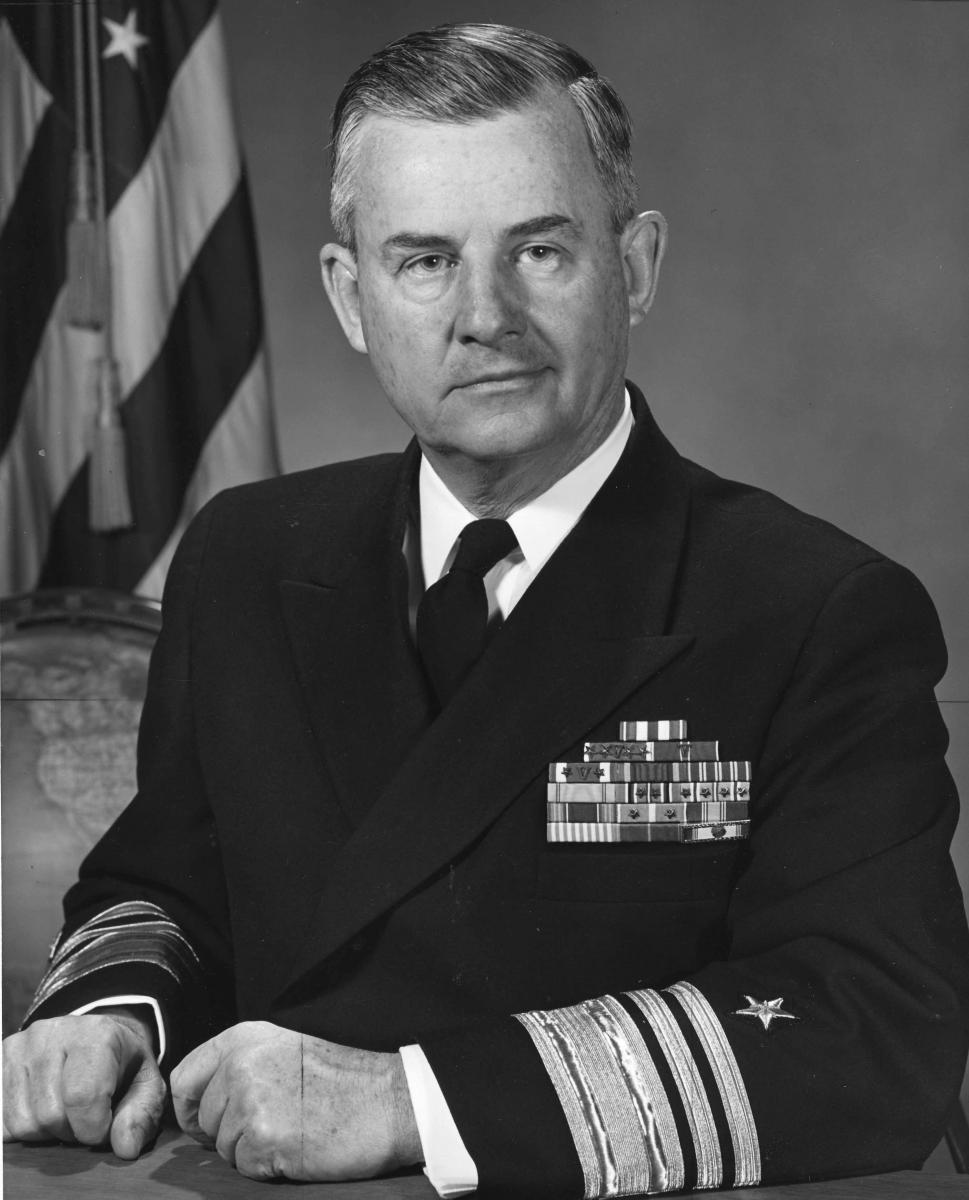
- Born: September 28, 1902; Fort Grant, Arizona, U.S.
- Died: October 5, 1994 (aged 92); Falls Church, Virginia, U.S.
- Burial place: Arlington National Cemetery
- Military career
- Allegiance: United States
- Branch: United States Navy
- Service years: 1926–1964
- Rank: Vice admiral
- Commands: Superintendent of the United States Naval Academy

William Renwick Smedberg III (September 28, 1902 – October 5, 1994) was a vice admiral in the United States Navy. He was Superintendent of the United States Naval Academy in Annapolis, Maryland from March 16, 1956 to June 27, 1958. During World War II, Smedberg served as commanding officer of USS Lansdowne and USS Hudson. After the war, he served as an aide to Secretary of the Navy James Forrestal. He was a 1926 graduate of the Naval Academy. He is interred in the Arlington National Cemetery along with his father, Brigadier General William Renwick Smedberg Jr., USA, and his son Rear Admiral William Renwick Smedberg IV, USN. Smedberg had also commanded the USS Iowa.
