= DisOrient Film Festival =

Film festival in Oregon, US

- Location: Eugene, Oregon
- Established: 2006
- Founded by: Jason Mak
- Producers: Chinese Consolidated Benevolent Association
- Website: https://disorientfilm.wordpress.com

The DisOrient Film Festival or the DisOrient Asian and Pacific Islander American Film Festival of Oregon (also known as the DisOrient Asian American Film Festival of Oregon), is a film festival that was started in 2006 and is based in Eugene, Oregon. According to their website and mission statement, the organization is "a grassroots and volunteer-run film festival committed to presenting honest portrayals of the diversity of the Asian and Pacific Islander American experience" and when "selecting new and exciting films for our festival" the W.E.B. Du Bois standard of "for us, by us, or about us" is used to select recent and undistributed works. It was founded in 2006 by Jason Mak.

== Background ==
Disorient is also a program of the Chinese American Benevolent Association, a Eugene, Oregon based 501(c)(3) non-profit cultural arts organization in Oregon that runs a Chinese Lion dance youth group, composed mostly of middle school, high school, and college age students, as well as offers college scholarships for local Asian American youth and aspiring filmmakers.

== Films showcased ==
The film festival has showcased a number of notable films from leading Asian and Asian American filmmakers, including Justin Lin's Finishing the Game (2007), Juwan Chung's Baby (2008) (where Chung won a Best Director award in the 2008 festival), Jessica Yu's Ping Pong Playa (2007) (which won a Best Feature Film award at the festival), Dave Boyle's Surrogate Valentine (2011) (which won a Best Feature Film award at the 2011 festival), Jeff Chiba Stearns' One Big Hapa Family (2010) (the 2011 festival Opening Night film), Minh Duc Nguyen's Touch (2011) (Opening Night film of the 2012 Festival) and more.

2014's Opening Night film and Best Picture winner is Steven J. Kung's A Leading Man. Other films that have won Best Film at the festival include Kimberlee Bassford's documentary, Patsy Mink: Ahead of the Majority (2008), a documentary about Patsy Mink, the first woman of color and the first Asian American woman elected to U.S. Congress.

== Awards and venue ==
Every year, the festival also awards the Jason D. Mak Award for Social Justice and the Pacific Asian Community Alliance Courage Award to narrative or documentary films that exhibit compelling social issues. The recipient of those two awards in 2012 was Konrad Alderer's Enemy Alien. The festival also awards Best Feature Film, Best Director and Best Short Film (also called the Third Eye Best Short Film Award) annually as well. Previous winners of the Best Short Film award include Vincent Lin's Love, NY (starring Randall Park), J.P. Chan's Beijing Haze, Brendan Uegama's Henry's Glasses.

Usually the film festival is held at the Bijou Art Cinemas in Eugene, Oregon. The film festival has received strong commendations from filmmakers such as Patrick Epino, J.P. Chan, William Lu, singer Dawen, Gia Vang and more.
