= Howard Lachtman =

American academic

- Born: Howard Lawrence Lachtman; July 8, 1941 (age 85); San Francisco, California, U.S.
- Education: M.A., Ph.D.
- Occupations: Critic, editor, author
- Notable work: Sherlock Slept Here

Howard Lawrence Lachtman (born July 8, 1941) is an American academic, literary critic, editor and author, who has written extensively on the life and works of Jack London, Arthur Conan Doyle, and on crime fiction as a whole.

== Early life and career ==
Born in San Francisco on July 8, 1941, Lachtman is the second-born child of Florence (née Jacoby) and George Lachtman. He attended Winfield Scott Elementary School, Lowell High School, UC Berkeley and UC Hastings Law, and obtained his M.A and Ph.D. from University of the Pacific.

Assessing Lachtman's contribution to a 1979 collection of London's own essays entitled Jack London: No Mentor But Myself, Los Angeles Times critic Sal Noto states:

This collection also contains a broad and perceptive foreword by Howard Lachtman, who has three books in the making on London. Lachtman shows the unfamiliar side of the London persona; he pares away much of the myth surrounding the man and offers a candid look at a writer who has all too often been dismissed or overlooked by critics of American literature.

Reviewing Lachtman's 1982 anthology, Sporting Blood: Jack London's Greatest Sports Writing, the El Paso Herald-Post's David Innes notes that the book "could serve as a pattern for what a good theme anthology should be," adding that "Lachtman's introductory essay is a fine one, as are his short, scene-setting paragraphs." Regarding the 1984 collection, Young Wolf: The Early Adventure Stories of Jack London, El Paso Times critic Dale L. Walker writes:

Lachtman's fine collection of London's early career adventure stories adds an important link to an astonishingly long chain of London stories published in the past two decades. [It] includes some of London's best early work. Here are 16 stories that ought to be read in high school and college classrooms today in lieu of the shopworn "To Build a Fire".

Writing two years later in the same paper, Walker calls Lachtman's Sherlock Slept Here a "superb and authoritative little study [of] Arthur Conan Doyle's debt to the United States," commending in particular Lachtman's "thoroughly fascinating analysis of that most American of Holmes stories, 'The Adventure of the Noble Bachelor'."

Lachtman also reviewed books—primarily mysteries—for the Los Angeles Times between 1976 and 1981, and, from 1977 to 1986, for the San Francisco Examiner.

A decidedly unimposing fictional character named Howard Lachtman, (Note: So unimposing, in fact, that the novel's narrator/protagonist promptly likens him to the aptly named, famously unimposing Hollywood character actor Donald Meek.) who happens to be at least the nominal leader of a small group of Sherlock Holmes devotees, figures prominently in Chapter II of Stuart Kaminsky's 1983 detective novel He Done Her Wrong.

== Personal life ==
Since 1962, Lachtman has been married to the former Mendelle Corren, a union which produced at least one child, their daughter, Tiffany.

== Works ==
=== Books ===
- Sporting Blood: Selections from Jack London's greatest sports writing. Novato, CA : Presidio Press. 1981 OCLC 1151317362.
- Young Wolf: The Early Adventure Stories of Jack London. Santa Barbara, CA : Capra Press. 1984. ISBN 9780884962106.
- Sherlock Slept Here; being a brief history of the singular adventures of Sir Arthur Conan Doyle in America, with some observations upon the exploits of Mr. Sherlock Holmes. Santa Barbara, CA : Capra Press. 1985. ISBN 088496227X.

=== Essays ===
- "Man and Superwoman in Jack London's 'The Kanaka Surf'"].] Western American Literature. Summer 1972. Vol. VII, No. 2, pp. 101–110
- "All That Glitters: Jack London's Gold". Jack London Newsletter. September–December, 1972. pp. 172–175, 196–178.
- "Doyle in Dreamland: The education of an eminent Victorian". The Los Angeles Times. October 30, 1977. Sec. Reviews, pp. 3, 20.
- "The Nine Lives of Jack London". The San Francisco Examiner. November 6, 1977.
- "Oscar in California: A Wilde West Show". The Los Angeles Times. September 24, 1978.
- "Willard Wright's Philo Vance: A Dandy in Acid". Los Angeles Times. June 3, 1979. Sec. Reviews, pp. 3, 25.
- "Mysterious Case of the Gardner-Chandler Friendship". The Los Angeles Times. January 4, 1981.
- "When Jack London Answered the Call of the Orange Blossoms". The Los Angeles Times. March 30, 1981. Sec. Reviews, pg. 3.

=== Poetry ===
- "Losses for Review" (1970)
- "Three Poems: Fat City, The River Merchant to His Wife: A Letter, News from Thermopylae" (1972)
- "Elegy for William Claude Dunkenfield (W. C. Fields)" (1972)
- "Handiwork" (2021)
- "Sentry" (2021)
- "One of the Lucky Ones" (2023)
