= Lloyd Suh =

American playwright

- Education: Indiana University Bloomington (BA); The New School for Social Research (MFA)
- Occupation: Playwright
- Writing career
- Notable awards: Alpert Award in the Arts (2019)

Lloyd Suh is an American playwright and the recipient of the 2019 Herb Alpert Award in the Arts in theatre.

== Life ==
Suh is a second-generation Korean-American. He was born around 1975 and is originally from Indianapolis, Indiana. He graduated from Indiana University Bloomington.

== Career ==
His plays have been performed in the United States with Ma-Yi, the Play Company, Ensemble Studio Theatre, La Mama ETC, Magic Theatre and the Denver Center Theatre Company. They have been performed internationally at the Cultural Center of the Philippines in Manila and with the PCPA in Seoul, Korea.

Starting in 2015, he has been a member of the Dramatists Guild Council. He joined The Lark as the Director of Artistic Programs in 2011. From 2005 to 2010 he was the Artistic Director of Second Generation and Co-Director of the Ma-Yi Writers Lab.

Suh was on the National Steering Committee for the creation of the first National Asian American Theatre Conference and the first National Asian American Theatre Festival.

He is an alum of EST's Youngblood and the Soho Rep Writer Director Lab. He received his BA from Indiana University Bloomington in 1998 and his Master of Fine Arts from the New School for Social Research.

== Works ==
His plays include: The Chinese Lady, The Far Country, Charles Francis Chan Jr's Exotic Oriental Murder Mystery, Franklinland, The Wong Kids in the Secret of the Space Chupacabra Go!, American Hwangap, Jesus in India, Great Wall Story and The Heart Sellers.

== Awards ==
In 2016, Suh received the Helen Merrill Award and in 2019 he was the recipient of the Herb Alpert Award in the Arts. He was named one of the "50 to Watch" by the Dramatists Guild. In 2020 he was awarded a John Simon Guggenheim Memorial Foundation Fellow Award.

His play The Chinese Lady was nominated for the 2022 Drama Desk Award for Outstanding Play. Suh was a finalist for the 2023 Pulitzer Prize for Drama for his play The Far Country.
