= The Far Country (play) =

2022 American play by Lloyd Suh

- Written by: Lloyd Suh
- Subject: Chinese Exclusion Act
- Setting: San Francisco Bay Area

Premiere
- Date: December 5, 2022
- Place: Atlantic Theater Company

The Far Country is a 2022 American play by Lloyd Suh. The play follows an unlikely family's immigration from Taishan, Guangdong to the San Francisco Bay Area in the wake of the Chinese Exclusion Act during the early 20th century. The Far Country was a finalist for the 2023 Pulitzer Prize for Drama.

== Production history ==
=== Atlantic Theater Company (2022) ===
The Far Country had its world and Off-Broadway premiere on December 5, 2022, at Atlantic Theater Company's Linda Gross Theater. The production was directed by Eric Ting.

=== Berkeley Repertory Theatre (2024) ===
The Far Country had its West Coast premiere on March 8, 2024, at Berkeley Repertory Theatre's Peet's Theatre. The production was directed by Jennifer Chang.

== Reception ==
The show has received positive reviews. It earned the Critic's Pick designation by The New York Times, with critic Alexis Soloski praising that The Far Country "meditates on ethnicity and identity...an act, loving and sorrowful, of reclamation, salvaging the history of early generations of Chinese Americans."
