= Jack Meagher (Australian footballer) =

Australian rules footballer

Personal information
- Full name: Jack Meagher
- Born: 23 July 1930 (age 96)
- Original team: East Ballarat
- Height: 182 cm (6 ft 0 in)
- Weight: 82 kg (181 lb)

Playing career^{1}
Years	Club	Games (Goals)
1953–54	South Melbourne	4 (4)
- ^{1} Playing statistics correct to the end of 1954.

Jack Meagher (born 23 July 1930) is a former Australian rules footballer who played with South Melbourne in the Victorian Football League (VFL).
