= William Renwick Smedberg Jr. =

U.S. Army brigadier general

- Smedberg as commander of the 63rd Infantry Brigade, 1919
- Born: January 3, 1871; San Francisco, California, U.S.
- Died: October 9, 1942 (aged 71); Washington, D.C.
- Burial place: Arlington National Cemetery
- Spouse(s): Louise Gore Chaffin (m. 1901–1942), his death
- Children: 3 (including William R. Smedberg III)
- Relatives: George W. McIver (brother-in-law)
- Military career
- Allegiance: California; United States
- Branch: California National Guard; United States Army
- Service years: 1884–1889 (National Guard); 1893–1935 (Army)
- Rank: Brigadier General
- Service number: 0-421
- Unit: U.S. Army Cavalry Branch
- Commands: Company K (Cadet Company), 1st Infantry Regiment, California National Guard; 305th Infantry Regiment; 153rd Infantry Brigade; 63rd Infantry Brigade; Military District of Arizona; 8th Cavalry Regiment; 2nd Cavalry Brigade
- Conflicts: Spanish–American War; Philippine–American War; World War I
- Awards: Silver Star (2)

William Renwick Smedberg Jr. (January 3, 1871 – October 9, 1942) was a career officer in the United States Army. A veteran of the Spanish–American War, Philippine–American War, and World War I, he attained the rank of brigadier general and was most notable for his command of the 305th Infantry Regiment, 153rd Infantry Brigade, 63rd Infantry Brigade, Military District of Arizona, 8th Cavalry Regiment, and 2nd Cavalry Brigade.

== Early life ==
"Our Veterans and Their Commanders," a caricature of California Grand Army of the Republic members published in The Wasp, April 25, 1885. Smedberg's father is seated fourth from right.

Smedberg was born in San Francisco, California on January 3, 1871, the son of Fanny Marie (Raymond) Smedberg and Colonel William Renwick Smedberg. The senior Smedberg was a Union Army veteran of the American Civil War who was wounded and lost a leg at the Battle of the Wilderness. The younger Smedberg attended the schools of San Francisco and graduated from Lowell High School. While attending high school, Smedberg gained his initial military experience as a member of the California National Guard's Company K (Cadet Company), 1st Infantry Regiment, which he rose to command with the rank of captain.

In August 1888, Smedberg was appointed to the United States Military Academy by Congressman William W. Morrow. He began attendance in 1889 and graduated in 1893, ranked 16 of 51. Smedberg was commissioned as a second lieutenant of Cavalry.

== Early career ==
Initially assigned to the 4th Cavalry Regiment, Smedberg served first at Fort Bidwell, California, then at the Presidio of San Francisco. He was noted for his athletic prowess, and early in his military career he took part in sports including baseball, football, and horse racing. In 1896, Smedberg was assigned to the West Point staff, first as a cadet tactical officer, then as an instructor in modern languages.

During the Spanish–American War in 1898, Smedberg served as aide-de-camp to Brigadier General Samuel Baldwin Marks Young, who commanded one of two brigades that made up the Cavalry division commanded by Joseph Wheeler. He took part in the Battle of Las Guasimas and Battle of San Juan Hill, and was officially commended by Leonard Wood, the commander of the 1st U.S. Volunteer Cavalry Regiment ("Rough Riders"), which was part of Young's command. Smedberg received the Citation Star to recognize his wartime heroism. When the Silver Star was created in 1932, Smedberg's decoration was converted to the new medal.

During the Philippine–American War of 1899 to 1901, Smedberg continued to serve as an aide to Young, who commanded first a provisional brigade in the 1st Division of the Eighth Army Corps, and then the 1st District of the Department of Northern Luzon. Subsequent investigation of possible atrocities by the U.S. military highlighted Smedberg's efforts to prevent soldiers from looting Filipino homes and personal property.

== Continued career ==
After returning from the Philippines, Smedberg was promoted to captain and assigned to the 14th Cavalry Regiment, which performed duty in the Department of California from 1901 to 1902, and the Department of Colorado from 1902 to 1903. In 1903, he returned to the Philippines and was assigned to the Department of Mindanao. From 1905 to 1907 he was assigned to the Department of the Columbia, and from 1907 to 1909 he served again with Department of California.

In 1909, Smedberg was assigned as an instructor at the School of Musketry at the Presidio of Monterey. From 1910 to 1912, he commanded a troop of the 14th Cavalry at Fort Stotsenburg in the Philippines. In 1912, he was posted to Fort Clark, Texas as a member of the board created to consider machine gun weapons and tactics and make recommendations for procurement and training. From 1912 to 1913, Smedberg again served as an instructor at the School of Musketry.

Smedberg was assigned to the 2nd Cavalry Regiment in 1913 and assigned to Fort Ethan Allen, Vermont. He specialized in training units on the use of machine guns, and oversaw the camps of instruction for National Guard units at Fort Ethan Allen, Plattsburgh Barracks, and Madison Barracks between 1913 and 1917. In July 1916, he received promotion to major, and in June 1917 he was promoted to lieutenant colonel.

== World War I ==
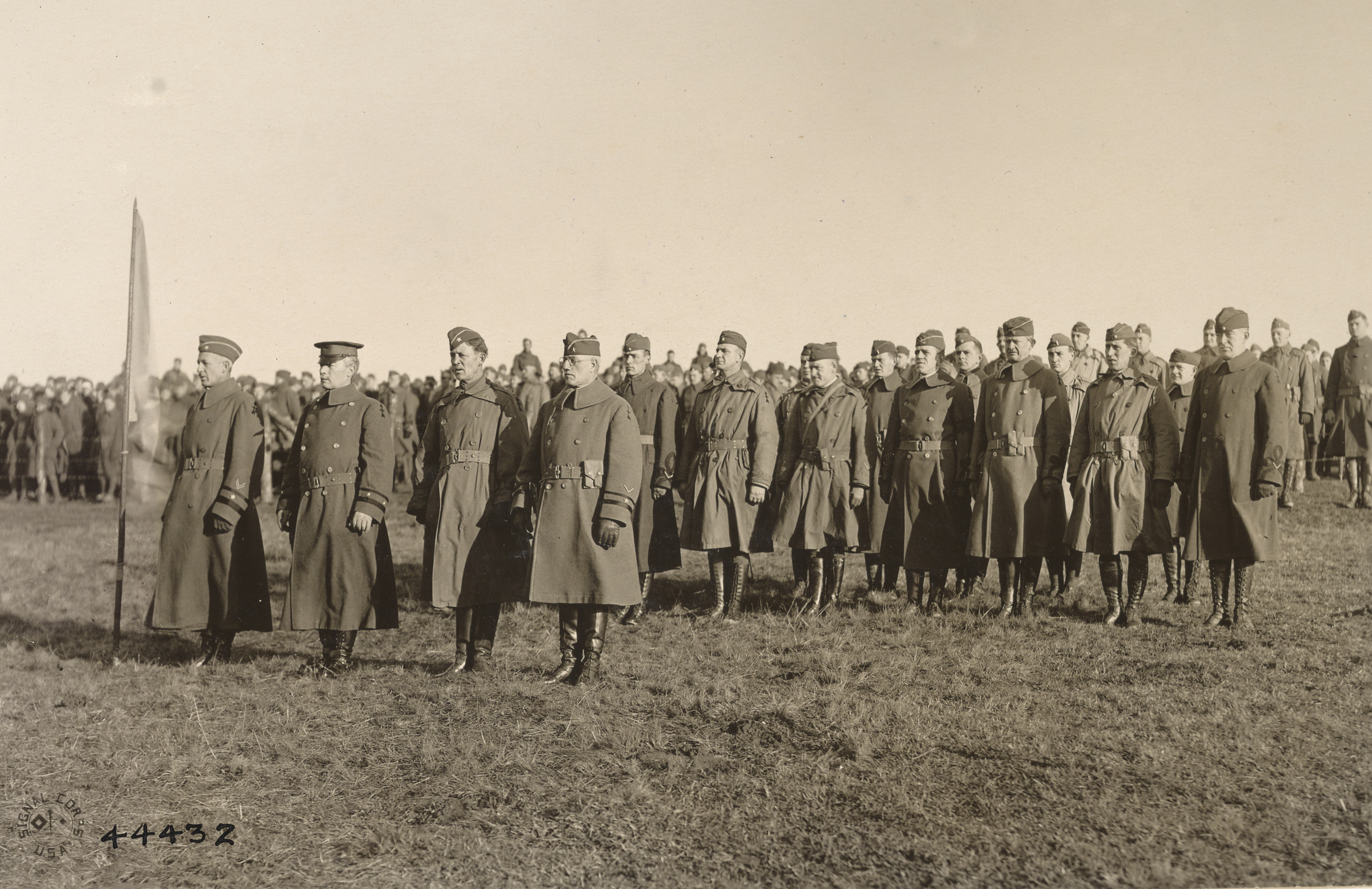
Major General William Lassiter, commanding the 32nd Division, along with senior division commanders and staff at the presentation of medals to men of the division at Dierdorf, Germany, December 1918. Brigadier General Smedberg, commanding the 63rd Brigade, is fourth on the left in the front row.

In August 1917, Smedberg was promoted to colonel and assigned to command the 305th Infantry Regiment, a unit of the 77th Division. He led this unit through its organization and training at Camp Upton, New York and subsequent combat in France. Smedberg participated in the Oise–Aisne and Meuse–Argonne offensives, and remained in command until October 23, 1918, when he was promoted to temporary brigadier general and assigned to command the 77th Division's 153rd Infantry Brigade.

On November 24, Smedberg assumed command of the 63rd Infantry Brigade, a unit of the 32nd Division. He remained in command of this unit during the post-war Occupation of the Rhineland, and returned to the United States in May 1919. Smedberg received a second award of the Silver Star to recognize his wartime heroism.

== Post-World War I ==
After the war, Smedberg was assigned to command the Military District of Arizona, with responsibility for maintaining the security of the border with Mexico and he reverted to the permanent rank of colonel. In 1921, he graduated from the Command and General Staff College, and he subsequently completed the course at the Army War College. His post-war assignments included inspector general of the Ninth Corps Area, assistant to the deputy chief of staff for personnel (G-1) on the Army general staff, commander of the 8th Cavalry Regiment, and commander of the 2nd Cavalry Brigade. His terminal assignment was chief of the administrative division at the National Guard Bureau, where he served from 1932 to 1935.

At the time of his retirement in January 1935, Smedberg held the permanent rank of colonel. In 1930, the U.S. Congress enacted a law allowing World War I general officers to retire at the highest rank they had held during the war. As a result, Smedberg was promoted to brigadier general on the Army's retired list.

== Retirement and death ==
In retirement, Smedberg was a resident of Washington, D.C. He died at Walter Reed General Hospital in Washington on October 9, 1942. Smedberg was buried at Arlington National Cemetery.

== Family ==
In 1901, Smedberg married Louise Gore Chaffin (1879–1977). They remained married until his death. The Smedbergs were the parents of three children, William Renwick III, Converse Chaffin, and George Chaffin. William R. Smedberg III was a career officer in the United States Navy and retired as a Vice admiral. Smedberg's grandson, William R. Smedberg IV (1929–2008), attained the rank of rear admiral in the U.S. Navy, and another grandson, Edwin Barden Smedberg, served in the U.S. Navy and retired as a captain.

Smedberg's sister Helen Howard Smedberg (1869–1953) was the husband of George W. McIver. McIver was an 1882 West Point graduate who attained the rank of brigadier general before retiring in 1922.
