= David Huynh =

Canadian actor (born 1983)

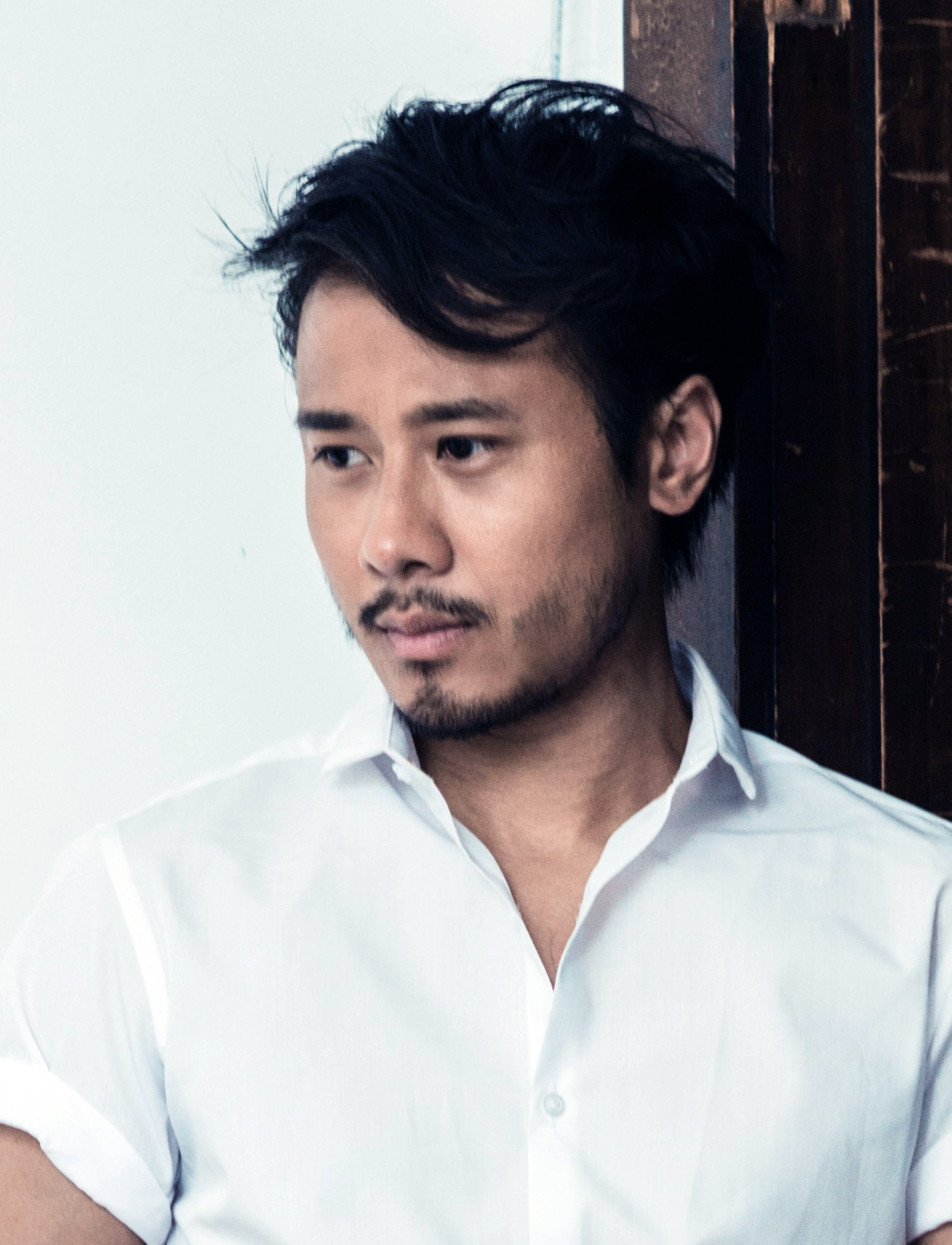
- Born: February 5, 1983 (age 43); Vancouver, British Columbia, Canada
- Occupation: Actor
- Years active: 1998–present
- Website: http://www.david-huynh.com

David Huynh (born February 5, 1983) is a Canadian actor.

== Early life ==
Huynh was born in Vancouver, British Columbia, Canada, briefly studied at the University of Manitoba focusing on a major in theater and a minor in film studies. Huynh continues to study with acting coach Marjorie Ballentine and Terry Knickerbocker.

== Career ==
Huynh has appeared on TV shows such as ER (as Leo), Cold Case (as Billy Takahashi, as the son of Ray Takahashi, played by Ian Anthony Dale) and Without A Trace (as Frankie Jones, opposite Jessika Van who plays Stacey Tan), Kevin (Probably) Saves the World and NCIS: Los Angeles. In 2008, he starred in Mark Tran's film "All About Dad" (Winner of the Cinequest Film Festival Audience Award for Best Feature) as a Biology major named Ty Do who quits his studies to pursue a career in filmmaking.

Huynh won a Special Jury Prize Award at the 2007 Los Angeles Asian Pacific Film Festival for Outstanding Newcomer and Best Emerging Actor for his performance in Juwan Chung's Baby, which also won a Special Jury Award for Best Feature Length Film at that year's Festival. Huynh has starred in several of Byron Q's films, including Bang Bang (2011), which won a Special Jury Award for Best First Feature, Narrative, at the 2011 Los Angeles Asian Pacific Film Festival., and Las Vegas Story. He also appears as the protagonist "Fong" in a pilot entitled "Chinatown Squad" about 1890s San Francisco Chinatown, directed and produced by Stephane Gauger and written by and starring Baby co-star Feodor Chin, who plays the antagonist, "Pistol Pete."

Huynh has appeared on stage at Sacred Fools Theater Company, The Kirk Douglas Theater, starred as "Neil" in the East West Players Production of Prince Gomolvilas' play adaptation of Scott Heim's Mysterious Skin, for which he was named "Best Actor in A Play" at the 20th Annual Ticket Holder Awards of 2010 and as a Best Featured Performance on Theater Critic Don Grigware's "The Best in Los Angeles Theater 2010", and starred at The Colony Theater as "Vuthy" in Michael Golamco's play Year Zero.

In 2021, Huynh portrayed CJ Lam throughout season 4 of The Sinner.

== Filmography ==
Year	Title	Role
1998	The Adventures of Shirley Holmes	Werewolf
2002	2030 CE	Med Sec Hall Monitor
2006	Invasion	Sun Kim
2007	Cold Case	Billy Takahashi
2008	Baby	Baby
2009	ER	Leo
2009	All About Dad	Ty Do
2009	Without A Trace	Frankie Jones
2011	Bang Bang	Charlie
2013	Las Vegas Story	Jonathan Chen
2017	Kevin (Probably) Saves the World	Vong
2017	M.F.A.	Shane
2017	NCIS: Los Angeles	Bartender
2021	The Sinner	CJ Lam
2023	Magnum P.I.	Boa Tan
2023	Star Trek: Strange New Worlds	Zacarias "Zac" Nguyen
