= Zenyatta (Overwatch) =

Fictional character in the Overwatch franchise

Tekhartha Zenyatta
- Overwatch character
- Zenyatta's appearance in Overwatch
- First game: Overwatch (2016)
- Created by: Scott Mercer
- Designed by: Arnold Tsang
- Voiced by: Feodor Chin

In-universe information
- Race: Omnic
- Class: Support
- Origin: Nepal

Tekhartha Zenyatta is a character who appears in the 2016 video game Overwatch, a Blizzard Entertainment–developed first-person hero shooter, and the resulting franchise. An omnic monk in Nepal, he is part of a group that seeks peaceful co-existence with humans, as the robotic omnics believe they have a soul much like humans. Over the course of the game's story, he forms ties with several characters; he has a brotherly bond with fellow omnic Ramattra despite the latter's stance against humanity.

Zenyatta was well received upon debut, praised for his cool and relaxed personality. At the same time, Blizzard has been criticized for how little the character has been meaningfully utilized in the game's story. His relationship with Ramattra has become a topic of interest amongst fans, with some praising the writing while others have engaged in shipping the two together in a yaoi relationship. Meanwhile, academic approaches to the character have both analyzed how players approach his game as a supportive character that can also deal damage, but also in regards to the cultural themes represented in his character and in-game cosmetics.

== Conception and development ==
Designed by Arnold Tsang, Zenyatta began as a concept of a cyber monk created by artist Scott Mercer. While early drafts portrayed him as physically powerful, they felt this made him too similar to existing characters. As a result, they revised the design, shifting away from a martial artists to an "enlightened sage". To further set him apart from other characters, they gave him the ability to levitate. Early designs would have also had Zenyatta having multiple physical arms, though the final version instead gave him only two physical arms. The idea was still retained to some extent, with multiple holographic arms appearing when a player activated his ultimate ability.

Zenyatta was the second Support-class character implemented for the game, following Mercy. Realizing they had a lot of fast moving characters in the game who often went into areas close-range healers would not want to directly follow, they designed him around the concept of "giving [players] a gift and having them travel on their way" and able to heal remotely with his orbs attaching to targets. These orbs were originally the physical ones that surrounded his body, however this led to some complications as the development team considered how he would be able to "reload" them like a traditional weapon. They chose instead that the orbs themselves would fire bursts of energy, with different coloration depending on the offensive and defensive nature of them.

After designing Zenyatta, a member of the development team proposed the idea of other characters that looked similar to him. Arnold Tsang drew up subsequent designs based off Zenyatta's, and the team developed the concept to be a synthetic race of robots called "Omnics" in Overwatch's universe.

=== Design ===
Zenyatta stands 5 feet 8 inches (172 cm) tall and is a thin, humanoid, silver-colored robot with gold highlights. Pistons are visible on his arms, torso, hands and feet. His head is oval-shaped with a gold lower jaw. Above his eyes is a grid of nine blue lights. His outfit consists of yellow pants torn midway down the lower leg, a beige back skirt with a black pattern, a gold sash, and a red dhoti atop these that dangles down his front. A red ribbon cable connects from his back to his right upper hip, while tassel beads are tied to his sash and dangle behind him. Zenyatta does not walk, instead hovering above the ground as he moves with his legs bent under his body.

Like other Overwatch characters, Zenyatta received skins, which are unlockable cosmetic items to change his in-game appearance. When designing them, due to the complex nature of his orbs they avoided changing their designs dramatically, and instead chose to retexture them in ways that reflected the nature of each skin. His shoulders also proved troublesome for the design team, as due to Zenyatta's range of motion they had to account for his animations which limited what textures and fabrics they could use. Notable skins of note include his "Ra" and "Djinnyatta" skins, which reference the Egyptian God Ra and Middle Eastern djinns respectively; they felt the enlightened mythological figures reflected his sage-like qualities.

In Overwatch 2, a scarf was added to his design, and he was given new pants and shoes. His orbs also saw a slight redesign. Despite these changes, many of his design elements remained the same from the original game.

== Appearances ==
Zenyatta is a member of the Shambali, an order of omnic monks in the 2016 video game Overwatch. Situated in the Himalayas in northern Nepal, after experiencing a "spiritual awakening", the Shambali believe that, like humans, omnics also possess a soul. Their leader, Tekhartha Mondatta, sought to heal the rift between humans and omnics brought about by the Omnic Crisis, a conflict preceding the events of the game in which omnics attacked humanity but later gained sentience. During this time, he formed a brotherhood with fellow omnic Ramattra, though the latter leaves the monastery to lead a crusade against humans through his group Null Sector. Zenyatta meets the cybernetic ninja Genji and helps him come to terms with his modified body. Zenyatta is voiced by Feodor Chin.

The Invasion story content for Overwatch further expands on Zenyatta and Ramattra's relationship, showing their discussion following the death of Mondatta, who was killed by the terrorist organization Talon's sniper, Widowmaker. Ramattra attempts to convince Zenyatta to join him, while the latter tries to convince him to see the similarities between omnics and humans, and the two depart in disagreement. At the end of Invasion's storyline, Widowmaker is shown to have found Zenyatta for an undisclosed party. The undisclosed party is later revealed to be Ramattra, who tries again to convince Zenyatta to join him as Null Sector retreats for now, but the offer is refused due to the groups brutal methods against fellow omnics.

In 2020, Zenyatta was featured in the short story Stone by Stone. In it, the character Symmetra helps with restoration efforts after a tremor caused by property development in Roshani, India damages a nearby temple's religious statue. She meets with Zenyatta, who teaches her about his religion and helps her understand the statue's significance. As a result, rather than replacing it she uses yellow hard-light to repair it, giving it a warm glow and pleasing all involved.

=== Gameplay ===
In Overwatch, Zenyatta is classified as a Support-class character, meant to provide aid for his team. Rather than moving on foot, he floats above the ground in a meditative pose. He is surrounded by a circle of nine floating metal orbs resembling prayer beads, which are named the "Orbs of Destruction". These can be used to a launch a form of energy at foes either one at a time, or through a charged-shot which deals extra damage. His melee attack "Snap Kick" kicks a single target, knocking them back.

In addition to these, Zenyatta has two abilities that can be activated separately. "Orb of Harmony" applies an orb that grants healing to the targeted ally while its attached to them, while "Orb of Discord" can be attached to an enemy to increase the damage they take. Only one of each orb type can be active at any one time. Lastly his Ultimate ability, "Transcendence", needs to be charged before use. The ability charges slowly over time, and can be charged faster through damage dealt to the enemy team or healing provided to allies. Once fully charged, the ability can be activated to make him immune to all damage for a short period of time, healing all allies around him. During this time his movement speed will increase, however he will be unable to attack or use any abilities.

== Promotion and reception ==
To promote Overwatch and the character, Zenyatta was one of twelve heroes showcased in a playable build of the game at the 2014 BlizzCon convention. Various material was also released to promote the character such as a cosplay guide, promotional images themed around holidays, apparel by the clothing company Jinx, several figures by Funko Pop, and a Figma-line figure from Good Smile Company.

Since his debut, Zenyatta has been well received as a character. Levi Rubeck of Kill Screen described Zenyatta as the embodiment of "be cool", comparing him to the protagonist of manga series Haven't You Heard? I'm Sakamoto in how both were stylish and "super-chill", presenting themselves as never being flustered. These sentiments were echoed by James Whitbrook of Gizmodo who appreciated how much of a departure Zenyatta was from more traditional characters in the first-person shooter due to his means of attacking relying on his spheres and prayer to "reload" them. He additionally praised Zenyatta's monotone voice as "excellently chill", feeling that even in moments of failure it made Zenyatta feel adorable.

Despite being introduced with the game's release, Zenyatta has been considered often overlooked by the game's lore developments, particularly in light of other characters and despite having ties to other characters in the game's cast. Blizzard's third party browser-based parody game Loverwatch in particular made light of this issue, with Zenyatta stating in his introductory cutscene it was "sad" the non-canon game was the only place the character could get new content. Polygon's Cass Marshall in particular felt the character was overlooked by both the playerbase and the developers, and suggested that if the playerbase made more use of him over more contemporary support characters the developers may take notice, especially as the character was tied to a major event in Overwatch's continuity.

Zenyatta's relationships with other characters have also been a subject of discussion. Associate professor of the University of Tennessee Małgorzata Karolina Citko-DuPlantis likened his relationship with Genji to that of historical figures Benkei and Minamoto no Yoshitsune, providing a contemporary modern view of the figures while also helping to solidify Genji's image as a warrior. Meanwhile, the staff of United Daily News highlighted his in-game dialogue with Ramattra as a standout, enjoying that it felt organic while fans drew art of the characters in romantic tension as a form of yaoi shipping. Amy Chen in an article for esports.gg commented on the latter, feeling that engaging in such speculation around characters was one of the more engaging ways for fans of a franchise to connect with one another, with one group of fans creating a 200 page zine celebrating the ship.

=== Analysis of cultural themes and gameplay ===
In terms of representation, researchers Joong-Gon Lee and Tae-Gu Lee in a paper for the Journal of Korea Game Society observed that Zenyatta's character design was a pastiche of robots with Tibetan Mahayana Buddhism. However, as Buddhism was a foreign concept to many American audiences, they observed that the developers instead emphasized the concept of a robot having religious beliefs, which in itself was a new concept for such audiences. Shahryar Rizvi in an article for Kill Screen meanwhile argued that several of his skins, particularly the "Djinnyatta" and "Ifrit" skins, represented Orientalist views of those mythological figures, as their appearances relied primarily on European adaptations of said figures. He argued that such arose from an attempt to Other Middle Eastern cultures through "hateful stereotyping or idealistic fetishizing that enables colonization and exploitation". Additionally, the mix of cultural aspects such as the use of harem pants caused them, in his view, to blur the ground between cultural appropriation and direct stereotypes.

Zenyatta's gameplay has also received commentary, as unlike other Support-class characters at the time of Overwatch's release, he was particularly notable for having high offensive capabilities. This contrast and its effects on players utilizing the character at a high-level of competitive play was the subject of a study by several researchers in the journal Procedia Computer Science, due to the perceived high skill level the character required. Using a data algorithm for analysis, they observed the differences between high and low win rate players and how they adjusted to Zenyatta's traits, for example focusing less on head shots against opponents and relying on a secondary healer for the team.
