= Juwan Chung =

American director and writer

- Born: Juwan Chung; 1983 (age 41–42); United States of America
- Occupation(s): Director, writer
- Years active: 2000 — present
- Website: http://www.affiliated-ent.com/

Juwan Chung (born 1983) is an American director and writer. His gangland film Baby won a Special Jury Prize for Best Feature, Narrative at the 2007 Los Angeles Asian Pacific Film Festival and lead Actor David Huynh won a Special Jury Prize at the 2007 Los Angeles Asian Pacific Film Festival for Outstanding Newcomer and Best Emerging Actor for his performance in the film. For Baby, Chung also won Best Director at the 2008 DisOrient Film Festival.

Other than Baby, Chung has Directed and Written another Feature Film entitled Cake about LA Drug Dealers that get mixed up with the Mexican Mafia, the DEA and each other - he also has a role in the film. He has also Directed a Music Video for Keyrei's single, "IF YOU GO". His Production Company is known as Affiliated Entertainment.

== Filmography ==
- Keyrei's "IF YOU GO" (2010) (Music Video)
- Baby (2008) - Writer, Director
- Cake (2004) - Writer, Director (also "Shane")
