= Los Angeles Asian Pacific Film Festival =

American film festival

- Location: Los Angeles (West Hollywood, Little Tokyo-downtown)
- Founded: 1983
- Founded by: Linda Mabalot
- Hosted by: Visual Communications (VC)
- Festival date: 38th Los Angeles Asian Pacific Film Festival (LAAPFF) from May 5 to May 13, 2022
- Language: International
- Website: Los Angeles Asian Pacific Film Festival

The Los Angeles Asian Pacific Film Festival (LAAPFF) – formerly known as VC FilmFest – is an annual film festival presented by Visual Communications (VC). It was established in 1983 by Linda Mabalot as a vehicle to promote Asian Pacific American and Asian international cinema. The festival fulfills a unique mission in illuminating the visions and voices of Asian Pacific peoples and heritage. The festival is held in Los Angeles in May, which is Asian Pacific American Heritage Month.

The festival is the largest in Southern California dedicated to showcasing films by and about Asians and Pacific Islanders. It presents about 150 films and mediaworks, including opening and closing night celebrations, a centerpiece presentation, panels, workshops, and special events.

== History ==
The Festival began working with the UCLA film department. It is one of the largest showcases of Asian and Asian American filmmaking in the United States. In 2003, the festival, held at several sites around Los Angeles, drew 10,000 people over seven days in early May 2003.

The Festival sponsored young Asian American filmmakers, such as Justin Lin, who directed, Better Luck Tomorrow.

The festival has two categories of awards in both North American and international categories.

== Activities ==
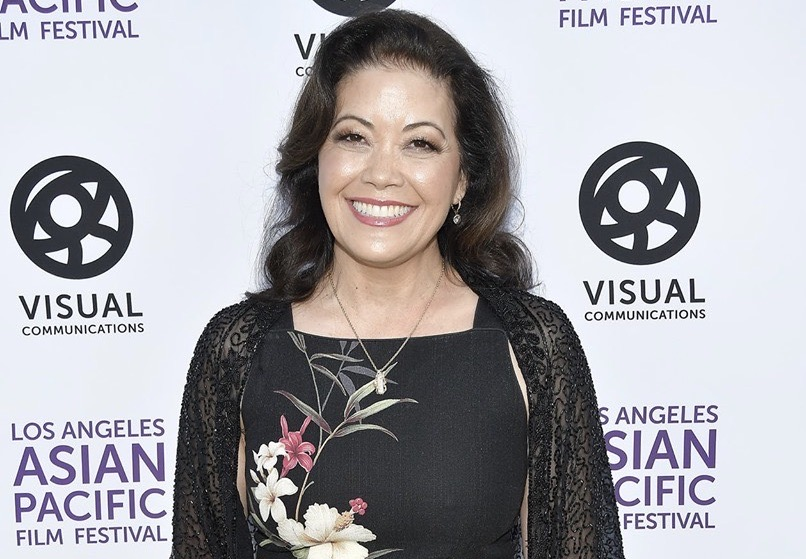
Ren Hanami at the LA APFF

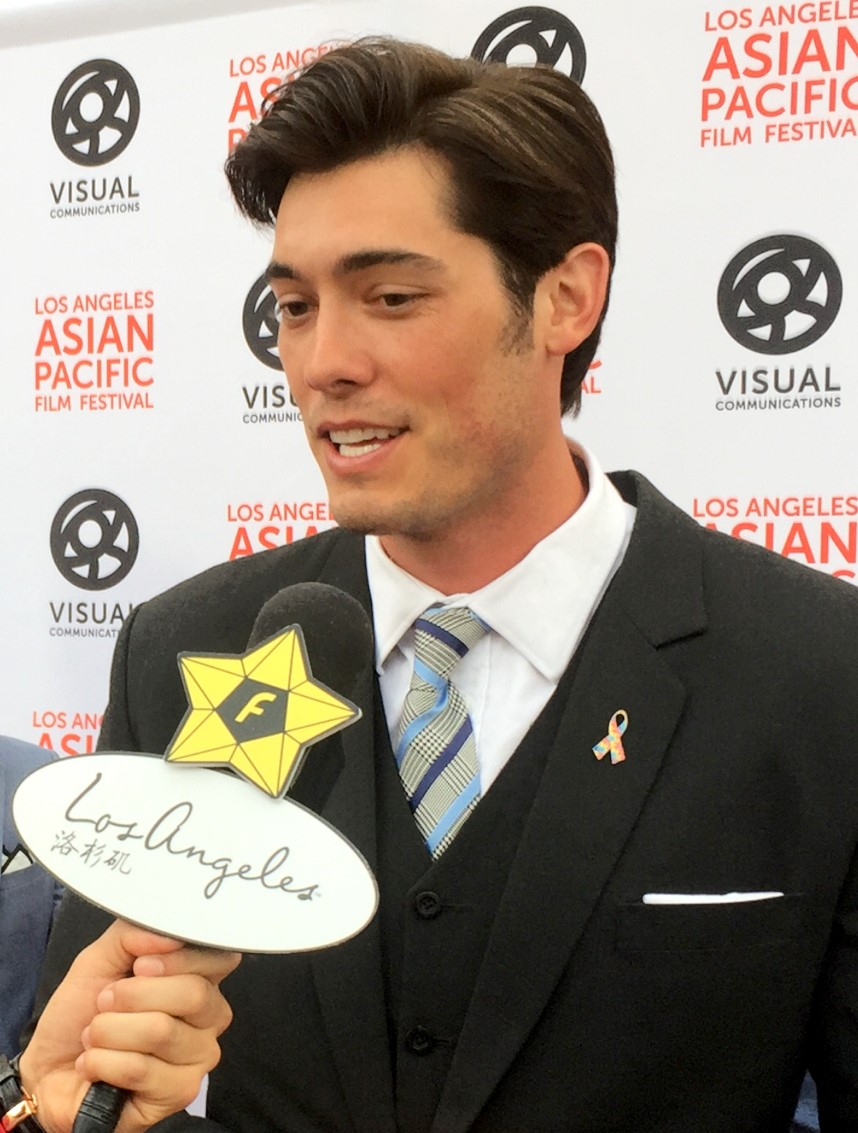
Matt William at the LA APFF

According to Justin Lin, "Mabalot allowed him to use Visual Communications’ offices in Little Tokyo for auditions and rehearsals and was a source of unwavering moral support for a movie that contradicted the image of Asian Americans as a model minority."

In 1977, Duane Kubo and Eddie Wong are two of the founding members of Visual Communications.

Linda Mabalot joined the collective of artists while walking in Little Tokyo one day in 1977 and meeting Kubo and Wong. As a result, a documentary titled “Manong,” which focused on Filipino farmworkers in the Central Valley and on Philip Vera Cruz, a Filipino American pioneer in the United Farm Workers movement was created.

In 1985, when Visual Communications, the sponsor of the festival, faced financial troubles, Mabalot earned the position of executive director.

== Events ==
- Screenings of Asian American and Asian international films
- Post-screening discussions with directors and cast members
- Industry panels on acting, directing, writing and cinematography
- Gala receptions and networking mixers

== Awards ==
LAAPFF presents juried awards to selected films in the following categories:

- Narrative Feature
- Documentary Feature
- "Golden Reel" Award for short film
- "Linda Mabalot New Directors/New Visions" Award

LAAPFF is an Academy Award-qualifying festival for "Golden Reel" Short Film Awards. The festival also presents an Audience Award for narrative feature.

== Venues ==
- Directors Guild of America theaters
- Laemmle Theatres Sunset 5
- (JANM) National Center for the Preservation of Democracy
- Aratani/Japan America Theatre
- Pacific Amphitheatre, Orange County
- The Downtown Independent
