= Jane Lui =

Jane Lui, SURRIJA
- Lui performing in 2010

Background information
- Also known as: Surrija; LuieLand
- Born: Jane Wing-Chi Lui; April 24 1979, Age 46; United States
- Origin: Los Angeles, California, United States
- Genres: Pop, rock
- Occupations: Singer-songwriter producer performer
- Instruments: Vocals; Piano; Guitar; Percussion; Melodica; Glockenspiel; Music box
- Years active: 2000–present
- Label: unsigned
- Website: www.surrija.com

Jane Wing-Chi Lui is an American singer-songwriter and multi-instrumentalist based in Southern California.

== Biography ==
Lui grew up in Hong Kong and at the age of 12, she moved to the United States.

Her musical influences include Tori Amos, Kate Bush, and Björk. She has opened for Jason Mraz, Jim Bianco, Kate Earl, Vienna Teng, Tom Brosseau, and others. In 2004, she started her solo career. Since then, she has released three albums.

Lui voices Mother Tanaka in the 2012 animated short film, Hibakusha, alongside Karin Anna Cheung, Daisuke Suzuki, and William Frederick Knight.

In 2019, Lui successfully crowdfunded her fourth album under the name SURRIJA. New tracks have now premiered on Earmilk and Audiofemme.

Lui is credited as being Opera Evelyn in the 2022 movie Everything Everywhere All at Once. She is also credited on the movie's soundtrack under the track "Opera Fight."

=== Education ===
Lui has a degree in music education from San Diego State University. She is classically trained in piano and voice.

== Discography ==
=== Albums ===
- Teargirl (2004)
1. "Yellow Light"
2. "Pigeon Woman"
3. "Blackest Crow"
4. "Blue Square"
5. "Freddie Goodtime"
6. "Playing God"
7. "Years of Roses"
8. "Phaedon"
9. "Marvelous"
10. "Rainbow Sleve"
11. "Pigeon Woman" (hidden track; produced by Greg Laswell)
- Barkentine (2007)
1. "Third place Difference"
2. "West in Me"
3. "Hunter"
4. "Libra Armor"
5. "Barkentine Interlude"
6. "Snowboots in Summer"
7. "Firefly"
8. "Surrija"
9. "Barkentine Memoir"
10. "Widowmakers"
11. "Made of Ribbons"
12. "Below" (hidden track; live from San Diego performance)
- Goodnight Company (2010)
1. "Goodnight Company"
2. "Jailcard"
3. "Edelweiss"
4. "Perished"
5. "Illusionist Boy"
6. "Southern Winds"
7. "Take Me For Now"
8. "New Jersey"
9. "Long Ago"
10. "Last Rose of Summer"

=== Others ===
- Prate and Idle Chatter (2000) – with Jason and Jane (pop duo)
- Two Fridays for Thursday (2002) – Jason and Jane (pop duo)
- Vega (2003) – with Starline Theorie, co-wrote & lead vocal (soundscape)
- Obon (2005) – Starline Theorie, co-wrote & lead vocal (soundscape)
- Opera Fight (2022) – with Son Lux and YMusic

== Awards and nominations ==
- 2009 Featured Artist on YouTube
- 2009 1st Runner up Kollaboration – The Shrine, Los Angeles, CA
- 2008 Best Recording Nominee – San Diego Music Awards, CA
- 2008 Winner of Kollaboration – Ford Amphiteatre, Los Angeles, CA
- 2007 Best of Performing Arts Nominee – San Diego/Los Angeles Asian Heritage Awards
- 2006 Best Female Performer and Best Keyboard Player – San Diego Honoring Acoustic Talent Awards
- 2006 Best of Performing Arts Nominee – San Diego/Los Angeles Asian Heritage Awards

== Reviews ==
Justin Roberts writes positively about Lui, describing her vocals as "sultry" and "candlelit". On Barkentine, the San Diego Troubadour notes the originality of her album.

For her performance of Below at Kollaboration 9 in Los Angeles, Ernie Hsiung describes Lui as a "...stand out performer..."
