= Archie Kao =

American actor

- 高聖遠
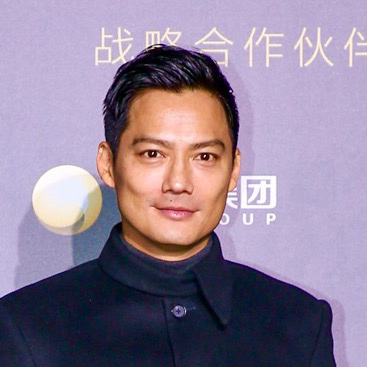
- Kao attending Esquire's Man of the Year event on December 13, 2016 in Beijing, China
- Born: Washington, D.C., U.S.
- Occupation: Actor
- Years active: 1994–present
- Spouse: Zhou Xun (m. 2014; div. 2020)

Chinese name
- Traditional Chinese: 高聖遠
- Simplified Chinese: 高圣远
Transcriptions
Standard Mandarin
- Hanyu Pinyin: Gāo Shèngyuǎn
- Wade–Giles: Kao^{1} Sheng^{4}-Yüan^{3}

Archie Kao (Chinese: 高聖遠) is an American actor and producer. He is best known to American audiences for series regulars roles on Chicago P.D., Power Rangers Lost Galaxy as well as long-running hit CSI: Crime Scene Investigation.

== Early life ==
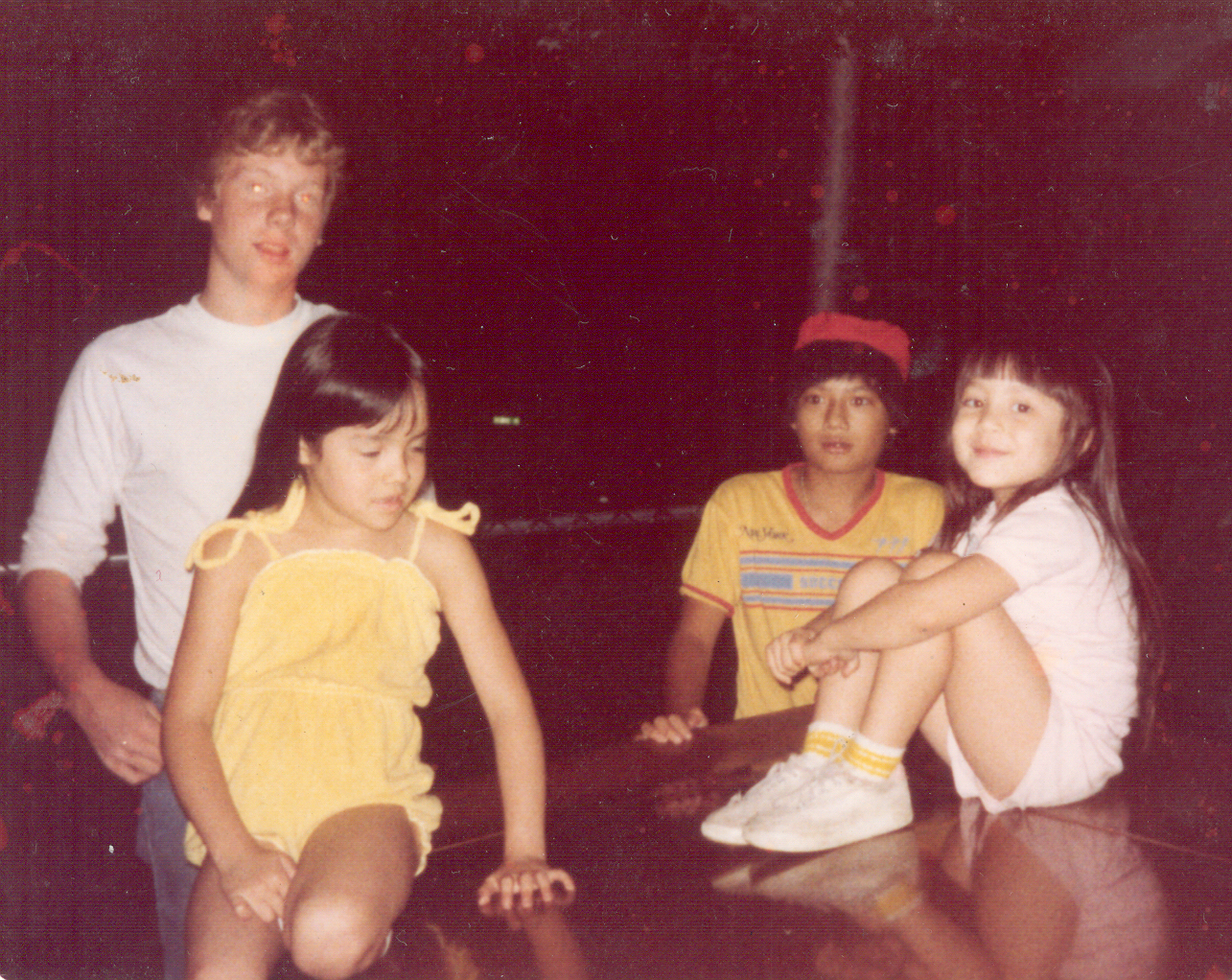
Kao in 1982 with his younger sisters and neighbor across the street in Alexandria, Virginia

Born in Washington, D.C., Kao grew up in the suburbs of Alexandria, Virginia. His parents are immigrants from Taiwan.

While attending George Mason University, Kao joined the Sigma Chi fraternity and graduated with a degree in Speech Communication in 1992. He was recognized as a Significant Sig by his fraternity in 2025, an honor bestowed upon members that have achieved high distinction in their fields.

As an undergraduate, Kao was elected Student Government President as well as the University's Homecoming King. He initially had plans to attend Law School and work in politics before becoming an actor.

Kao also speaks and understands Mandarin because he grew up in a bilingual household with two younger sisters but is more comfortable speaking in English, especially in interviews. He also studied French for six years.

He was named one of People's "Hottest Bachelors" in 2006. Kao currently divides his time between Los Angeles and Beijing.

== Career ==
=== Television ===
Through the early 2000s, Kao may have been best known for his role as Archie Johnson in the hit television series CSI: Crime Scene Investigation, as well as the role of Kai Chen, the Blue Ranger, in Power Rangers Lost Galaxy, later also providing additional voices in the Power Rangers franchise, voicing Liztwin in Power Rangers Lightspeed Rescue (in which he also reprised his role as Chen) and voicing General Venjix in Power Rangers Wild Force. He has also appeared on TV shows such as Desperate Housewives (as Steve), ER (as Yuri), NBC's Heroes, Century City, Huff (as Kane), Once and Again (as Steven), L.A. Firefighters (as Peter), Maybe This Time (as Takeshi) and more.

In 2013, Kao joined the cast of the NBC TV series Chicago P.D. (a spin-off from Chicago Fire) as a series regular, a character named Detective Sheldon Jin who is in charge of surveillance at the Chicago Police Department Intelligence Unit.

Kao shares his birthday with fellow Power Rangers actress Thuy Trang (1973–2001), who played the original Yellow Ranger, Trini Kwan, in Mighty Morphin Power Rangers from 1993 to 1994.

=== Film ===
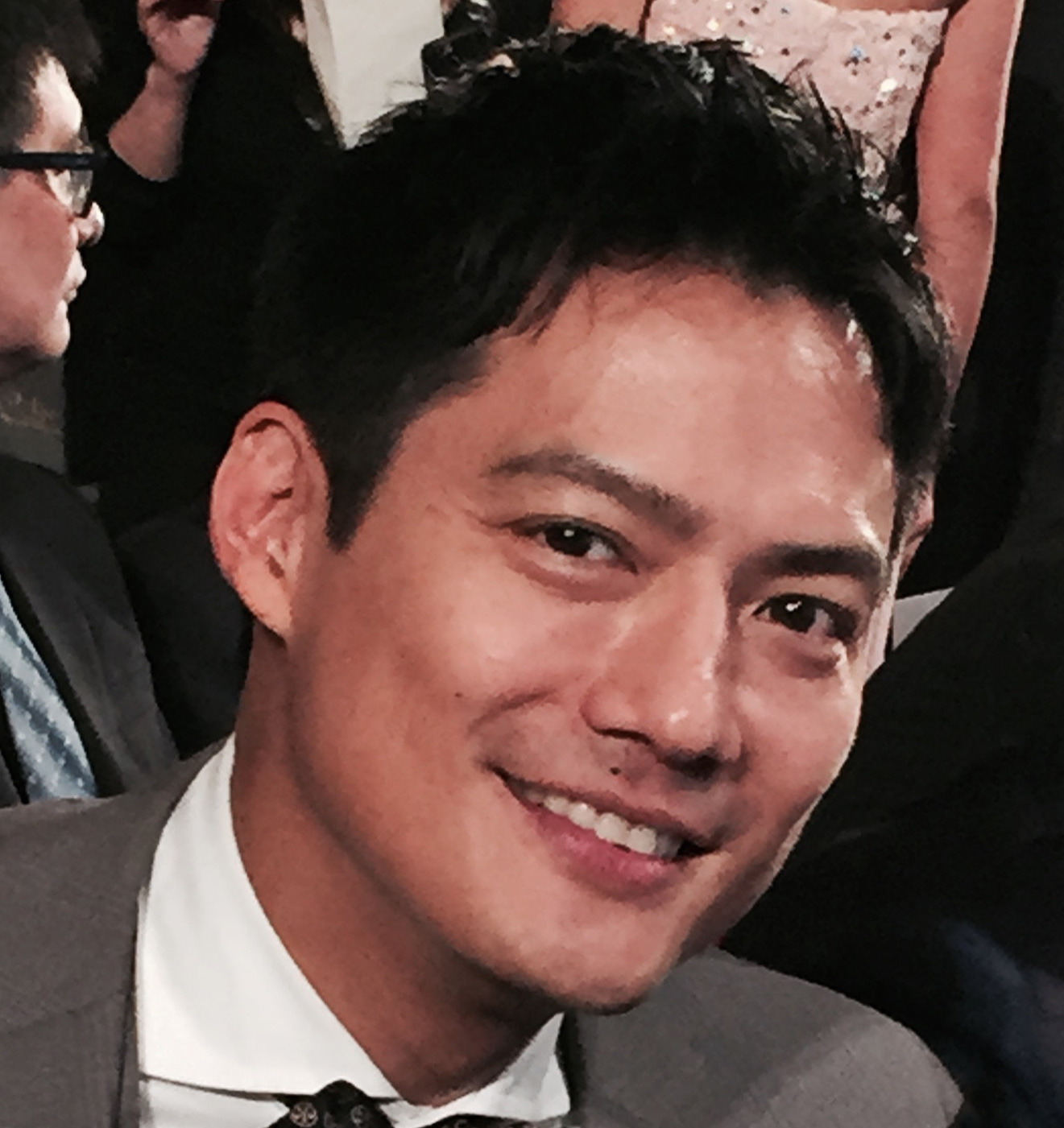
Kao at the 2015 Hong Kong Film Awards

Kao appeared as Sebastian in Wayne Wang's Snow Flower and the Secret Fan, and starred as the main romantic lead, Jefferson, in Quentin Lee's The People I've Slept With. Kao also played Edwin Luke, the brother of Keye Luke in Timothy Tau's short film bio-pic Keye Luke, which premiered at the 2012 Los Angeles Asian Pacific Film Festival and which was Closing Night Film of the inaugural 2013 Seattle Asian American Film Festival. Kao appeared in a 2014 Chinese film, The Deathday Party opposite Anita Yuen. It was shot in the ancient Chinese Alu Caves of Yunnan. Kao played Shum in Michael Mann's film Blackhat (2015). Kao has also had roles in films such as The Hills Have Eyes 2 (as Han), Nomad: The Warrior (as Shangrek), When In Rome (as Nobu), and Jet Li's The One (as Woo).

Kao provided the voice of Kenji in the videogame Need for Speed: Carbon.

Kao wrote, directed and produced a short film entitled Initiation (2011), which starred Ashley Bell and Kao's CSI co-star Marc Vann. The film is about an assassin trainee (Bell) who struggles with initiation day jitters under her mentor (Vann). Kao also produced and starred in a short film (as Jin) directed by Jerry Chan entitled Fast Money (2006).

In 2021, Kao starred in the holiday romance film Christmas at the Ranch with Amanda Righetti, Lindsay Wagner, Laur Allen and Dia Frampton playing the character Charles.

== Personal life ==
In May 2014, Chinese actress Zhou Xun posted a picture of Kao and herself on her team's Weibo account, announcing that they were dating. On July 16, Kao and Zhou were officially married on stage after a charity event in Hangzhou, China. On December 23, 2020, Zhou announced on her Sina Weibo account that they have divorced, to which Kao acknowledged a comment to her update.

== Filmography ==
=== Film ===
Year	Title	Role	Notes
1997	The Player	Intern	
2001	Thank Heaven	Sam Lee	
2001	The One	Woo	
2002	Purpose	Kiko	
2002	Local Boys	David Kamelamela	
2002	Against All Evidence	Minh Van Canh	
2002	When In Rome (V)	Nobu	
2006	Fast Money	Jin	
2006	Need for Speed: Carbon	Kenji	Video Game
2006	Nomad: The Warrior	Shangrek	
2007	The Hills Have Eyes 2	Han	
2008	The People I've Slept With	Jefferson	
2011	Snow Flower and the Secret Fan	Sebastian	
2012	Keye Luke	Edwin Luke	
2013	Love Speaks	Shaodong	
2014	The Deathday Party	Eric	
2015	Blackhat	Shum	
2015	Ulterior Motive	Ling Feng	
2016	Provoking Laughter		
2017	Into the Rainbow	Song	
2017	Legend of the Ancient Sword	Xie Yi	
2018	Dream Breaker	Nan Yan	
2021	Christmas at the Ranch		
2021	The Disappearance of Mrs. Wu	David Wu	
2025	Captain Tsunami	Gus	

=== Television ===
Year	Title	Role	Notes
1996	L.A. Firefighters	Peter	"Fuel and Spark" (Guest Appearance)
1996	Maybe This Time	Takeshi	"Break a Leg" (Guest Appearance)
1999	Power Rangers: Lost Galaxy	Kai Chen / Blue Galaxy Ranger	Main cast 45 episodes
1999	Once and Again	Steve / Steven	"The Past is Prologue" and "A Dream Deferred" (2009) (Recurring Role)
2000	Power Rangers Lightspeed Rescue	Kai Chen / Blue Galaxy Ranger / Liztwin	Voice, 3 episodes
2001–2012	CSI: Crime Scene Investigation	Archie Johnson	Recurring role (2001–2012), 100 episodes (Also in 1 episode as M.Blaze)
2002	Power Rangers Wild Force	General Venjix	Voice, Episode: "Forever Red"
2004	Huff	Kane	"That Fucking Cabin" (Guest Appearance)
2004	ER	Yuri	"Abby Normal" and "Just a Touch" (Recurring Role)
2004	Century City	Bartender	"To Know Her" (Guest Appearance)
2006	Heroes	Doctor	"Chapter Five 'Hiros'" (Guest Appearance)
2008	Desperate Housewives	Steve	"Hello, Little Girl" (Guest Appearance)
2014	Chicago P.D.	Detective Sheldon Jin	Main cast (Season 1)
2017	Fighter of the Destiny	Jin Yulü	Special appearance
2017	Nothing Gold Can Stay	Tu'er Dan	Special appearance
2017	My Dear Boy	Xiao Yeshi	Main Cast
2018	Love Is in the Air	Chu Tian Qi	Main Cast
2018	Never Gone	Xu Zhiheng	Special appearance
2020	The Flight Attendant	Ani's Client	"Other People's Houses"
2021	Breath of Destiny	Qiao XiangWan	Main Cast
2023	Rabbit Hole	Elliot Gao	Main Cast
2024	Interior Chinatown	Uncle Wong	Main Cast
