= Rags 2 Richmond =

2024 on-line musical drama series

Rags 2 Richmond is a digital short-form series set in Richmond, British Columbia, Canada. An ode to early 2000s hip-hop, R&B and Asian pop culture, Rags 2 Richmond tells a story of friendship, ambition, the hunt for fame and what goes on behind-the-scenes of an entertainment industry looking to cash in on young talent. The series is a musical dramedy, featuring singing and dancing performances.

== Plot ==
Nathan Song (Jonathan Wong), a struggling R&B singer, and his best friend, dancer Lando Wu (Peter Sudarso), dream of taking the music industry by storm. They create a new genre called ChiDM (China Dope Music) and prepare to launch the single "Low Key". However, a mysterious offer challenges their friendship. Meanwhile, a disgraced media mogul launches Richmond's first co‑ed beauty pageant, shedding light on the challenges faced by contestants in the entertainment scene.

== Format and release ==
- Number of episodes: 30
- Release batches: First release on December 5, 2024, second release on December 12, 2024, and third release on December 19, 2024
- Social Media Platforms: Instagram, YouTube, Facebook, TikTok, and Xiaohongshu (English name of app: "Red Note" or "Little Red Book").
- Views: The series garnered close to 10 million views within 3 weeks across all available platforms. Viral Nation head of programming Paul Telner points to Rags 2 Richmond as a “great example” of what can be achieved on social platforms. Within two months of release, Rags 2 Richmond was signed at Viral Nation.

== Feature film adaptation ==
The digital series is set to become a feature film, which will be directed by Vancouver’s TJ Gavel and written by Jonathan Wong, Patrick Do and Aaron Sprecher. Shot in Richmond, the film, like the series, will rely heavily on Hollywood North talent. A female lead, based on talent manager and producer Justina Shih, is being introduced in the feature film.

== Themes ==
The series explores identity, representation, and the resilience of chasing dreams, highlighting the challenges and triumphs of young talent in the Asian diaspora.

== Setting ==
Filming took place in several Richmond locations including Aberdeen Centre, Parker Place Mall and along River Road. Although the idea for the series began in Hong Kong and Los Angeles, production is entirely Canadian with 90 per cent of the cast and crew from Metro Vancouver. Many cast members are local talents, including current and former contestants of the Miss Chinese International Pageant, an annual event by Fairchild Television.

== Cast and creators ==
- Creators: Jonathan Wong, Justina Shih, and director Simon Yin
- Lead Cast: Jonathan Wong (Nathan), Peter Sudarso (Lando), with appearances from Hong Kong actress Nancy Sit, internet personality and comedian Davin Tong (Stage name: Peter Chao), Yasmine Ross, Leslie Kwan, Darren E. Scott, and more
- Writers: Simon Yin, Patrick Do, Aaron Sprecher, and Jonathan Wong
- Director: Simon Yin
- Creative Producer: Osric Chau
- Editor/ Post Producer: Dylan St. Aubin

== Music ==
The series theme song "LowKey" also launched in real life alongside the series, performed by Jonathan Wong. The series helped deliver the hit single Low Key, which had a life outside of the series and was performed by Wong last fall on the hit South Korean TV show Show! Music Core. Wong also recently headlined the Imagineland@Seoul festival.

In an interview about trends in production, Paul Telner, head of programming at Viral Nation, cited Rags 2 Richmond while discussing demand for new forms of social media content. He attributed the series' success to its production quality, which he compared to that of a major television series, as well as to its musical elements and distinctive early-2000s visual style.

== Streaming ==
With a free online release, the series offered audiences a glimpse into a uniquely Richmond story loosely inspired by the pageants that helped launch stars like Maggie Cheung and Fala Chen.

== Press ==
The series has been covered by Canada's Vancouver Sun, CTV Morning Live, CBC Radio, and Ming Pao Daily News; Korea's The Chosun Daily; Hong Kong's HK01; and Malaysia's Oriental Daily News.
