= Steve Nguyen =

American film director, producer and writer

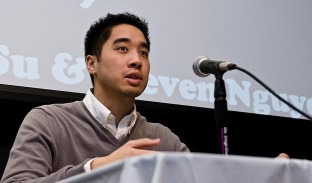
- Nguyen speaking at USC
- Born: December 30, 1985 (age 40); Torrance, California, U.S.
- Occupations: Film director; producer; screenwriter; artist; animator
- Musical career
- Genres: Lo-fi hip hop; jazz; downtempo; chill-out
- Instruments: Sampler, drum machine, keyboard
- Label: Studio APA
- Website: steve-nguyen.com

Steve Nguyen (born December 30, 1985) is an American director, writer, artist and music producer. Nguyen and fellow director Choz Belen formed Studio APA, a multimedia collective that specializes in the production of animated films, children's books and music.

== Career ==
=== Films ===
From 2001 to 2005, Nguyen has made appearances as a young actor on films and network television programs such as Las Vegas, Scrubs, Freaks and Geeks, Are You Afraid of the Dark? and The Man Show. He worked as a production assistant at Universal Pictures on Jarhead and The Fast and The Furious: Tokyo Drift.

In 2009, Nguyen directed and produced a short documentary film titled "The Making of a Memoir" in collaboration with Vietnamese author Lac Su to promote his HarperCollins published memoir, I Love Yous Are For White People. The documentary helped Su gain national exposure and has been featured on CNN, NPR, the Saigon Broadcasting Television Network, and KSCI.

Nguyen directed and produced an animated film, Hibakusha, which chronicles the early life of Hiroshima atomic bomb survivor, Kaz Suyeishi. The film stars Karin Anna Cheung, Connie Lim, Daisuke Suzuki, Jane Lui and William Frederick Knight as the lead voice actors. The film was dedicated to the American Society of Hiroshima-Nagasaki A-Bomb Survivors in an effort to spread awareness for nuclear disarmament and was completed on the 67th anniversary of the Hiroshima atomic bombing, August 6, 2012. Nguyen and the Studio APA crew have toured with Hibakusha throughout the United States since October 2012, and the film has been screened at the Japanese American National Museum, Vietnamese International Film Festival, Wing Luke Museum in Seattle, Dragon Con in Atlanta, University of Michigan, UCLA, UC Irvine, UC San Diego, San Diego State University, UC Davis, UC Riverside, DisOrient Film Festival, University of Wisconsin–La Crosse, and California State University, Fullerton. Hibakusha received the Special Achievement Award and Best Animated Short in 2013 at the International Uranium Film Festival held in Rio de Janeiro.

In association with the nuclear disarmament campaign, Global Zero, Nguyen hosted a travel documentary segment titled "Hiroshima Revisited" as a follow-up effort to commemorate the 68th anniversary of the Hiroshima atomic bombing.

=== Illustration and books ===
In June 2020, Nguyen released his first children's book with Skyhorse Publishing and Simon and Schuster titled To Baby From Daddy, which features his own illustrations and personal composition of paternal love and advice to his baby daughter.

== Online media ==
Along with Kevin Hsieh, Nguyen was the co-founder of ChannelAPA.com, a defunct online news source that started in 2008 that posted current news updates and video interviews about Asian Americans in mainstream/independent media. According to KoreAm Magazine and Myx TV, it was featured as one of the top Asian American news sources to follow. In November 2012, Nguyen and Belen launched a multi-media creative collective called Studio APA that serves as both a film production and dedicated YouTube channel.

In 2010, Nguyen directed YouTube singer-songwriter Megan Lee's music video for her first official single, "Love, Laugh, & Live".

On February 4, 2013, Nguyen produced and released a short film with The Jubilee Project and Jeremy Lin titled "The Last Pick," which can be viewed on Lin's personal YouTube channel. In November 2013, it was announced on Allkpop that Nguyen and Korean hip-hop artists, Tiger JK and Yoon Mi-rae, have collaborated on an animated music video for their single, "Turn It Up", which is featured on CHOPS' upcoming album, Strength in Numbers. The full version of the music video was released on January 15, 2014.

On April 18, 2014, Nguyen, Belen, and Queens-based rapper Awkwafina released an animated lyric video for her single, 'Flu Shot', off of her Yellow Ranger debut album.

On September 28, 2015, Nguyen premiered a collaboration project with the global campaign, A World at School, titled, R I S E, at The Town Hall in New York City. In association with Christian hip hop artist Lecrae and the help of Theirworld founder Sarah Brown, the project was created to raise awareness and to pressure governments to act on providing universal education across the globe. Since early 2015, he has served as a Global Ambassador to the nonprofit, Theirworld, to help bring awareness to the cause and share global youth stories through graphic novelization.

Nguyen and Belen collaborated with Los Angeles electro-pop band, Mansions on the Moon, to produce a music video for their upcoming single, "Heart of the Moment". The project was released in October 2015.

In January 2017, Studio APA released the animated visuals for K-pop star Ailee's US debut, "Fall Back", via Vevo in conjunction with Westside Entertainment.

On January 23, 2020, Nguyen released a personal short animated documentary on his Facebook account titled Blast Burn that deals with the miscarriage of his son.

== Discography ==
=== Studio albums ===
Title	Album details
Singularity	Released: February 2, 2022; Label: Studio APA (U.S.); Format: CD, LP, Digital download, streaming

=== Extended plays ===
Title	EP details
Bali	Released: July 11, 2021; Label: Studio APA (U.S.); Format: Digital download, streaming
Inflorescent	Released: March 11, 2022; Label: Studio APA (U.S.); Format: Digital download, streaming
Space Out	Released: December 9, 2022; Label: Tangerina Music (Brazil); Format: Digital download, streaming
Senses	Released: September 4, 2023; Label: Slowdown Records (Italy); Format: Digital download, streaming
Aqua Stellar	Released: March 28, 2025; Label: Studio APA / Chill Azure (IUK); Format: Digital download, streaming
Loong Way Home	Released: April 24, 2026; Label: Studio APA / Chill Azure (IUK); Format: Digital download, streaming

== Filmography ==
=== Film ===
Year	Title	Credits	Notes	Ref
2005	The Fast and the Furious: Tokyo Drift	Script coordinator		
2005	Noah's Arc	Post-production coordinator	Assisting Editor	
2005	Code Monkeys	Writing assistant		
2008	The Making of a Memoir	Director	Producer & Writer	
2009	Party Down	Production coordinator		
2010	Kill Joy (short film)	Producer		
2010	Dilated (short film)	Producer		
2012	Hibakusha	Director	Producer & Writer	
2012	Raskal Love	Producer		
2013	The Last Pick	Producer		
2013	Hiroshima Revisited	Producer	Host & Narrator	
2014	Dark House	Producer		
2020	Blast Burn (short film)	Director	Producer & Writer	

=== Music videos ===
Year	Title	Artist	Director	Other	Notes	Ref.
2011	"Diamond Bars"	David A. Romero		Yes	Director of photography	
2011	"Love, Laugh & Live"	Megan Lee	Yes	Yes	Director of photography	
2014	"Turn It Up"	CHOPS, Tiger JK and Yoon Mi-rae	Yes		Co-directed with Choz Belen	
2014	Flu Shot	Awkwafina	Yes		Co-directed with Choz Belen	
2015	R I S E	Lecrae	Yes		Co-directed with Choz Belen	
2015	Heart of the Moment	Mansions on the Moon	Yes		Co-directed with Choz Belen	
2017	Fall Back	Ailee	Yes		Co-directed with Choz Belen	
2021	Lonely Whale	Steve Nguyen	Yes			
2021	Bali	Steve Nguyen	Yes			
2022	Stella	Steve Nguyen	Yes			
2023	Shelly	Steve Nguyen	Yes			
2024	Lovercraft	Steve Nguyen, [ocean jams]	Yes			
2025	Twilight	Steve Nguyen	Yes			

== Publications ==
- Steve Nguyen (2020). To Baby, From Daddy: A Love Letter from a Father to a Daughter. New York: Simon & Schuster. ISBN 978-1510745995.
