= Mei Melançon =

American actress

- Born: March 3, 1980 (age 46); Manila, Philippines
- Occupations: Actress, writer, director, producer, model

Meiling "Mei" Melançon (Japanese: 明依) (born March 3, 1980) is an American actress, screenwriter and former fashion model. She has appeared in feature films as well as indie productions, television shows, and more than 100 commercials as a model and actress. She has also worked as screenwriter and producer.

== Early life ==
Melançon was born in Manila, Philippines. She left at the age of 2, and was raised in mainly Japan, Hong Kong and Korea. She is of Chinese and Japanese descent through her father, and French descent through her mother. As a child she traveled throughout Asia and Europe. At the age of five her mother taught her how to play the guitar, and she was later in a children's band called Blossoms. In an interview with Giant Robot editor Eric Nakamura, Mei spoke about her non-traditional strict upbringing. She was not allowed to watch most films and television, only classics and that they were not allowed to listen to popular music due to religious reasons.

== Career ==
=== Actor ===
Melançon started acting in 2003. She was at that time a successful model and was signed to Wilhelmina Modeling Agency. She appeared on season two of Legends of Tomorrow as "Masako Yamashiro". Melançon also appeared in the final season of The L Word as recurring character "Jamie Chen", as Psylocke in X-Men: The Last Stand, as "Miyu" (Kevin Spacey's assistant) in Shrink, as Lynda in the HK-shot film Irreversi, as Dr. Catherine Ivy in the psychological thriller/horror film Pathology (with Milo Ventimiglia), and as the other "Girl in the Car" along with Maggie Q in Rush Hour 2 when she was still modeling.

Melançon also starred as Lotus Long in the short film bio-pic Keye Luke, which premiered at the 2012 Los Angeles Asian Pacific Film Festival and which was Closing Night Film of the inaugural 2013 Seattle Asian American Film Festival. She starred in Blumenthal where she played Scottish actor Brian Cox's niece, and the film made its premiere in 2013 at the Santa Barbara International Film Festival.

=== Writer, producer, director ===
Melançon co-wrote the thriller American Romance in 2014. She has also co-written a short film entitled "Stephany + Me", with Ben Duhl, co-starring Tara Summers, directed by Peter Shanel. She produced and starred in a PSA written by comedian Todd Glass that has been covered by The Huffington Post, Perez Hilton among other news outlets. Melançon has also written articles for Giant Robot Magazine.

== Filmography ==
=== Film ===
Year	Movie	Role
2001	Double Take	La Perla model
2001	Rush Hour 2	Girl in Car
2006	X-Men: The Last Stand	Psylocke
2007	Irreversi	Lynda
2007	Loaded	Rose
2008	Pathology	Catherine Ivy
2008	Fold	Maki
2009	The Truth About Angels	Mei
2009	Shrink	Miyu
2012	Shockwave: Darkside 3D'	The Machine
2012	Blumenthal	Christina
2012	Keye Luke	Lotus Long
2015	American Romance	Agent Tores / Screenwriter
2018	Higher Power	Ms. Sabi

=== Television ===
Year	Television Show	Role
2004	CSI: Crime Scene Investigation	Vanessa Green
2005	Deadwood	Chinese slavewhore
2006	Kitchen Confidential	Beautiful patron
2009	The L Word	Jamie Chen
2010	Private Practice	Elena Stone
2016	Legends of Tomorrow	Masako Yamashiro
