= Becky Wu =

American actress

Becky Wu is an American actress of film, television and the stage. She plays the recurring character Amy Yamada on multiple episodes of Desperate Housewives, and Jan Carnes on Greek. She has also appeared on TV shows such as The Young and the Restless, Eleventh Hour, Dollhouse, Ghost Whisperer, Hawthorne (as Nurse Becky), All My Children, General Hospital, Love That Girl! (as Zoe Chung) and more.

She has also appeared in various independent film projects, such as Julia on the web series KTown Cowboys, Directed by Daniel DPD Park, as Florence Ung in Timothy Tau's short film bio-pic Keye Luke, as Monica in Duno Tran's "Bathroom Battle Royale" (which she also served as a Producer on) and as Scarlett alongside Robert Factor in Lillian Ng's "Pleasures." She is also friends with radio personality Gina Grad, and has been a contributor to the Pretty Good Podcast show.
