= Daisuke Suzuki =

Daisuke Suzuki may refer to:

- Daisuke Suzuki (footballer) (鈴木 大輔, born 1990), Japanese footballer
- Daisuke Suzuki (musician) (鈴木 大輔, born 1978), Japanese musician
- Daisuke Suzuki (actor) (鈴木 大介, born 1972), Japanese actor and voice actor
- Daisuke Suzuki (shogi) (鈴木 大介, born 1974), Japanese shogi player
