= American Romance =

American Romantic
- Theatrical release poster
- Directed by: Zackary Adler
- Screenplay by: Wes Laurie; Meiling Melançon
- Story by: Gary Sugarman
- Produced by: Crawford Anderson-Dillon; Roger M. Mayer; Gary Sugarman
- Starring: Daveigh Chase; Nolan Gerard Funk
- Cinematography: Ian S. Takahashi
- Edited by: Phil Norden
- Music by: Mark Leggett
- Distributed by: Gravitas Ventures
- Release date: October 23, 2016
- Running time: 86 minutes
- Country: United States
- Language: English

American Romance is a 2016 American thriller film directed by Zackary Adler and starring Daveigh Chase (in her final film role before her death in 2026) and Nolan Gerard Funk.

== Plot ==
After their car breaks down in the middle of nowhere, two young newlyweds unknowingly encounter a trucker serial killer being tracked by an FBI agent and a retired sheriff.

== Cast ==
- Daveigh Chase as Krissy Madison
- Nolan Gerard Funk as Jeff Madison
- John Savage as Emery Reed
- Meiling Melançon as Denice Torres
- James Duval as Stewart Miles
- Diane Farr as Brenda Reed
- Mark Boone Junior as Hank
- Barlow Jacobs as Ricky Stern
- Sofia Mali as Young Krissy

== Reception ==
Dann Gire of the Daily Herald gave the film a negative review, describing it as "dull and just plain icky."
