= Keye Luke (film) =

- Directed by: Timothy Tau
- Written by: Timothy Tau; Ed Moy
- Produced by: Timothy Tau
- Starring: Feodor Chin; Kelvin Han Yee; Archie Kao; David Huynh; Mei Melancon; Jessika Van; Elaine Kao; Ina-Alice Kopp; Becky Wu; Cynthia San Luis; James Huang
- Music by: George Shaw (Best Original Score, Asians on Film Festival)
- Production company: Firebrand Hand Creative
- Release date: May 13, 2012
- Running time: 12 minutes
- Country: United States
- Language: English

Keye Luke is a 2012 American short film directed by Timothy Tau, written by Timothy Tau, Ed Moy and Feodor Chin, and produced by Timothy Tau.

== Synopsis ==
The short film is a documentary and narrative hybrid bio-pic focusing on the earlier life and work of Keye Luke during the 1920s-1940s, a pioneering Asian American actor and painter most known for his roles as the Number One Son, Lee Chan, in the popular Charlie Chan films of the 1930s, and as the very first Kato in the 1940s Green Hornet, decades before Bruce Lee. Luke shares a hometown with Lee (Seattle, Washington) and has several other similarities with Lee as well. Luke also played Detective James Lee Wong in the Phantom of Chinatown (1940), taking over the role of "Mr. Wong" (played by Boris Karloff) and becoming the first leading Asian American detective character in U.S. cinematic history. This role is covered in the film, as well as Luke's work in films such as Secret Agent X-9. Feodor Chin plays Keye Luke, Archie Kao plays Edwin Luke, the brother of Keye Luke, and Kelvin Han Yee plays Lee Luke, Keye Luke's father. Other actors play various real-life historical figures that were Luke's colleagues or family members, such as Elizabeth Sandy playing Luke's wife, Ethel Davis Luke.

== Cast ==
- Feodor Chin as Keye Luke
- Archie Kao as Edwin Luke
- Kelvin Han Yee as Lee Luke
- Mei Melancon as Lotus Long
- Elaine Kao as Marianne Quon/Lai Yee
- Jolene Kim as Suzanna Kim
- David Huynh as Benson Fong
- Britt Prentice as Warner Oland (Charlie Chan segment)
- Robert Factor as Sidney Toler (Charlie Chan segment)
- Burl Moseley as Mantan Moreland (Charlie Chan segment)
- Becky Wu as Florence Ung (Charlie Chan segment)
- James Huang as Victor Sen Yung (Charlie Chan segment)
- Jennifer Chang as Iris Wong (Charlie Chan segment)
- Hedy Wong as Frances Chan (Charlie Chan segment)
- Elizabeth Sandy as Ethel Davis Luke
- Timothy Tau as James Wong Howe
- Chris Cusano as Gordon Jones (Britt Reid/The Green Hornet) (Green Hornet segment)
- Cynthia San Luis as Lenore "Casey" Case (Green Hornet segment)
- Jessika Van as Nabura/Victoria Horne (Secret Agent X-9 segment)
- Narisa Suzuki as Takahari (Secret Agent X-9 segment)
- Jennifer Field as Dr. Raymond (Secret Agent X-9 segment)
- Chadd Stoops as Lloyd Bridges (Secret Agent X-9 segment)
- Ina-Alice Kopp as Jan Wiley (Secret Agent X-9 segment)
- Louie Yee (bulldog actor) as Louie "Guai Low" Luke

== Production ==
The film was initially made under a Visual Communications "Armed With A Camera" Fellowship for Emerging Media Artists, and a five-minute abbreviated version premiered at the 2012 Los Angeles Asian Pacific Film Festival. Many questions about the film's production are also answered in an extensive and in-depth Q&A done by the film's co-writer Ed Moy with director Timothy Tau.

== Awards and Screenings ==
=== Awards ===
The film won an Audience Award for best narrative short at a February 2014 monthly screening of the 2014 HollyShorts Film Festival. The film also won a "Best Original Score" award for George Shaw's music, and also an Honorable Mention award for Best Ensemble Cast from the 2013 Asians on Film Festival. The film has also been nominated for Best Documentary by the Dragon Con Film Festival.

=== Screenings ===
The film has also screened at over a dozen film festivals worldwide, including the Los Angeles Asian Pacific Film Festival, the Asian American International Film Festival in New York, the HollyShorts Film Festival, the Dragon Con Independent Film Festival in Atlanta, Georgia, the Gen Con Indy Film Festival in Indianapolis, Indiana, the Boston Asian American Film Festival, the DisOrient Asian American Film Festival of Oregon, the Austin Asian American Film Festival, the ASEAN International Film Festival and Awards in Malaysia, and the 2013 Seattle Asian American Film Festival, where it was the Closing Night film.

The film also screened at a University of Washington event in May to honor Asian Pacific American Heritage Month, alongside other films such as Aoki (a documentary on activist Richard Aoki by Ben Wang and Michael Chang) and Anna May Wong: In Her Own Words directed by Yunah Hong.

The film also can be viewed online at DramaFever.

=== Reception ===
Film Threat said that the film was "a quality short film, period" and "a mix of stage play, Hollywood re-enactment and historical lesson." The London Film Review has stated that the film was "an entertaining, informative and fun short film" and a "brief, well constructed and poignant look at an actor at a certain period of his life," also adding that "a lot of film biographies could learn useful lessons from this short." Rogue Cinema also commented that the film is "a glorious short made with depth and passion" and "a fabulous cinematic experience [that] should be mandatory viewing for all Cinephiles." The film's trailer was also featured on Twitch and /Film.

The film and filmmaker Timothy Tau were also profiled in Seattle Metropolitan Magazine when the film was the Closing Night film of the 2013 Seattle Asian American Film Festival.

== Future plans ==
Tau has plans on extending the short film into a feature film about Keye Luke and other pioneering Asian American actors of his generation including Sessue Hayakawa, Anna May Wong and Philip Ahn.
