= Karin Anna Cheung =

American actress

Anna Cheung
- Chinese: 張嘉琳; pinyin: Zhāng Jiālín
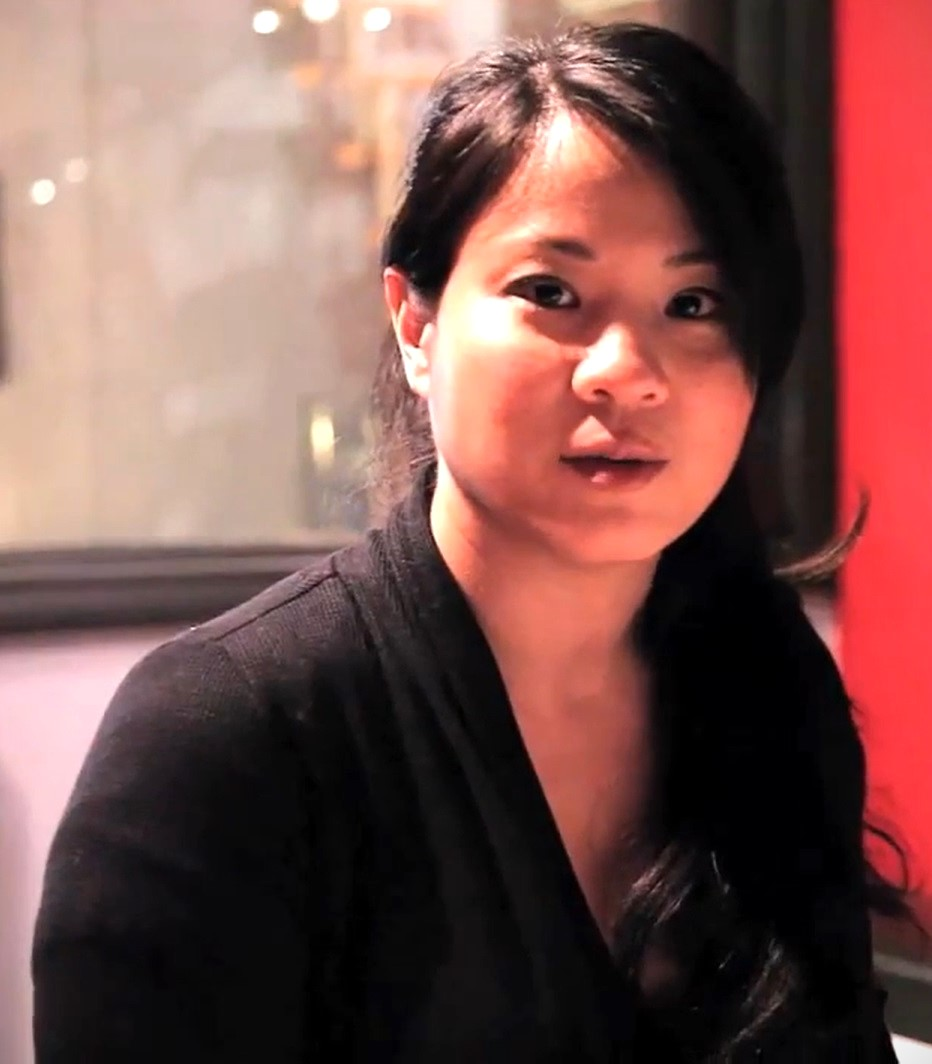
- Cheung in 2012
- Born: Karin Anna Cheung; November 2, 1974 (age 51); Los Angeles, California, U.S.
- Education: California State University, Northridge (BA)
- Occupations: Actress, singer-songwriter, artist
- Years active: 2001–present
- Known for: Lead actress in Better Luck Tomorrow (2002)

Karin Anna Cheung (born November 2, 1974) is an American actress, singer, songwriter, and artist.

== Early life and education ==
In 1998, Cheung graduated from California State University, Northridge, with a degree in art.

== Career ==
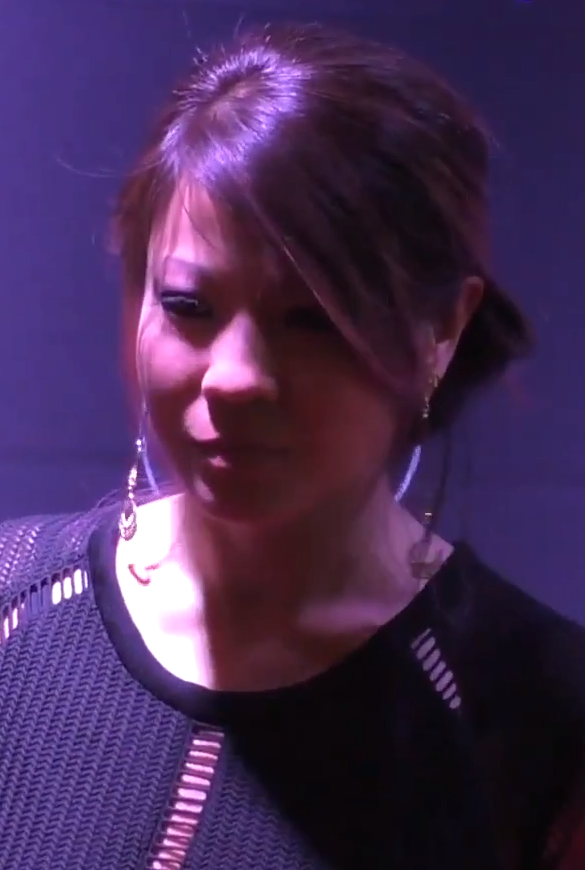
Cheung in 2016

Cheung's first audition for feature films landed her the female lead role as Stephanie Vandergosh in Better Luck Tomorrow (2002) directed by Justin Lin. She also played the lead, Angela, in Quentin Lee's feature film The People I've Slept With (2009). On January 20, 2009, Cheung performed at Barack Obama's inauguration as president. In 2012, Cheung voiced the lead role of Kaz Suyeishi in the animated short film Hibakusha, directed by Steve Nguyen and Choz Belen. Cheung also appeared in Quentin Lee's horror film, The Unbidden, alongside Michelle Krusiec, Tamlyn Tomita, and Julia Nickson-Soul.

== Filmography ==
Film work by Karin Anna Cheung
Year	Title	Role	Notes
2002	Better Luck Tomorrow	Stephanie Vandergosh	
2006	Drake & Josh Go Hollywood	Flight Attendant	Television film
2006	Abominable	C. J.	
2009	The People I've Slept With	Angela	
2012	Hibakusha	Kaz Suyeishi	Voice
2016	The Unbidden	Young Anna	
2017	Rice on White	Robin	
