= Psylocke in other media =

Appearances of Marvel Comics character

Adaptations of Psylocke in other media
- Artwork of Psylocke by Capcom artist CRMK for the fighting game Marvel vs. Capcom 2: New Age of Heroes
- Original source: Comics published by Marvel Comics
- First appearance: Captain Britain #8 (December 1976)

Print publications
- Novel(s): X2

Films and television
- Film(s): X-Men: Apocalypse; Deadpool & Wolverine
- Television show(s): X-Men: The Animated Series; Wolverine and the X-Men; X-Men '97

Psylocke, a character appearing in American comic books published by Marvel Comics, has been adapted in various forms of media, including films, television series, and video games. She most commonly appears in X-Men-related media characterized as Betsy Braddock while her mind was in Kwannon's body, or adapted as a British-Asian coded character without an explicitly-defined identity. The character has been portrayed in film by Olivia Munn in X-Men: Apocalypse, while Tasha Simms, Grey DeLisle, Erica Lindbeck, and Naoko Mori, among others, have voiced her in animation and video games.

== Television ==
- Psylocke appears in X-Men: The Animated Series, voiced by Tasha Simms.
- Psylocke appears in X-Men '97, voiced by Naoko Mori. She appears in cameos during season 1, and joins Cable's X-Force team in season 2.
- Psylocke appears in the Wolverine and the X-Men episode "Time Bomb", voiced by Grey DeLisle. This version is a telepath member of the Brotherhood of Mutants whose powers manifest via a butterfly-shaped aura around her head. She is East Asian in appearance and speaks with a British accent.

== Film ==
Olivia Munn as Psylocke (right) in X-Men: Apocalypse

- An unidentified mutant loosely based on Psylocke appears in X-Men: The Last Stand, portrayed by Meiling Melançon. This version is a member of the Omegas with shadow-based teleportation powers who joins forces with Magneto's Brotherhood. According to writer Zak Penn, Melançon's character was not referred to as "Psylocke" in the original script: "There was some switching of character names later in production, and I'm not exactly sure how Psylocke got thrown into the mix."
- A young Psylocke makes a cameo appearance in X-Men Origins: Wolverine, portrayed by an uncredited actress.
- Psylocke appears in X-Men: Apocalypse, portrayed by Olivia Munn. This version is an Asian-American mutant with psionic abilities and a member of Apocalypse's Horsemen. Munn trained in gymnastics, taekwondo and sword-fighting, underwent a special diet, and became a black belt in preparation for the role. Munn also performed most of her own stunts, with stunt actress Julia Rekaikyna providing additional stunt work.
- An alternate timeline variant of Psylocke appears in Deadpool & Wolverine, portrayed by an uncredited Ayesha Hussain.

== Video games ==
- Betsy Braddock as Psylocke, in her original body, appears as a playable character in X-Men II: The Fall of the Mutants.
- Betsy Braddock as Psylocke appears as a non-player character in Wolverine.
- Betsy Braddock as Psylocke appears as a playable character in X-Men: Mutant Apocalypse.
- Betsy Braddock as Psylocke appears as a playable character in X-Men 2: Clone Wars.
- Betsy Braddock as Psylocke appears as a playable character in X-Men: Children of the Atom, voiced by Catherine Disher.
- Betsy Braddock as Psylocke appears as a playable character in Marvel Super Heroes, voiced again by Catherine Disher.
- Betsy Braddock as Psylocke was meant to appear as a playable character in Sega's X-Women before it was cancelled.
- Betsy Braddock as Psylocke makes a cameo appearance in X-Men vs. Street Fighter via Cammy's ending.
- Clones of Betsy Braddock / Psylocke appear in X-Men: The Ravages of Apocalypse.
- Betsy Braddock as Psylocke appears as an assist character in Marvel vs. Capcom: Clash of Super Heroes.
- Betsy Braddock as Psylocke appears as a playable character in Marvel vs. Capcom 2: New Age of Heroes, voiced again by Catherine Disher.
- Betsy Braddock as Psylocke appears as an unlockable playable character in X-Men: Mutant Academy 2, voiced by Jane Luk.
- Betsy Braddock as Psylocke appears as a playable character in X-Men: Next Dimension, voiced by Masasa Moyo.
- Betsy Braddock as Psylocke appears as a playable character in X-Men Legends, voiced again by Masasa Moyo. This version is an associate of the X-Men.
- Betsy Braddock as Psylocke appears as a mini-boss in Marvel: Ultimate Alliance, voiced by Kim Mai Guest. Additionally, a brainwashed version of Braddock called "Dark Psylocke" appears as a thrall of Doctor Doom.
- Betsy Braddock as Psylocke appears as a playable character in Marvel: Ultimate Alliance 2, voiced by Kimberly Brooks. She initially appears as a playable character in the n-Space version of the game before becoming a downloadable character in the Vicarious Visions and Windows versions of the game. Furthermore, her default design is based on her 1990s ninja uniform and sports the Crimson Dawn mark on her eye while her "House of M" design appears as an alternate skin.
- Betsy Braddock as Psylocke appears as a playable character in Marvel Super Hero Squad Online, voiced by Laura Bailey.
- Betsy Braddock as Psylocke appears as an unlockable character in Marvel Avengers Alliance.
- Betsy Braddock as Psylocke appears as an assist character in Marvel vs. Capcom Origins.
- Betsy Braddock as Psylocke appears in Marvel: War of Heroes.
- Betsy Braddock as Psylocke appears as an unlockable playable character in Marvel Heroes, voiced by April Stewart. Additionally, her Uncanny X-Men and Uncanny X-Force designs appear as alternate skins.
- Betsy Braddock as Psylocke appears in Deadpool, voiced by Melissa Disney. This version is a member of the X-Men.
- Betsy Braddock as Psylocke appears in Lego Marvel Super Heroes, voiced again by Laura Bailey.
- Betsy Braddock as Psylocke appears as a playable character in Marvel Puzzle Quest.
- Betsy Braddock as Psylocke appears in X-Men: Battle of the Atom (2014).
- Betsy Braddock as Psylocke and Captain Britain appear as separate playable characters in Marvel Contest of Champions.
- Betsy Braddock as Psylocke and Captain Britain appear as separate playable characters in Marvel Future Fight.
- Betsy Braddock as Psylocke appears as a playable character in Marvel Strike Force.
- Betsy Braddock as Psylocke appears as a playable character in Marvel Ultimate Alliance 3: The Black Order, voiced by Erica Lindbeck.
- Betsy Braddock as Psylocke, based on her 1990s Jim Lee design, appears in Marvel Super War. Additionally, her ResurrXion design appears as an alternate skin.
- Betsy Braddock as Psylocke appears in Marvel Snap.
- Betsy Braddock as Psylocke appears as a purchasable outfit in Fortnite Battle Royale.
- An alternative universe variant of Psylocke named Sai, voiced by Alpha Takahashi in English, appears in Marvel Rivals. Her classic ninja costume, labeled "Psylocke Vengeance", can be purchased in the game store as an alternative skin, while her "Retro X-Uniform" is featured in the season two battle pass.

== Miscellaneous ==
- Betsy Braddock as Psylocke appears in the novel trilogy X-Men: The Chaos Engine. After Doctor Doom obtains the titular engine, a flawed Cosmic Cube, and rewrites reality, Braddock is rewritten to become an aspiring singer dating Warren Worthington III until she learns the truth behind the alterations, partially regains her memories, and joins a group of X-Men who were unaffected by the changes in traveling to the Starlight Citadel before Magneto and the Red Skull obtain the chaos engine and create their own realities. While attempting to escape the latter's reality, Braddock encounters its version of Worthington, fully regains her memories, and defeats Doom before he can seize the citadel before helping the X-Men defeat the Red Skull.
- Psylocke appears in the Wolverine versus Sabretooth motion comic, voiced by Heather Doerksen.

== See also ==
- X-Men in other media
