= The People I've Slept With =

2009 film by Quentin Lee

- Film poster
- Directed by: Quentin Lee
- Written by: Koji Steven Sakai
- Produced by: Koji Steven Sakai; Quentin Lee; Stanley Yung; Executive producers: Tien Lee; Sam Kwok; Brian Yang
- Starring: Karin Anna Cheung; Wilson Cruz; Archie Kao; Lynn Chen; James Shigeta; Cathy Shim; Chris Zylka; Randall Park; Rane Jameson
- Cinematography: Quyen Tran
- Edited by: Aldo Velasco
- Music by: Steven Pranoto
- Production companies: Margin Films; 408 Films
- Release date: October 2009 (São Paulo International Film Festival)
- Running time: 86 minutes
- Country: United States
- Language: English

The People I've Slept With is a 2009 American sex comedy film directed by Quentin Lee.

== Plot ==
Angela Yang (Karin Anna Cheung) is a young woman who enjoys sex and has had a number of partners. As mementos, she photographs her lovers and gives each of them a nickname.

When she finds out she's pregnant, she decides to keep the baby. She then sets out to locate the five men who might be the father and decide if she can have a more permanent relationship with any of them.

== Cast ==
- Karin Anna Cheung as Angela
- Wilson Cruz as Gabriel
- Archie Kao as Jefferson
- Lynn Chen as Juliet
- James Shigeta as Charles Yang
- Rane Jameson as Lawrence
- Randall Park as Carlton Kim
- Stacie Leah Rippy as Becky
- Danny Vasquez as Ron Guzman
- Chris Zylka as Alex Flynn
- Rylan Williams as Preston
- Dana Lee as Mr. Lee
- Elizabeth Sung as Mrs. Lee
- Cathy Shim as Nikki
- Perry Smith as Mrs. Robinson

== Reception ==
=== Critical response ===
Review aggregator Rotten Tomatoes gives the film a rating of 27% based on 11 reviews, with an average rating of 5.5/10. Film critic Frank Scheck of the Associated Press wrote in his review for The Hollywood Reporter: "Largely devoid of the sex-farce style comic wit to which it aspires, the film is palatable largely because of the charm of lead actress Cheung, who manages to make her character appealing even while she's behaving in a manner that would embarrass the horny male teens in the American Pie movies."

=== Release ===
The People I've Slept With was released in October 2009 at the São Paulo International Film Festival. The film was released on DVD on March 22, 2011, by Maya Films.
