= Kelvin Han Yee =

American actor (born 1961)

- Born: June 14, 1961 (age 65); San Francisco, California, U.S.
- Occupation: Actor
- Years active: 1993–present

Kelvin Han Yee (born June 14, 1961) is an American actor of Asian descent. His career spans over 30 years of film, television and theater.

As a teenager, Yee became involved with the pioneering work of Asian American Theater Company. He was an original member of San Francisco's The National Theater Of The Deranged and San Francisco Mime Troupe. He was a member of the acting company at American Conservatory Theater for six seasons. He has acted with Berkeley Repertory Theatre, Huntington Theatre Company, East West Players, Mark Taper Forum and Lodestone Theatre Ensemble.

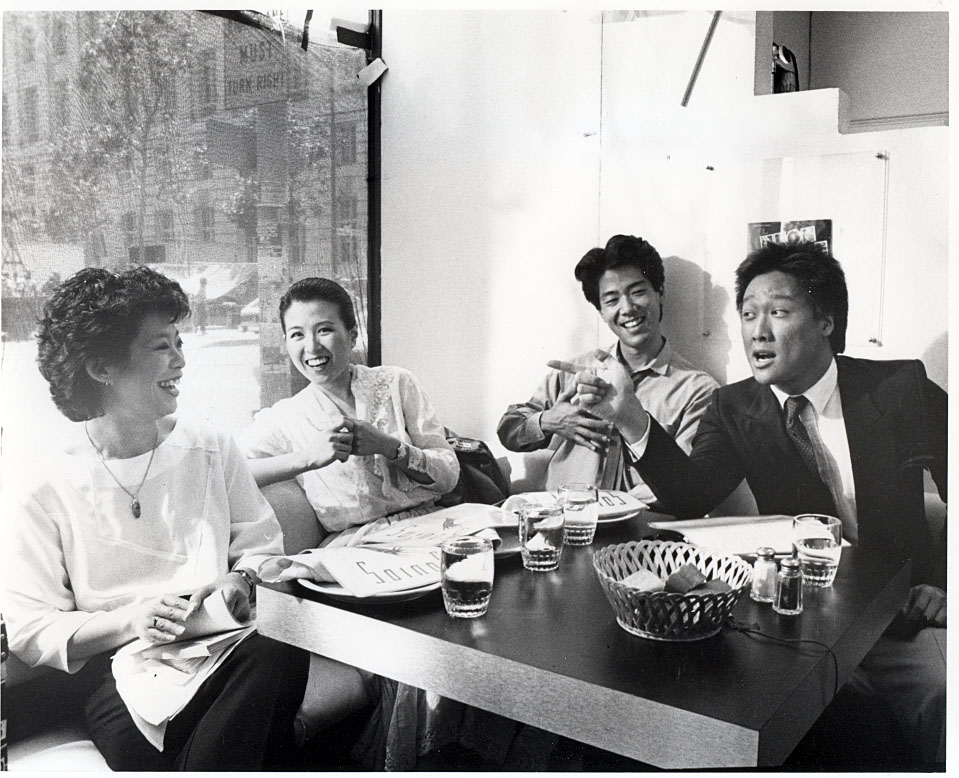
From left to right: Laureen Chew, Cora Miao, Marc Hayashi, Kelvin Han Yee.

== Filmography ==
=== Film ===
Year	Title	Role	Notes	Ref.
1986	A Great Wall	Paul Fang		
1993	So I Married an Axe Murderer	Master Cho		
1995	Copycat	Chinese inspector		
1996	Chalk	TC		
1998	Patch Adams	Orderly		
1999	Dumbarton Bridge	Tron	Indie film	
1999	Life Tastes Good	Max		
1999	True Crime	Zachary Platt		
2001	Sweet November	Burly man		
2002	Cherish	Officer Yee		
2005	The Island	Censor		
2006	E-Ring	Admiral Chen		
2007	Lucky You	Chico Bahn		
2008	Milk	Gordon Lau		
2011	Bucky Larson: Born to Be a Star	Vietnamese mob boss		
2011	Silver Case	Business Man 1		
2011	Answers to Nothing	Medic		
2012	Keye Luke	Lee Luke		
2013	Wedding Palace	Wheeler Dealer Uncle		
2014	Fail/Safe	Kingpin	Short	
2014	The Jade Trader	Shin Shaw	Short	
2015	Silver Case: Director's Cut	Business Man 1	Originally released in 2011	
2015	Dead End	Mr. Lee	Short	
2015	I Won't Miss You	Tim's Dad	Short	
2016	Comfort	Martin		
2016	Singularity	Mr. Lee	Short	
2018	Destroyer	Lieutenant Oshima		
2018	Faith Under Fire	Harlon Moline		
2019	Samir	Frank		
2023	Godzilla Minus One	Tatsuo Hotta	English dub	
2023	May December	Joe Yoo Sr.		

=== Television ===
Year	Title	Role	Notes	Ref.
1996–1997, 2000–2001	Nash Bridges	Gene Kwon / Dr. Fong / Qwon Li / Gordon Chang	Episodes: "'Til Death Do Us Part" (as Gene Kwon; 1996), "Bombshell" (as Dr. Fong; 1997), "Heist" (as Qwon Li; 2000), "Bear Trap" (as Gordon Chang; 2001)	
2004	Hawaii	Detective Scott Chen	Episode: "Cops 'n' Robbers"	
2004	Sucker Free City	Henchman	Television film	
2004	The Bold and the Beautiful	Dr. Ying		
2005	24	Craig Erwich	Episode: "Day 4: 1:00p.m.-2:00p.m."	
2005	The Young and the Restless	Dr. Jun		
2005	Curb Your Enthusiasm	Newscaster	Episode: "Lewis Needs a Kidney"	
2007	Chuck	Rashan Chan	Episode: "Chuck Versus the Crown Vic"	
2008	Days of Our Lives	Doctor		
2008	The Mentalist	Davis	Pilot episode	
2008	Raising the Bar	Judge Anthony Hu	Episode: "Bagels and Locks"	
2008	Entourage	Taxi Driver	Episode: "First Class Jerk"	
2008	Prison Break	Company Surgeon / Doctor	2 episodes	
2008–2009	Crash	Chun Soo Park	5 episodes	
2009	Golden Boy	Mitch	Television film	
2009	Lie to Me	Ambassador Park Jung-Soo	Episode: "Love Always"	
2009	Eastwick	Doctor	Episode: "Reaping and Sewing"	
2009	Accidentally on Purpose	Dad	Episode: "Class"	
2010	Criminal Minds	Detective Ekler	Episode: "The Fight"	
2011	Hawaii Five-0	Chief of Police Mahaka	Episode: "Ua Hiki Mai Kapalena Pau (Until the End is Near)", "Oia'i'o (Truth)" (Season 1, episodes 23–24; uncredited)	
2011	Quantum Cops	The Chief	Web series	
2012	Chinatown Squad	Uncle Wong	Television movie	
2015	Chicago P.D.	Dennis Lee	Episode: "The Three Gs"	
2015	The Story of Billy the Kidd	Keegan Oryee	Television movie	
2018	S.W.A.T.	Jae Kim	Episode: "K-Town", "Vendetta" (Season 1, episodes 11 & 20)	
2018	GLOW	Henry Wu	Episode: "Mother of All Matches"	
2019–2024	9-1-1	John Lee	Episodes: "Chimney Begins" (2019), "Seize the Day" (2020), "There Goes The Groom" (2024)	
2019	Grey's Anatomy	Dr. James Lou	Episode: "Good Shepherd"	
2019	Blue Bloods	Mr. Chen	Episode: "Behind the Smile"	
2019	All Rise	Judge Randall Roberts	Episode: "Maricela in the Desert"	
2020	FBI: Most Wanted	Mr. Woo	Episode: "Silkworm"	
2021	The Unicorn	Dr. Wilson	Episode: "So Far Away"	
2021	Bosch	Assistant Chief of Police Lester Sales	Episode: "Brazen"	
2021	Magnum P.I.	Dan Liu	Episode: "Island Vibes"	
2022	Space Force	General Gao	Episode: "The Chinese Delegation"	
2022	Reacher	Marine (Butch)	Episode: "In a Tree"	
2022	Partner Track	Franklin "Papa" Min	3 episodes	
2023	Beef	Bruce Lau	Episode: "The Drama of Original Choice"	
2023	Law & Order: Organized Crime	Captain Lin	Episode: "Chinatown", "Blood Ties" (Season 3, episodes 16–17)	
2023	Quantum Leap	Liu Wei	Episode: "S.O.S."	
2023	Launchpad	Malcolm	Episode: "Maxine"	
2024	The Brothers Sun	Zhi Zhu	Episode: "Favor for a Favor"	
