= Quentin Lee =

Canadian screenwriter, director (born 1971)

- Born: 李孟熙; 1971 (age 54–55); Hong Kong
- Citizenship: Canada; United States
- Occupations: Director; writer
- Years active: 1992–present

Quentin Lee (Chinese: 李孟熙; pinyin: Lǐ Mèngxī; Cantonese Yale: Lei5 Maang6 Hei1; born 1971) is a Hong Kong-born Canadian-American film writer, director, and producer. He is most notable for the television series Comedy InvAsian and feature films The People I've Slept With (2009), Ethan Mao (2004), and Shopping for Fangs (1997), which he co-directed with Justin Lin.

Lee's films often feature male lead characters who are Asian American and gay, two minority groups generally not seen as lead characters in mainstream Hollywood films.

== Early life ==
Born in Hong Kong, Lee immigrated to Montreal, Canada when he was 15 due to the financial panic speculating the handover of Hong Kong in 1997.

Lee studied English at UC Berkeley and went on to receive an MA in English from Yale University in 1993. He went on to attend USC School of Cinematic Arts but transferred to UCLA after getting off its waitlist. Lee graduated with an MFA from the UCLA School of Theater, Film and Television in 1999.

== Feature films ==
=== 1993–1999: Projects at UCLA Film School ===
Lee founded the production company Margin Films in 1996. The company later moved into theatrical film distribution, starting with the film Bugis Street.

Flow (1996) was Lee's first feature film, which focused on a gay filmmaker talking about his work to an unseen friend behind a camera, and then became a series of films within a film, as the audience is then shown four of the filmmaker's short films. The film screened at the Vancouver International Film Festival, the Turin Gay & Lesbian Film Festival, the London Gay & Lesbian Film Festival, and Outfest and received positive reviews from L.A. Weekly as well as the Los Angeles Times.

Lee's second feature Shopping for Fangs, a "gay vampire drama", was co-directed with classmate Justin Lin and premiered at the 1997 Toronto International Film Festival. The film stars John Cho and is considered to be a cult classic in the Asian American independent film genre.

=== 2000–present: Post graduation and independent work ===
Drift (2000) was Lee's third feature film, which starred Reggie Lee, Greyson Dayne and Jonathon Roessler, and which got nominated for Best Feature film at the Torino International Gay & Lesbian Film Festival. Ethan Mao (2004) was Lee's fourth feature film, which won an Audience Award at the Torino International Gay & Lesbian Film Festival. Jun Hee Lee starred as the title character, Ethan Mao.

Lee's film The People I've Slept With—which was written and produced by Koji Steven Sakai—premiered at the 2009 Hawaii International Film Festival, internationally at the 2009 São Paulo International Film Festival, the 2010 Taipei Golden Horse Film Festival in Asia, and the 2010 Hamburg Lesbian and Gay Film Festival in Europe. The film stars Karin Anna Cheung as a pregnant woman who is looking for the true identity of her baby's father.

White Frog is a coming of age story about an autistic teenager who struggles through the loss of his older brother. It stars Booboo Stewart, Gregg Sulkin, and Harry Shum Jr. The film premiered at the CAAMFest in 2012. Fortissimo Films purchased the international distribution rights in 2011.

=== Short films and documentaries ===
Lee's first foray into documentary film, 0506HK (2007), premiered July 2007 at the Vancouver International Film Centre Hong Kong Stories film series, commemorating the 10-year anniversary of Hong Kong's handover to China. The film explored his personal and political perspectives on whether to return to Hong Kong, as well as the evolving cultural and social climate, through interviews with family members and friends living and working in both Hong Kong and Los Angeles.

His short film Gay Hollywood Dad (2018) is about the journey he underwent as a surrogate father.

=== Producing ===
As a producer, Lee joined the Producers Guild of America in 2016 and has founded the AAPI Working Group at the PGA with member co-leads Alan Chu, Sibyl Santiago and Jonathan Wang in 2020. Lee is also a member of Canadian Media Producers Association and a member of the Directors Peer Group of Academy of Television Arts & Sciences.

Films that Lee produced that he did not direct include the feature film Chink starring Jason Tobin, Eugenia Yuan and Tzi Ma, directed by Stanley Yung and written by Koji Steven Sakai, who wrote his previous film, The People I've Slept With. The film premiered at the 2013 Los Angeles Asian Pacific Film Festival. He was also a producer on Ringo Le's feature film, Big Gay Love (2013). He has also served as a producer on the short documentary, Taky Kimura: The Dragon's Legacy (2010), directed by Mellissa Tong. He has produced and photographed Searching for Anna May Wong (2020), co-directed by Z. Eric Yang and Denise Chan and the Wieden + Kennedy PSA The Myth (2022), directed by Jackie Bao.

In 2022, Lee created the stand-up comedy series Comedy Invasion, highlighting comedians from diverse backgrounds including people of colour, people with disabilities and LGBTQ comedians.

== Writing ==
Lee has also published a novel, entitled Dress Like a Boy in 2000. It has received positive reviews in publications such as AsianWeek and XY Magazine. Lee's novel, The Secret Diary of Edward Ng, is a gay coming of age story partly inspired by his time at Berkeley. It was released in August 2019.

In October 2009, Lee's graphic novel Campus Ghost Story, created in collaboration with artist John Hahn was published by Fresh Fear, an imprint of Margin Films.

== Personal life ==
Lee is openly gay. He has a younger sister. He has a son through surrogacy.

Lee, along with 48 other patients, have accused former USC and UCLA doctor Dennis Kelly of sexual abuse.

== Filmography ==
=== As director ===
- Anxiety of Inexpression and the Otherness Machine (1992)
- To Ride a Cow (1993)
- Flow (1996)
- Shopping for Fangs (1997)
- Fall 1990 (1999)
- Drift (2000)
- Ethan Mao (2004)
- 0506HK (2007)
- The People I've Slept With (2009)
- Little Love (2010)
- Today Has Been Weird (2011)
- White Frog (2012)
- The Unbidden (2016)
- Boy Luck Club (2020)
- Comisery (2020)
- Brash Boys Club (2020)
- Comedy Invasion (2022)
- Last Summer of Nathan Lee (2023)
- Laugh Proud (2024)
