= Ethan Mao =

- Film poster, also used as a DVD cover
- Directed by: Quentin Lee
- Written by: Quentin Lee
- Produced by: Quentin Lee; Stanley Yung
- Starring: Jun Hee Lee; Raymond Ma; Julia Nickson-Soul; Kevin Kleinberg
- Cinematography: James Yuan
- Edited by: Christine Kim
- Music by: Steven Pranoto
- Distributed by: TLA Releasing
- Release date: November 10, 2004
- Running time: 87 minutes
- Countries: Canada; United States
- Language: English

Ethan Mao is a 2004 drama film written and directed by Quentin Lee. It was shown at the AFI Film Festival on November 10, 2004, and the Hong Kong Lesbian and Gay Film Festival on December 10 of the same year. The DVD was released in North America on September 20, 2005.

== Plot ==
Ethan Mao (Jun Hee Lee) is a closeted gay teen who is kicked out of his house after his manipulative stepmother Sarah (Julia Nickson-Soul) finds a gay pornographic magazine in his room and shows it to his traditionalist father. On the street, Ethan is forced to become a hustler for money. Soon, he meets Remigio (Jerry Hernandez), a teen hustler and drug dealer, and the two become friends and live together.

Ethan and Remigio plan to go to Ethan's old home over the Thanksgiving holiday (when Ethan knows everyone will be away visiting other family) to get money, some old belongings, and Ethan's deceased mother's necklace—which he feels is the only thing he has to remember her by. But when the family returns to the house to pick up a forgotten gift—while Ethan and Remigio are inside—they feel forced to take everyone hostage.

The plan is to hold Ethan's father Abraham, Sarah, bullying stepbrother Josh (Kevin Kleinberg), and younger brother Noel in the home until the next day when the banks open and Sarah can go to the safety deposit box and retrieve Ethan's mother's necklace. Everything goes smoothly until Sarah leaves for the bank and decides to call the police.

As the police surround the house, Ethan and Remigio are forced to make a choice about how everything will come to an end. They decide to walk out together and give themselves up to the police. After they kiss, the film cuts to them on bed together without lights on. Remigio asks Ethan to "let [him] know" when Ethan falls in love with anyone "no matter where [Remigio is]". Ethan responds positively that, if he falls in love with anyone, he will make sure Remigio is the first person to know.

== Cast ==
- Jun Hee Lee as Ethan Mao
- Raymond Ma as Abraham Mao
- Julia Nickson-Soul as Sarah Mao
- Kevin Kleinberg as Josh
- Jerry Hernandez as Remigio
- David Tran as Noel Mao
