= Cyndee San Luis =

Filipino American actress

- Born: Cyndee San Luis
- Website: http://cyndeesanluis.com

Cyndee San Luis is a Filipino American actress. She plays Paulita Maya in the HBO series The Newsroom, who appears in the Fourth Episode of the First Season, "I'll Try to Fix You." She was also in BET's He's Mine Not Yours as Natalie Su. She has also appeared in Dave Coulier's Can't Get Arrested Web Series Episode 2: "Saved by the Bell - Ding!" with Dave Coulier, Dennis Haskins and Kato Kaelin. She has also played double roles as twin sisters (Faye S. and Twin Sister) in the short film, The Case (Directed by Timothy Tau). Additionally, she appears as Lenore "Casey" Case, the secretary to Britt Reid/The Green Hornet in the Green Hornet segment of Timothy Tau's bio-pic, Keye Luke.

She also serves as a producer on the entertainment news TV series E-Asylum which she serves as a host on, and has written a short film entitled The Cry. She has also covered events as a host such as The 2nd Annual Streamy Awards and Coin-Op TV as well as hosted "Sneak Peek of the Oscars" for Cosmo Celebrity TV. She has trained under Actress Gloria Gifford, and appeared in stage productions such as La Ronde and Annie Hall under Gifford's direction.

San Luis is a graduate of UCLA, with a B.A. in psychology, summa cum laude, went to high school at Cimarron-Memorial in Las Vegas, Nevada (graduating as valedictorian there) and was born and raised in Chicago.
