= Shopping for Fangs =

- DVD cover
- Directed by: Quentin Lee; Justin Lin
- Written by: Dan Alvarado; Justin Lin; Quentin Lee
- Produced by: Quentin Lee
- Starring: Radmar Agana Jao; Jeanne Chin; Clint Jung; Lela Lee; John Cho
- Cinematography: Lisa Wiegand
- Edited by: Justin Lin; Quentin Lee; Sean Yeo
- Music by: Steven Pranato
- Distributed by: Margin Films
- Release dates: March 7, 1997 (CAAMFest); April 18, 1998 (United States)
- Running time: 90 minutes
- Countries: United States; Canada
- Language: English

Shopping for Fangs is a 1997 black comedy film directed by Quentin Lee and Justin Lin, starring Radmar Agana Jao. The film marks the debut of actor John Cho.

== Plot ==
Housewife Katherine loses consciousness and loses her cell phone as a result. Lesbian waitress Trinh sends her sexually suggestive messages and pictures. Katherine's husband works with a man by the name of Phil.

Payroll clerk Phil, who is confused about his sexuality, thinks that he is transforming into a werewolf because his hair grows so quickly that he has to shave every hour, he gorges on raw meat, and he is uninjured after being struck by a car.

== Cast ==
- Radmar Jao as Phil
- Jeanne Chin as Katherine
- Clint Jung as Jim
- Lela Lee as Naomi
- John Cho as Clarance
- Peggy Ahn as Grace
- Scott Eberlein as Matt
- Daniel Twyman as Dr. Suleri
- Jennifer Hengstenberg as Sammi
- Dana Pan as May

== Production ==
The film's budget was less than $100,000 and had a filming schedule of 21 days in Los Angeles and the San Gabriel Valley. The film was partially funded with a Canada Council grant. Lee and Lin separated the filming between themselves, with Lee filming the part with Katherine and Lin filming the part with Phil. The term "GenerAsian X" may have been coined because of this film's release, with the X later being removed.

Lee said in a 2012 interview, "Shopping for Fangs is about finding connections, which is a theme that threads through all my movies." He also said, "It’s hard to quantify cultural impact, but certainly years after, scholars and critics are still talking about Shopping for Fangs." He added, "In our culture now we tend to think of people as having fixed identities. We tried to use the myths in the film to make these identities fluid again and make us question what we’re really about."

== Release ==
The film premiered at the 1997 San Francisco International Asian American Film Festival (CAAMFest) on March 7, 1997. It also screened at the 1997 Toronto International Film Festival. The film was distributed by Lin's company Margin Films.

== Reception ==
J.R. Jones of the Chicago Reader commented, "Like so many other indie releases of its time, this 1997 comedy is a knockoff of Pulp Fiction, with oddball characters, intersecting story lines, and plenty of B-movie flash. But it’s got real energy, and its solid grounding in LA’s Asian community gives the laughs a genuine cultural point of view."

David Noh, writing for Film Journal, said, "Under the circumstances, the actors manage to do rather nicely." Edward Guthmann, of San Francisco Chronicle, wrote, "Despite some fresh ideas, attractive actors and a sly, surprising performance by Chin as the disaffected Katherine, this is a rough first effort."

On the review aggregator website Rotten Tomatoes, 50% of 6 critics' reviews are positive.

== Home media ==
The film was released on DVD on October 6, 2009 by Pathfinder Home Entertainment.
