= Ina-Alice Kopp =

Austrian actress

- Born: Ina-Alice Kopp; 1981 (age 44–45)
- Years active: 2000 — present
- Website: http://www.inaalicekopp.com

Ina-Alice Kopp is an Austrian actress.

She starred as "Ge Li Er" in the 2010 Chinese TV War Drama Departed Heroes (Yuan Qu De Fei Ying), directed by Qing Hua. She also played the receptionist of Isabelle Wright (Sarah Jessica Parker) in episode 3 of season 4 in Fox's TV show, Glee, entitled "Makeover".

Kopp appeared in Klimt as the daughter of Gustav Klimt (played by John Malkovich). She has also starred in several Austrian TV series, including Ex - Eine romantische Komödie and Die Country Kids aus der Steiermark.

She also stars as an assassin in Timothy Tau's web series Quantum Cops, and played one of the judges in Megan Lee's music video for "Destiny", directed by Tau. She also played 1940s actress Jan Wiley in Tau's short film bio-pic Keye Luke.

She will be starring in the upcoming film Nephilim alongside John Savage. She also starred in the short film The Learning Curve directed by Scott Eriksson, which screened at film festivals including the HollyShorts Film Festival, received an Honorable Mention at the Los Angeles Movie Awards and was also an official selection of the New York City International Film Festival, among others.

Kopp received a B.A. in both Sinology and Economics and Business Administration from Vienna University, and also attended Fudan University in Shanghai/China. She completed a Masters of Science in International Management in China at the School of Oriental and African Studies at the University of London, in London, England.

== Filmography ==
- Flytrap (2015)
- Nephilim (2014)
- Big Gay Love (2013)
- Glee (2012) - Receptionist
- The Learning Curve (2012) - Grace Leonard
- Keye Luke (2012) - Jan Wiley
- Megan Lee's Destiny (2011) - Judge Paula Kopf
- Quantum Cops (2011) - Assassin Puma Dopfer
- Departed Heroes (2010) (Yuan Qu De Fei Ying) - Ge Li Er
- Oben Ohne (Austrian TV Series) (2008–2010) - Margarita
- Der Teufel mit den drei goldenen Haaren (2009) (TV Movie) - Prinzessin Isabella
- Schnell ermittelt (Austrian TV series)(2008–2009) - Beatrix Felder
- Ex - Eine romantische Komödie (Austrian TV Series) (2008) - Gwendolin
- Daniel Käfer - Die Schattenuhr (TV Movie) (2008) - Barbara
- Klimt (2008) - Klimt's Daughter in Bordello
- Die Country Kids aus der Steiermark (2005) - Suzanna
