= Seattle Asian American Film Festival =

Film festival in Seattle

- Founded: 2003

The Seattle Asian American Film Festival was founded in 1985 and has been revived over the years by different producers. The current iteration was founded in 2012 and made its debut in 2013 by co-founders Kevin Bang and Vanessa Au. It is a revival of (and a return to the events original name) of the previously running Northwest Asian American Film Festival, which was directed by Wes Kim from 2003 to 2007 and which had experienced a five-year hiatus. The inaugural film festival was also held at the Wing Luke Asian Museum from January 25 to 27, 2013. The festival is currently run and directed by executive director, Vanessa Au, and Festival Director, Victoria Ju.

== History ==
=== Origins ===
The Seattle Asian American Film Festival was founded in 1985 by KingStreet Media, a community-based Asian American media production and advocacy group based in Seattle's International District. Kingstreet Media was an offshoot of the International Examiner newspaper as almost all its members were either photographers, writers or graphic artists for the paper. The festival came about after the group helped complete "Beacon Hill Boys" - the first ever dramatic film about Asian American youth. The film had caused a sensation locally when it premiered a few months earlier, had been nominated for a student Academy Award, and was beginning to make the festival rounds nationally and internationally. Capitalizing on the film's success and looking to expand their commitment to raising the profile of Asian American cinema the group put together the city's first all Asian American film festival. To emphasize recent breakthroughs in Asian American filmmaking, which up until that time had been almost completely dominated by documentary work, the festival featured programs made up entirely of narrative films (dramas, comedies, etc.). In addition to "Beacon Hill Boys," the line-up included Wayne Wang's acclaimed sleeper hit "Chan Is Missing," Visual Communications' historical epic "Hito Hata: Raise The Banner," Stephen Ning's coming-of-age tale "Freckled Rice," Robert Nakamura's multi-ethnic comedy "Fool's Dance," and Steven Okazaki's mother/daughter profile "The Only Language She Knows" among others. The festival was held at Seattle's historic Nippon Kan Theater with the International Examiner acting as media sponsor. The festival's founders and staff included Dean Wong, William Satake Blauvelt, Sumi Hayashi, Dean Hayasaka, Ken Mochizuki, Jeff Hanada, Greg Tuai, and Jesse Reyes.

The second edition of the festival was held in 1987 with the International Examiner taking over as producer. The paper hired Nellie Fujii-Anderson as festival director and William Satake Blauvelt returned as Programming Director. Also, several other KingStreet Media members who also worked for the paper helped again. This time the festival was held at the University of Washington's Kane Hall and featured an expanded line-up of narrative, documentary, experimental and animation films, as well as independent films from around Asia. The Examiner had taken on the festival, in part, as a way to raise funds for the newspaper. Although the festival was successful on different levels, they soon found out that film festivals in general were not money-making propositions and so declined to act as producer for any further editions. The International Examiner did continue its role as a media sponsor of the festival to the present day.

The festival then went on hiatus for several years until it was revived in 1994 by Emily Wong, then Assistant Editor of the International Examiner, and William Satake Blauvelt who had been working as a filmmaker/curator/critic. This time the Seattle Asian American Film Festival was set up as an independent organization that put together a large coalition of volunteers, as well as community and media sponsors from within and outside of the Asian American community. Screenings were held at the Seattle Art Museum with side-bar events happening around the city. From 1994 through 1998 SAAFF, as the festival was affectionately dubbed, became nationally known as one of the premiere Asian American film festivals in the country which supported many filmmakers who went on to greater fame including Ang Lee ("Broke Back Mountain"), Kayo Hata ("Picture Bride"), Frieda Lee Mock ("Maya Lin: A Strong Clear Vision"), Kip Fulbeck ("The Hapa Project"), and Justin Lin ("Better Luck Tomorrow"). Aside from the festival itself the SAAFF organization co-sponsored year-round premiere screenings of Asian American films that found mainstream distribution like "The Joy Luck Club." The festival also published quarterly newsletters and a comprehensive annual booklet. Prizes - the Gold, Silver and Bronze Carp Awards for the best films as voted on by the audience were introduced. Programming was further expanded by doing retrospective tributes to selected directors and actors; archival screenings; commissioned live scores for silent films; as well as panels and Q&A's with visiting filmmakers. SAAFF also expanded their efforts to be more international in scope and featured work from around the Pacific Rim that featured under represented groups like Australian aboriginal and Pacific Islander filmmakers. SAAFF also made a commitment to showing work that up to that time had been ignored by the Asian American community including transgressive, experimental work on taboo subjects and films dealing with the Gay and Lesbian experience. Work was screened in all formats including 35mm, 16mm, 8mm, and video. In addition to Emily Wong (Director) and William Satake Blauvelt (Programing Director) the festival staff included John Pai, Albert Shen, Mari Murao, Shannon Gee, Soyon Im, and Vuong Vu among many others.

=== 2003 Revival ===
The festival was revived once again in 2003 and re-branded as the Northwest Asian American Film Festival and was led by Director Wes Kim for four years, until 2007. Kim is also a filmmaker, writer, director, and producer of the award-winning short films Profiles in Science, Vision Test, and Cookies for Sale, and Kim's films have appeared in over 40 U.S. and international film festivals and have screened in 17 countries, as well as being broadcast nationally on public and cable television and featured in programs at the Museum of Modern Art in New York and the Wing Luke Asian Museum in Seattle.

=== 2012–2013 revival ===
After the festival concluded in 2007 and took a five-year hiatus, the festival was revived under its original name of the "Seattle Asian American Film Festival" in 2012–2013. Former director Wes Kim still serves as an Advisor on the Festival.

== 2013 inaugural festival ==
The inaugural 2013 film festival featured Eliachi Kimaro's documentary A Lot Like You as Opening Night film (the film also won Best Documentary at the San Francisco International Asian American Film Festival, and was a Top 10 Audience Choice Award at the Seattle International Film Festival (SIFF)). The festival also featured a short film program entitled Cinematropolis curated by Seattle-based hip hop group Blue Scholars, and named after their album of the same name. Other films included a film written and produced by Yuji Okumoto and directed by Blaine Ludy entitled Out, and Andrew Ahn's Dol (First Birthday) (Official Selection of the 2012 Sundance Film Festival).

Other films include the documentary Manilatown Is In the Heart, short films such as Scott Eriksson's How War Ends, Jocelyn Saddi-Lenhardt's Mother and Child (a Visual Communications "Armed With a Camera" fellowship film), Steve Nguyen and Choz Belen's Hibakusha, Valerie Soe's short film The Chinese Gardens, Akira Boch's The Crumbles (winner of an Audience Award at the San Francisco International Asian American Film Festival), Iris Shim's multiple-award-winning documentary, The House of Suh, Yumiko Gamo Romer's Mrs. Judo: Be Strong, Be Gentle, Be Beautiful, several short documentaries that were also Visual Communications "Armed With A Camera" fellowship films such as Basketball, Meri Jaan by Veena Hampapur, That Particular Time by Jeff Man, and Magellan Doesn't Live Here by Micki Davis.

The final day of the festival screened Tadashi Nakamura's documentary, Jake Shimabukuro: A Life on Four Strings, S. Leo Chiang's Mr. Cao Goes to Washington, (Best Documentary at the DC Asian Pacific American Film Festival and the Audience Award for Documentary Feature at the New Orleans Film Festival), Porter Erisman's Crocodile in the Yangtze, and Closing Night film was Timothy Tau's Keye Luke, a short film bio-pic on the actor and the artist who grew up in Seattle that was most known for being the first on-screen Kato in the 1940s Green Hornet film serials before Bruce Lee and the All-American "Number One Son," Lee Chan, in the popular Charlie Chan films of the 1930s. Keye Luke is also related to Wing Luke, former Assistant Attorney General of Washington, member of the Seattle City Council and the first Asian American to hold elected office in the state, who also is the namesake of Seattle's Wing Luke Asian Museum. The Luke family and the Luke Family Association are also still based in Seattle currently.
