= Comedy Invasion =

Canadian stand-up comedy TV series

Comedy Invasion is a Canadian stand-up comedy television series, which premiered in 2022 on the Asian American Movies (AAM.tv) streaming platform, and was later distributed to other television services via syndication. Created by Quentin Lee, the series features stand-up comedy performances by diverse comedians, including people of colour, LGBTQ comedians and people with disabilities.

Comedians featured in the series include Peter Chao, Desirée Walsh, Karla Marx, Alisha Dhillon, Victoria Banner, Yumi Nagashima, DJ On and Keith Nahanee.

The series is a spinoff of Comedy InvAsian, Lee's earlier American Hulu series which focused exclusively on Asian American comedians. Lee created the series, and released it through AAM after unsuccessfully pitching it to Canadian broadcasters.

Nahanee's episode, "Rez Style", received a Canadian Screen Award nomination for Best Comedy Special at the 12th Canadian Screen Awards in 2024.
