= Jun Hee Lee =

American actor

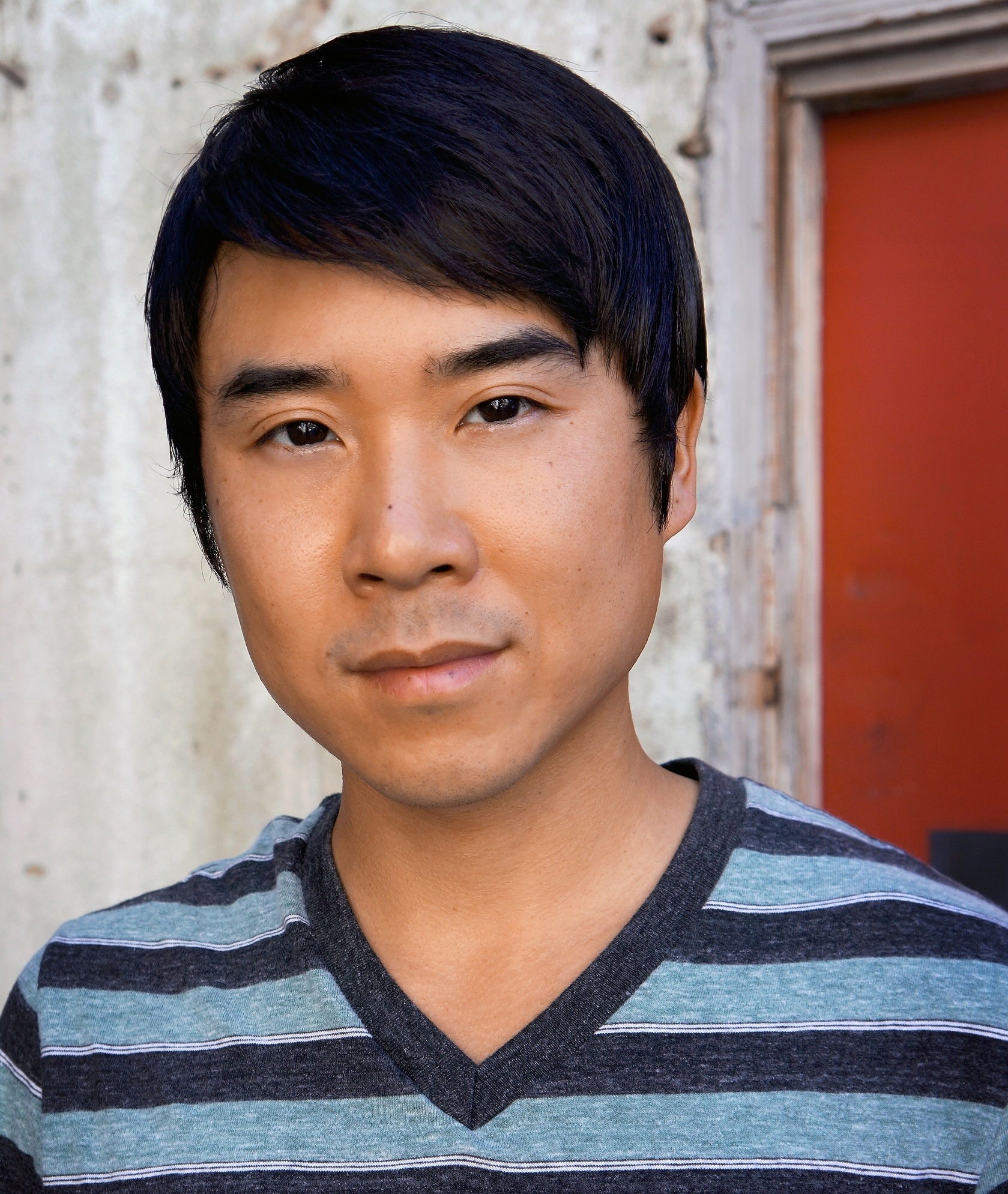
- Born: St. Louis, Missouri, U.S.
- Occupation: Actor
- Height: 5 ft 9 in (175 cm)

Jun Hee Lee is an American actor. He was born in St. Louis, Missouri and attended Boston University.

== Acting career ==
Jun Hee Lee's film roles include: "Derrick" in Vampires Suck, "Jimmy" in American Pie: Band Camp, the titular character in the 2004 film Ethan Mao, and as "Kevin" in the gory independent horror film KatieBird *Certifiable Crazy Person.

His other TV credits include: "Quan" on The Mindy Project, "Simon" on House, and he also made guest starring roles in the popular Nickelodeon TV series Drake & Josh.

Lee also voiced the blind, teenage assassin "Con Smith" in the video game Killer7 for GameCube and PlayStation 2, and he was the host of AZN's prime TV show Asia Street as well as the host for AZN's most watched music video show Revolution.

== Credits ==
Year	Title	Role	Notes
2004	Drake & Josh		Episode: "Smart Girl"
2004	Ethan Mao	Ethan Mao	
2005	KatieBird *Certifiable Crazy Person	Kevin Cool	
2005	Killer7	Con Smith (voice)	Video game
2005	American Pie Presents: Band Camp	Jimmy	Direct-to-video
2007	Deface	Beggar Boy #1	Short film
2007	Damn the Past!	Mario	Short film
2007	Eli's Liquor Store	Korean Patron #2	
2010	Vampires Suck	Derric	
2011	House	Simon	Episode: "Risky Business"
2013	G.I. Joe: Retaliation	North Korean Captain	
2013	The Mindy Project	Quan	Episode: "Santa Fe"
2014	Bollywood Stripper	Jason	Short film
2016	American Crime Story	Dennis Fung	3 episodes
2016	Officer Downe	Fortune 500 Aide	
2017	Girlboss	Edwin	Episode: "Ladyshopper99"
2018	Once Upon a Date	Sales Guy	Television film
2018	NCIS: Los Angeles	Eric Park	Episode: "Liabilities"
2018	Cagney & Lacey	David Chen	Unaired pilot
2019	Unbelievable	Officer Geoffrey Morris	4 episodes
