= Peter Chao =

Canadian comedian (born 1987)

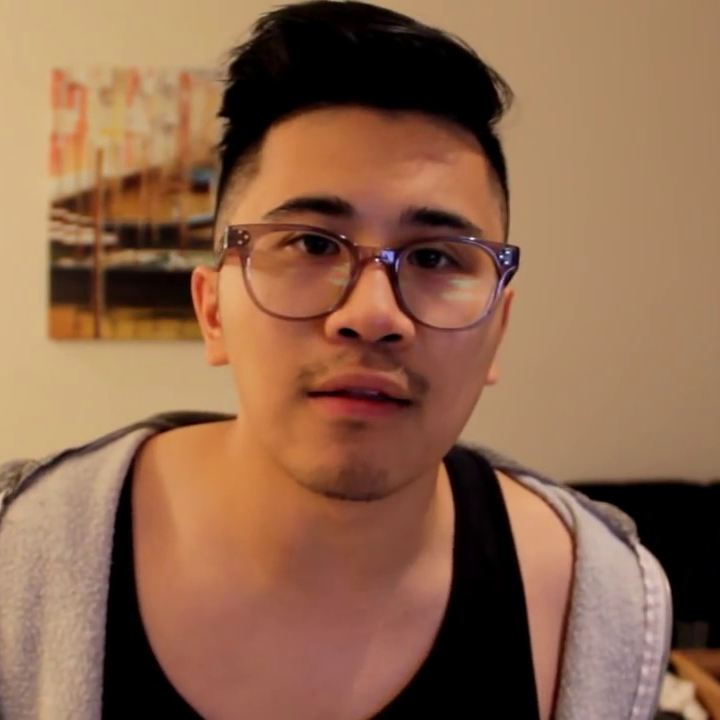
- Tong in 2015
- Born: Davin Tong; May 8, 1987 (age 39); Fredericton, New Brunswick, Canada
- Education: Vancouver Film School
- Occupation: YouTube personality
- Years active: 2009-present
- Spouse: Chelsea McGeachy (2013-present)
- Website: www.youtube.com/user/pyrobooby

Davin Tong, better known by his alias Peter Chao (born 1987), is a Canadian actor, comedic vlogger, and YouTube personality. He is known for his unconventional portrayals of Asian stereotypes, which alongside other comedic videos have amassed a following of over 1.2 million followers on TikTok and almost 800,000 subscribers on YouTube. Born and raised in New Brunswick, Canada, Tong is the second son of "Chinese immigrants", while his character Chao was born and raised in Hong Kong. Tong is bilingual, speaking both fluent English and Cantonese.

== Early life and education ==
Davin Tong was born and raised in New Brunswick, Canada, the second son of Chinese immigrants. He produced an early version of Paper Trail, a minute-long short film pertaining to a neighbor caught stealing newspapers, with director Travis Grant. The film caught the Vancouver Film School's attention and it subsequently issued scholarships to them. Tong graduated in 2008.

== Background ==
=== Personal life ===
Tong realised his flair for vlogging when one of his first YouTube uploads, about a Chinese restaurant run by Southeast Asians, garnered around 15,000 views. Under the username pyrobooby, Tong adopted the guise of "Chinese Guy", and later Peter Chao. Tong described the character as born and raised in Hong Kong, and "a zany Chinese immigrant forced into Canada by his street hustling mother. Instead of listening to his mother to go to school, he decided to pursue comedy on YouTube."

Tong's character Chao has drawn mixed reception, often being mistaken as a real person. After a misunderstanding with YouTube and Google officials, the account had been previously suspended for a period of fourteen days but reinstated and has remained free of controversy for over 10 years. Gabriella Nomura of The Vancouver Sun has branded Chao as "a breath of politically incorrect fresh air", while Kevin Tang of Amped Asia has called him "one of the most funny YouTube celebrities". However, viewership has been positive. The "Canton Style" music video – a parody of Korean singer-rapper Psy's "Gangnam Style" – amassed 1.1 million views within three days of its uploading. His videos are, as of 2011, the number one and two most watched in Canada. Tong has said, in response to audience comments that his performances are "controversial", that everything is "done for comedy. I don't discriminate when it comes to comedy". I take stereotypes and I make them outlandish so everybody can laugh."

=== Creative Content ===
Chao is seen in almost every video as sporting a pair of sunglasses a habit which kindled viewer interest. Tong attributes the sunglasses as contributing to Chao's "cool factor". In the videos, Chao puts on a "thick, over-the-top Cantonese" and "fresh-off-the-boat" accent. Chao also parodies popular songs, such as the Justin Bieber hits "As Long as You Love Me" and "Boyfriend", as well as criticizing and poking fun at other people, usually with profane language. Fans of Chao are referred to as "Chao Nation". Beth Hong of The Vancouver Observer writes that Chao is an example of a "FOB" or a "Honger". Tong – speaking in character – refutes this, stating, in a tongue and cheek manner, that "a FOB is a fresh-off-the-boat immigrant that come [sic] all the way from China to study in North America. Don't look at me, I'm not a FOB. I'm Peter Chao. FOBs can't speak a lick of English."

He performed a stand-up comedy set in the 2022 Canadian series Comedy Invasion.

=== Acting ===
After leaving a successful run as one of the top 50 YouTubers in the world as ‘Peter Chao’ (2009-2012 / 800K subscriptions / 200M global views), Tong, in 2016, began playing make-believe. He starring alongside film actors like Peter Dinklage (“American Dreamer”) and Danny Trejo (in Season 4 of 'The Flash').

His career continued to evolve in 2018, recurring in 3 episodes as a troubled young man who would soon develop a drug addiction in Netflix’s “Wu Assassins” as “Young Tommy” and followed that with back-to-back appearances in ABC’s “A Million Little Things”, Disney’s “Gabby Duran”, CBC Gem’s “Wild Cards”, and most recently in a Hallmark feature, “The Wedding Season”.

As Davin continues to chase the acting itch, he also made the most of his time during the pandemic, starting a TikTok page that grew his following to 1.2M followers and 30M video likes; an endeavour that helped ink him a sponsorship endorsement deal with Prime Video to promote their new catalog of films and original programming.

=== Professional Wrestling ===
Chao has appeared frequently in Elite Canadian Championship Wrestling beginning July 6, 2013 in Port Coquitlam, B.C. where Colt Cabana taught him a few things about wrestling. He was a part of ECCW Ballroom Brawl at the Commodore Ballroom in January 2014, the largest attendance for independent wrestling in Vancouver in the last 25 years.

== Discography ==
=== Music videos ===
Year	Title	Record label	Notes
2010	"Harry"	Pyrobooby Records	Lyrics by Peter Chao, parody of Justin Bieber's "Baby".
2011	"Asian and I Know It"	Peter Chao	Directed by IFHT and produced by JGrammBeats, parody of LMFAO's "Sexy and I Know It".
2011	"Mudabitch"	Peter Chao	Directed by IFHT & Van Dinh, produced by Gentleman Vibe, parody of Justin Bieber's "Boyfriend".
2011	"Mudafucka"	Pyrobooby Records	Written and produced by Peter Chao.
2011	"Fuck Christmas"	Gentleman's Vibe	Directed by IFHT, vocals by Gentlemen's Vibe.
2012	"As Rong As You Ruv Me"	Peter Chao	Directed by Van Dinh and produced by Gentleman's Vibe, parody of Justin Bieber's "As Long as You Love Me".
2012	"Canton Style"	Peter Chao	Directed by Matt Dennison and produced by Justin Villarosa, parody of Psy's "Gangnam Style".
2013	"Poop and Fart"	Peter Chao	Written and produced by Peter Chao, parody of will.i.am's "Scream & Shout".
2013	"Canton Style"	Peter Chao	Directed by Matt Dennison and produced by Justin Villarosa, parody of Psy's "Gangnam Style".
2013	"Douche"	Peter Chao	Written and produced by Peter Chao, parody of Taylor Swift's "22 (Taylor Swift song)".
2013	"White Man Food"	Peter Chao	Written and produced by Peter Chao.

== Filmography ==
=== Commercials ===
Year	Title	Role	Notes
2012	Campbell's Soup	SOC	North America, 2012
2013	Pizza Hut	Principal	North America, 2013
2013	Vote 2013 PSA	Principal	BC Regional, 2013

=== Film ===
Year	Title	Role	Notes
2010	The Plastic Protocol (short film)	Yu Wong	Directed by Peter Brown.
2010	Paper Trail	Hitman	Directed by Travis Grant and Tong.
2010	Therapy (short film)	Man	Directed by Lisa Newell.
2012	Grave Encounters 2	Himself	Directed by John Poliquin.
2013	The Hangover Part III	Himself - Chao's son (uncredited)	Directed by Todd Phillips.
2013	Jackhammer	Hammer's dream nemesis	Directed by Michael Hanus.
2014	A Fairly Odd Summer	Researcher	Directed by Savage Steve Holland.

=== Theatre and Stage ===
Year	Title	Role	Theatre/Stage
2011	Parlor Live! Club	Headliner	Parlor Live! Club, Bellevue, Washington
2011	Peter Chao and Friends	Headliner	Punch Line Comedy Club, Bellingham, Washington
2011	Peter Chao and Friends	Headliner	Punch Line Comedy Club, San Francisco
2013	I'm Not Racist	Headliner	Revue Stage, Vancouver
2014	Peter Chao's Asian Domination Tour	Headliner	National University of Singapore, Singapore
