= Daniel DPD Park =

Korean-American director and filmmaker

Daniel "DPD" Park (aka "DPD") is a Korean-American director and filmmaker, who directed a web-series entitled Ktown Cowboys, which won Best First Feature at the Los Angeles Asian Pacific Film Festival in 2010. He has also directed a number of music videos for Far East Movement, including "Rocketeer (LA Dreamer)" and "Dirty Bass featuring Tyga." He has also directed the music video for IAMMEDIC's "Schizophrenia".

He is currently working as executive producer on the show Alpha Girls with Mnet America.

Park was also featured in Grace Su's documentary Future Rockstars of America.

His production company is known as "Transparent Agency."

He has recently directed the feature version of Ktown Cowboys, which premiered at the 2015 SXSW (South by Southwest Film Festival). The film was executive produced by Ken Jeong, was written by Danny Cho and Brian Chung, and also stars Danny Cho, Bobby Choy, Peter Jae, Sunn Wee, Shane Yoon, Eric Roberts, Steve Byrne, Kim Young Chul, Simon Rhee and Daniel Dae Kim. In March 2016 the film received a four-city theatrical release prior to its video-on-demand release. Reviewing the film, The New York Times called it a "mess" and commented that the webseries was superior; The Washington Post said it was "haphazard"; and the Los Angeles Times also felt the film "misses the mark".
