= Hibakusha (film) =

- Directed by: Choz Belen; Steve Nguyen
- Written by: Steve Nguyen; Ivan Tsang
- Produced by: Steve Nguyen; Dean Matsuda; Brian L. Tan
- Starring: Karin Anna Cheung; Connie Lim; Daisuke Suzuki; William Frederick Knight; Jane Lui
- Production company: Studio APA
- Release date: September 28, 2012
- Running time: 45 minutes
- Country: United States
- Language: English

Hibakusha is a 2012 American animated short film directed by Steve Nguyen and Choz Belen, and produced by Iconic Films, the Documentary Channel (USA), and Studio APA in Los Angeles, California, and New York City, New York.

The film centers around Kaz Suyeishi, a woman in her late fifties who begins to reminisce about her earlier years living in Hiroshima, Japan during the aftermath of the atomic bombing. Inspired by her story, the filmmakers reached out to Mrs. Suyeishi in order to produce her biopic using computer animation and hand-drawn techniques.

The official trailer was released on July 30, 2012.

Since October 2012, the film has been screened at the Japanese American National Museum, Vietnamese International Film Festival, Wing Luke Museum in Seattle, Dragon Con in Atlanta, University of Michigan, UCLA, UC Irvine, UC San Diego, San Diego State University, UC Davis, UC Riverside, DisOrient Film Festival, University of Wisconsin–La Crosse, and California State University, Fullerton. Hibakusha received the Special Achievement Award and Best Animated Short in 2013 at the International Uranium Film Festival held in Rio de Janeiro.

== Plot ==
Kaz Suyeishi (Anna Cheung), a Japanese woman in her late fifties, finds herself reminiscing and reliving every minute of the events leading up to the bombing and decimation of her beloved hometown Hiroshima. Set in early August ‘85, exactly 40 years since the destruction, a local television station reaches out to Kaz while on a peace promotion tour in New York City to tell her inspirational childhood story. Once she accepts the invitation to speak on television, Kaz goes to the station the next evening and engages in a very tense conversation with the news anchor (played by Kato Cooks, who along with Timothy Tau also executive produced) and stern pilot, Paul Tibbets (played by William Frederick Knight) of the infamous Enola Gay. As Kaz begins to relive and play out the tragic events involving her family and friends, played by Daisuke Suzuki, Jane Lui, and Paul Dateh, her flashbacks guide us through an intense roller coaster of vivid imagery and uncanny reality.

== Inspiration ==
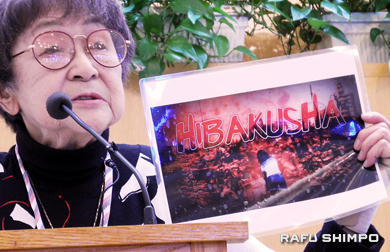
Kaz Suyeishi speaks about Hiroshima.

The film was inspired by the true story of Hiroshima atomic bomb survivor and Nguyen's close friend, Kaz Suyeishi. Through various tours and visits that Kaz made in the Southern California area, Nguyen took extensive notes during her lectures and wrote a screenplay loosely based on four different incidents that took place from 1945 to 1985 during Suyeishi's early life in Hiroshima and present day status. Suyeishi died on June 12, 2017, at the age of 90.

The characters were visually modeled after Nguyen's closest friends and family members. Through computer animation, Belen utilized specialized graphic design techniques and 3-D implementation to orchestrate the illustrations. Each drawing was replicated as a graphic cut out which was then edited to simulate dynamic movements. The film drew particular inspiration from the war reenactment scene in Richard E. Robbin's award winning documentary Operation Homecoming: Writing the Wartime Experience as well as the Ari Folman Golden Globe Award winning animated documentary, Waltz with Bashir.
