= Asia Street =

Programming block on the International Channel

Asia Street was the umbrella title for the International Channel's nightly three-hour prime-time block of shows geared towards Asian-Americans in the United States. The lineup continued in a different and modified approach on its successor, AZN Television.

Asia Street offered a mix of English-language original programming ranging from sitcoms to sketch comedy programs, as well as anime, dramas, movies and variety shows. One of the better-known shows that came out of that lineup was the in-house sketch variety series Asia Street Comedy, which debuted in 2004.

The block also sponsored the 23rd Annual San Francisco Asian American Film Festival.

From March 28, 2005, Asia Street became the basis for a shift towards the International Channel's rebrand and reprogramming as AZN Television.
