= Justin Lin =

Taiwanese-American filmmaker (born 1971)

- 林詣彬
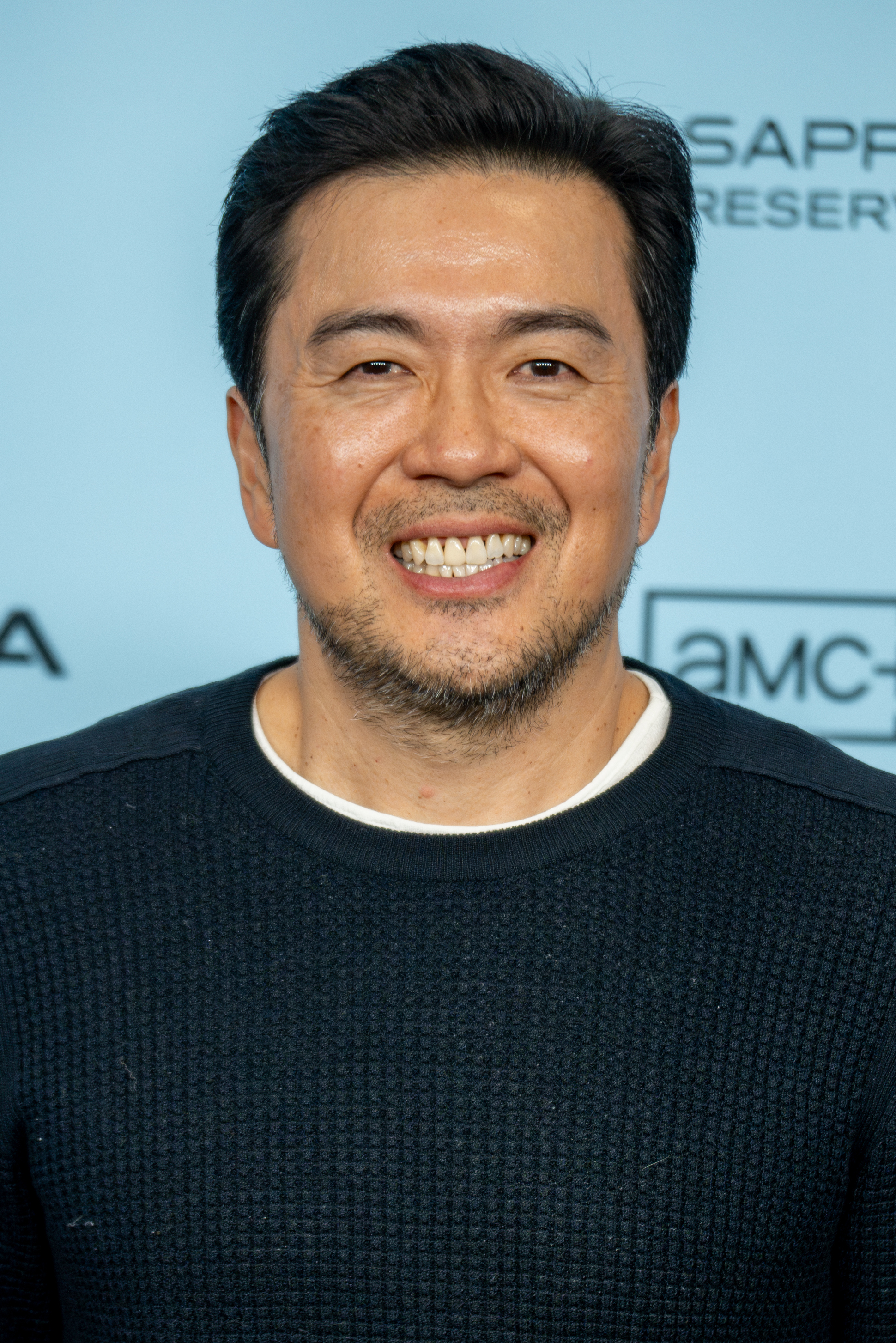
- Lin at the 2025 Sundance Film Festival
- Born: October 11, 1971 (age 54); Taipei, Taiwan
- Education: University of California, Los Angeles (BA, MFA)
- Occupations: Film and television director; producer; screenwriter
- Years active: 1994–present
- Children: 1

Chinese name
- Traditional Chinese: 林詣彬
- Simplified Chinese: 林诣彬
Transcriptions
Standard Mandarin
- Hanyu Pinyin: Lín Yìbīn
Southern Min
- Hokkien POJ: Lîm Gē-pin

Justin Lin (Chinese: 林詣彬; pinyin: Lín Yìbīn; Pe̍h-ōe-jī: Lîm Gē-pin, born October 11, 1971) is a Taiwanese-American filmmaker. His films have grossed over US$3 billion worldwide as of March 2017. He is best known for his directorial work on Better Luck Tomorrow (2002), the Fast & Furious franchise from The Fast and the Furious: Tokyo Drift (2006) to Fast & Furious 6 (2013) and F9 (2021), and Star Trek Beyond (2016). He is also known for his work on television programs like Community, Warrior, and True Detective.

== Early life and education ==
Lin was born on October 11, 1971, in Taipei, Taiwan. He immigrated with his family to the United States at the age of eight and grew up in Buena Park, California. He graduated from nearby Cypress High School. Lin earned the rank of Eagle Scout in March 1989 while a member of Boy Scout Troop 670.

Lin attended the University of California, San Diego, for two years before transferring to the University of California, Los Angeles (UCLA). He received a Bachelor of Arts with a major in film and television and a Master of Fine Arts in film directing and production from the UCLA School of Theater, Film and Television. He was given a Distinguished Alumni Award in 2017.

== Career ==
=== Film work ===
==== 1997–2005: Better Luck Tomorrow, Annapolis ====
Lin's first feature film was Shopping for Fangs (1997), which he co-directed with fellow UCLA Film School alumnus Quentin Lee when they were still at UCLA. The film stars John Cho and is considered to be a "cult classic" among independent Asian American films.

Lin wrote and directed a documentary, Crossover (2000), which focused on the 70-year-old phenomenon of the Japanese American Basketball Leagues, which were established in the 1930s.

Lin's solo directorial debut was Better Luck Tomorrow (2002), a film focusing on a circle of high-school-age Asian-Americans who become caught up in a cascading series of petty and then serious crimes. The film premiered at the Sundance Film Festival of that year, and in a question and answer session following a festival screening, Roger Ebert stood up and angrily responded to an audience member asking Lin if he thought it irresponsible to portray Asian-Americans in a negative light, saying, "[N]obody would say to a bunch of white filmmakers, 'How could you do this to your people?' ... Asian-American characters have the right to be whoever the hell they want to be. They do not have to 'represent' their people." Ebert's approval of the film drew the attention of major studios, eventually leading to MTV Films buying the film for distribution, MTV Films' first such acquisition. Better Luck Tomorrow was also an official selection of the 2002 Toronto International Film Festival, was nominated for a Grand Jury Prize at 2002 Sundance, and was a nominee for the John Cassavetes Award at the 2004 Independent Spirit Awards. Variety magazine named him one of the "Top 10 Directors to Watch" in 2002, citing the film.

Lin's second feature film—and first film to be produced and distributed by a large studio, Touchstone Pictures—was Annapolis (2006), which starred James Franco, Tyrese Gibson, Donnie Wahlberg and Jordana Brewster. The film cost US$26 million to make, but grossed only $17 million worldwide.

==== 2006–2015: Fast & Furious franchise, minor projects ====
His third feature film, The Fast and the Furious: Tokyo Drift, was released in North American cinemas on June 16, 2006. Despite mixed reviews, Tokyo Drift brought in over US$24 million on its opening weekend; the domestic box office would eventually total $62 million with a further $95 million accruing from the foreign box office, making total gross receipts $158 million. With Tokyo Drift, Lin would begin his run as director of the next three Fast & Furious films, leading the franchise until Furious 7. Lin was initially approached to direct the film after the success of Better Luck Tomorrow at Sundance, and after wrapping his first studio film Annapolis, but wanted some "conditions" met, as the script presented him was about "cars drifting around Buddhist statues and geisha girls." Instead, Lin wanted to make a film about Japan, which was "much more postmodern," as he mentioned, and intended to have a film on a more global scale that went against preconceived stereotypes.

After Tokyo Drift, Lin directed a short film that also premiered at the Sundance Global Short Film Project, La Revolución de Iguodala! (2007), about one individual's message as that individual travels through time and becomes embodied in different races. He also went on to do an independent film, Finishing the Game (2007), a mockumentary on the events surrounding the production of Bruce Lee's final film, Game of Death. It premiered at the 2007 Sundance Film Festival, and was also selected as the opening night film at a variety of North American film festivals, for instance at the 25th San Francisco International Asian American Film Festival.

Lin returned to direct Fast & Furious, the fourth in the film series, which opened on April 3, 2009. On its first day of release the movie grossed US$30.6 million, and peaked at the top spot of the weekend box office with $71.0 million. The film ultimately grossed $359 million worldwide.

Lin directed the follow-up 2011 film Fast Five, which holds the title for the highest-grossing opening weekend ever in April (US$84 million).

Following the success of Fast Five, Lin and his production company Barnstorm Pictures signed a two-year first-look deal with Universal Pictures, the company that owns the Fast and Furious franchise.

Lin continued with its sixth installment, Fast & Furious 6. It became the largest Memorial Day Weekend gross for a Universal Pictures film, setting a record of US$120 million and a worldwide total of $317 million. It also became the highest-grossing Universal Pictures film in the UK, with an opening weekend UK gross larger than any other movie in the series. Specifically, the film took more than US$4.4 million on its opening day, the biggest opening day for both the franchise and the studio in that market, the second-highest opening of 2013 (behind Iron Man 3 at $4.7 million), and the highest-grossing film of the day with 54% of the market. In the UK, the film also finished as the number one film of the weekend, taking around $14 million, making it the biggest opening for the franchise and Universal, and for a Vin Diesel film, and the second-biggest opening weekend of 2013 (again behind Iron Man 3, at around $18 million). The film performed relatively well critically. Metacritic describes it as having "generally favorable reviews", and Rotten Tomatoes reports 75% approval from top critics, and 83% approval from viewers, as of March 2017.

==== 2015–present: Star Trek Beyond ====
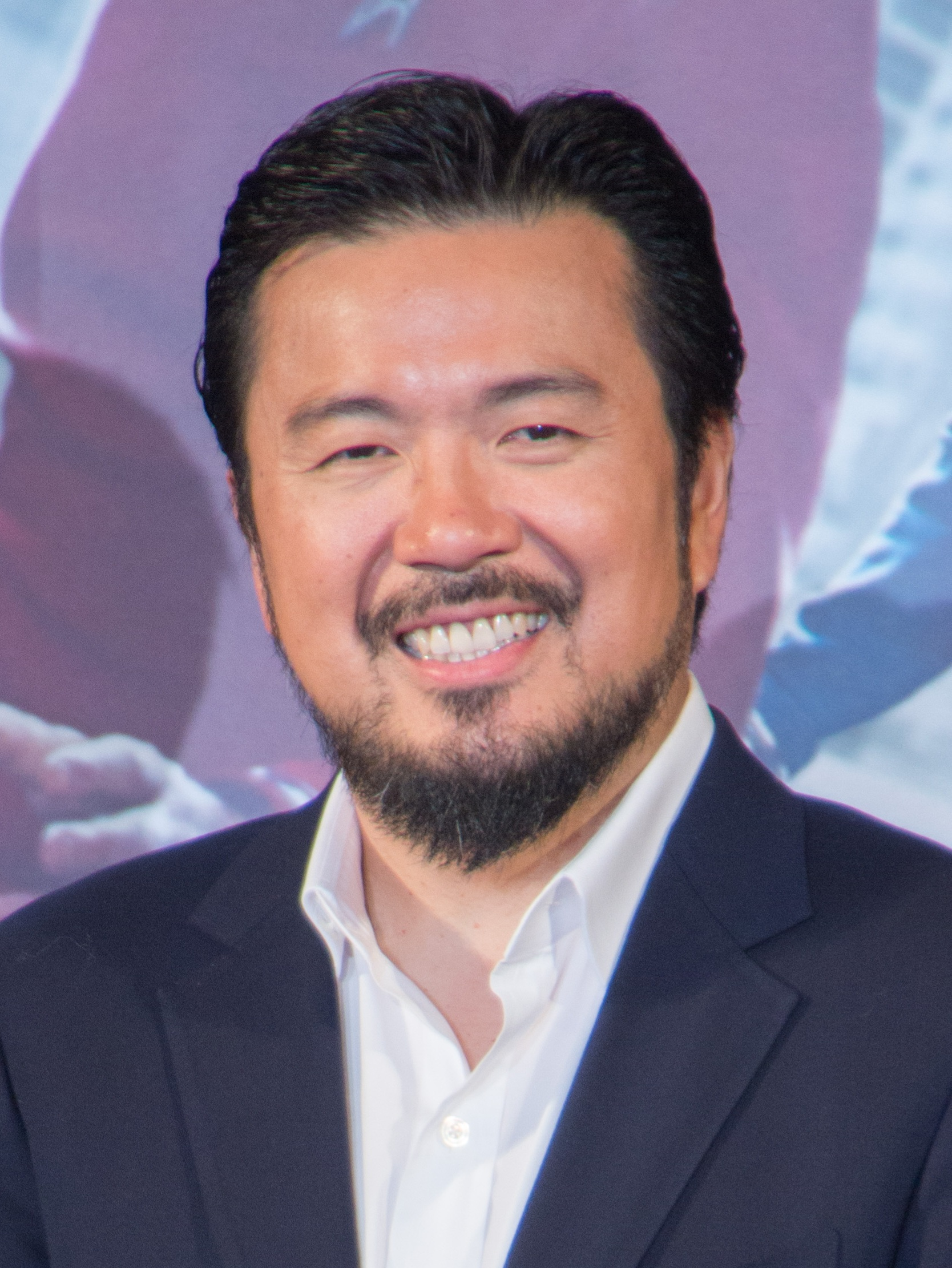
Lin at the premiere of Star Trek Beyond in 2016

Lin co-wrote and co-produced the China-U.S. action-comedy co-production Hollywood Adventures (2015), starring Huang Xiaoming, Tong Dawei and Zhao Wei.

Lin directed Star Trek Beyond, released in July 2016. The film is the third in the series' feature film reboot.

In October 2017, Lin was confirmed to be returning to the Fast & Furious franchise, directing F9. Originally set for an April 2020 release, the film was ultimately released in June 2021 after several delays due to the COVID-19 pandemic. Lin was then slated to return to direct Fast X (2023) and Fast XI (2027) but dropped out of directing the two films about a week into production and Louis Leterrier was hired to replace him.

=== Announced film projects ===
On April 8, 2003, Lin was set to direct the feature film adaptation of Brad Meltzer’s novel The Tenth Justice for Fox 2000, with Lin co-writing the adaptation with Fabian Marquez and Ernesto Foronda.

On August 2, 2004, Lin was set to direct the American remake of the Park Chan-wook film Oldboy for Universal Pictures, with Lin co-writing the script alongside Ernesto Foronda and Fabian Marquez. The film was eventually directed by Spike Lee.

On September 22, 2009, Lin was hired to direct the reboot of Highlander with Art Marcum and Matt Holloway writing the screenplay, Neal H. Moritz producing the movie with Lin and Summit Entertainment and Lionsgate Films set to distribute; the project is now to be directed by Chad Stahelski, with a May 2025 start date.

On April 26, 2011, Lin was set to direct the fifth Terminator with Arnold Schwarzenegger attached to star and Michael Costigan and Jewerl Ross producing the film. However, in September, Lin left the project due to scheduling conflicts with Fast & Furious 6. Alan Taylor took over directing duties on the project, which was ultimately titled Terminator Genisys.

On June 3, 2011, Lin was set to produce a sci-fi crime thriller movie directed by Robert Glickert which Glickert pitched to Universal Pictures, with Lin and Scott Stuber producing for Universal. Later that December, Daniel Casey was hired to write the movie.

On August 22, 2011, Lin was set to direct the feature film adaptation of B. Clay Moore and Jeremy Haun's comic book The Leading Man with Lin and Elaine Chin producing through Barnstorm Entertainment for Universal Pictures.

On August 22, 2011, Lin was set to direct a WW2 movie about the 442nd Infantry Regiment with Lin and Elaine Chin producing through Barnstorm Entertainment for Universal Pictures.

On August 22, 2011, Lin was set to direct The Brigands of Rattleborge, a Western thriller written by S. Craig Zahler with Lin and Elaine Chin producing through Barnstorm Entertainment with Bradley Fischer’s Mythology Entertainment. On August 29, 2012, Park Chan-wook was ultimately hired to direct “The Brigands of Rattleborge” instead of Lin; in March 2019, Amazon Studios acquired the project, now entitled The Brigands of Rattlecreek with Matthew McConaughey in talks to star.

On August 22, 2011, Lin was set to direct the feature film adaptation of the Scott Heim’s novel We Disappear, with Lin and Elaine Chin producing through Barnstorm Entertainment.

On September 17, 2011, Lin was set to executive produce Pong, a sports comedy series with Michael Colton and John Aboud writing the series, based on Roger Bennett and Eli Horowitz’s illustrated novel “Everything You Know Is Pong,” with Colton and Aboud attached to produce the series with Vin Di Bona, Bruce Gersh, and Susan Levison through Sony Pictures Television, and NBC set to air the series.

On March 27, 2012, Lin was set to direct the American feature film adaptation of the manga Lone Wolf and Cub, with David Peoples and Janet Beebe Peoples writing the screenplay, Elizabeth Grave, Joshua Long, and Roberto Grande producing through 1212 Entertainment in cooperation with Kamala Films. In June 2016, Variety announced that producer Steven Paul's SP International Pictures had acquired the rights to produce a live-action English-language feature film remake of the "iconic" manga Lone Wolf and Cub in an article where Lin went unmentioned. In July 2016, Lin mentioned that he was re-attached as the director for an adaptation of the manga, and that he plans to have a predominantly Asian cast, saying

five-to-ten years ago, they would have wanted Keanu Reeves to play the dad. I think the cool thing about it is that filmmaking has gone global. There's many ways to make a movie and I think Hollywood has to evolve.

As of April 2012, Variety was reporting that Lin was in talks to direct a feature film adaptation of David Henry Hwang's, play Chinglish.

In August 2012, Deadline was reporting that Lin may possibly direct a film based on the 1992 Los Angeles riots entitled L.A. Riots for Universal Studios, with Brian Grazer producing.

On October 29, 2012, Lin was set to direct Morgan Jurgenson and Alex Ankeles’ sci-fi comedy screenplay Subdivision, with Lin and Elaine Chin producing through Barnstorm Entertainment and Universal Pictures distributing the film.

In November 2012, The Hollywood Reporter announced that Lin planned to direct a sci-fi film entitled Hibernation.

On February 19, 2013, Lin was set to direct the feature film adaptation of Patrick Lee’s novel Runner, with Lin producing with Elaine Chin, Michael De Luca and Pouya Shahbazian, and Warner Bros. set to distribute. On May 16, 2013, Adam Cozad was hired to write the adaptation of Runner.

On October 16, 2013, Lin was set to direct the pilot episode and executive produce a dramatic television series about a murder during the statehood of Hawaii, with Davey Holmes and Shawn Ryan writing the series and executive producing along with Perfect Storm Entertainment’s Marney Hochman and Danielle Woodrow to be released on Fox.

At the 2014 Sundance Film Festival, Lin acquired the narrative remake rights to the documentary, The Battered Bastards of Baseball, the adaptation of which he reportedly plans to self-finance and produce through his Perfect Storm banner.

On January 27, 2014, Lin was set to produce Toymaggedon, a four-quadrant movie that Tariq Merhab had the idea for, with Troy Craig Poon producing and financing through Perfect Storm as a co-production with Anonymous Content for 20th Century Fox to distribute.

In March 2014, Deadline and others reported Lin as having been slated to direct Times Square, based on The Black List script by Taylor Materne and Jacob Rubin, a crime thriller about "set in the last days of the old Times Square, when it was transitioning from a seedy lawless Midtown Manhattan dump to a family-friendly corporate mecca; in that backdrop, when a secret from his past is unearthed, a young man's loyalties are divided between his neighborhood boss who raised him and the grizzled ex-cop who swore to protect him."

On April 9, 2014, Lin was set to direct Radiant Doors, an hour-long drama television series about refuges and a dystopian society, with Jeremy Doner writing the series based on Michael Swanwick's short story, and Lin producing the series with Danielle Woodrow, Troy Craig Poon, Ryan Andolina and Gaumont for WGN to premiere.

In March 2015, Deadline reported Lin's plans to direct a 3D remake of Shaolin Temple under his banner Perfect Storm Entertainment, which focuses more on projects in China.

On September 28, 2016, Lin was set to direct and produce the feature film adaptation of the Hot Wheels toy brand with Troy Craig Poon producing and financing through Perfect Storm for Legendary Entertainment. On January 30, 2019, it was announced that Mattel had taken the project to Warner Bros. Pictures after the option on the rights expired, with Lin no longer involved with the project.

On March 16, 2017, Lin was set to direct Mark Heyman’s screenplay The Stand Off, a historical crime film about a SWAT team raiding the Black Panther Party, with Lin producing with Elaine Chin, Michael De Luca and Pouya Shahbazian, and Netflix set to distribute.

In September 2017, it was announced that Lin would be directing and developing a narrative version of the documentary Abacus: Small Enough to Jail by Steve James (Hoop Dreams), who serves as an executive producer on the narrative film, with award-winning playwright and House of Cards writer Kenneth Lin will be responsible for writing the screenplay.

On June 10, 2021, Lin was set to direct and executive produce a crime television series about bank heists in New York City, with Nick Wootton and Jake Coburn writing the series and JJ Bailey and Moira Kirland producing, as well as write certain episodes, along with Julie Plec and Emily Cummins for Universal Television, and on September 23, 2021, the series was entitled The Endgame.

On April 5, 2022, Lin was set to direct and executive produce a true crime television series about set in 1960's Hawaii entitled The Islands, with Matther Kaz Firpo and Ryan Firpo writing the series and executive producing along with Perfect Storm Entertainment, Steven Yeun’s Universal Remote and Universal Television to be released on Peacock.

In June 2022, Lin was announced to be directing the live-action film adaptation of One-Punch Man for Sony Pictures.

On October 18, 2022, Amazon Prime Video was said to be developing the series Seven Wonders, adapted from Ben Mezrich's novel by Adam Cozad, with Lin directing. Simu Liu was attached to star as an adventurer out to solve the mystery of the Seven Wonders of the Ancient World.

On December 15, 2022, Lin was set to executive produce a medical drama television series set on the moon, with Joshua Troke writing the series and producing along with Andrew Schneider, Sal Gatdula, and Mickey Fisher for Universal Television to premiere on NBC.

On March 26, 2023, it was reported that Lin was offered to direct the sequel to Spider-Man: No Way Home after Jon Watts left the project. On September 9, 2024, it was announced that the film would be directed by Destin Daniel Cretton.

On December 12, 2023, it was announced that Apple Original Films had acquired Two for the Money, a heist action thriller film to be directed and produced by Lin, and set to star Charlize Theron and Daniel Craig as two career thieves who commit three big jobs.

On April 12, 2024, Lin reportedly boarded to direct and produce Stakehorse for Amazon MGM Studios, based on the spec script by Justin Piasecki that was featured on The Black List. Though no plot details were disclosed, the film described as being a crime thriller. By December 2025, it was reported that he was no longer attached to the project.

On March 7, 2025, it was announced that Lin would direct and produce the film adaptation of BRZRKR for Netflix. The film will be written by Mattson Tomlin and star Keanu Reeves (who co-created the comic with Matt Kindt and Ron Garney)

On December 1, 2025, Lin was announced to direct and produce a film based on the Helldivers video game franchise for Sony Pictures and PlayStation Productions. The script was written by Gary Dauberman. In February 2026, it was announced that Jason Momoa would star in the film, with Sony set to release the film in theaters on November 10, 2027.

=== Television work ===
Lin directed three episodes on the first season of the NBC comedy series Community between 2009 and 2010, which include "Modern Warfare", "Interpretive Dance", and "Introduction to Statistics". For his work on the show, Lin was nominated for two NAACP Image Awards for Outstanding Directing in a Comedy Series. In September 2011, Lin and his production company Barnstorm Pictures signed a first-look deal with Sony Pictures Television, who produced Community.

In October 2013, Deadline announced that Lin would be directing the pilot of Scorpion, a CBS drama produced by Roberto Orci and Alex Kurtzman. The series is about an eccentric genius who leads an international team of super-intelligent experts tasked with guarding against complex threats of the modern age. The pilot would be based on the real life of information technologist Walter O'Brien. In addition to directing the first episode, Lin serves as one of the series executive producers, along with Nick Santora.

Lin directed the first two episodes in 2015 of the second season of True Detective, "The Western Book of the Dead" (S02E01) and "Night Finds You" (S02E02).

In December 2018, Lin signed an overall TV deal with Apple, Inc., departing from his deal with Sony Pictures Television. In the fall of 2020, Lin's Perfect Storm Entertainment signed an overall film and television first look deal with Universal Studios.

Lin also serves as Executive Producer of the series Warrior based on the writings of Bruce Lee.

== Other projects ==
In 2009, Lin started the Asian American blog YOMYOMF which stands for "You Offend Me You Offend My Family." It was adapted into a YouTube channel in 2011.

In 2022, Lin set a joint venture with (art)ificial, the art and tech studio behind the NFT sci-fi collection Galaxy Eggs, with the intention to be the first company to build a Hollywood franchise from original NFT art.

== Personal life ==
Lin has a son, Okwe, who has made cameo appearances in several of his movies.

== Filmography ==
Film

| Year | Title | Director | Producer | Writer | Notes |
|---|---|---|---|---|---|
| 1997 | Shopping for Fangs | Yes | No | Yes | Co-directed with Quentin Lee; Also editor |
| 2002 | Better Luck Tomorrow | Yes | Yes | Yes | Also editor |
| 2006 | Annapolis | Yes | No | No | |
| 2006 | The Fast and the Furious: Tokyo Drift | Yes | No | No | Also executive soundtrack producer |
| 2007 | Finishing the Game | Yes | Yes | Yes | |
| 2009 | Fast & Furious | Yes | No | No | Also executive soundtrack producer |
| 2011 | Fast Five | Yes | Executive | No | Also executive soundtrack producer |
| 2013 | Fast & Furious 6 | Yes | Executive | No | |
| 2015 | Hollywood Adventures | No | Yes | Yes | |
| 2016 | Star Trek Beyond | Yes | Yes | No | |
| 2021 | F9 | Yes | Yes | Yes | |
| 2023 | Fast X | No | Yes | Yes | Replaced as director by Louis Leterrier |
| 2025 | Last Days | Yes | Yes | No | |

Executive producer

- Yellow Face (2013)
- Space Jam: A New Legacy (2021)

Television

| Year | Title | Director | Executive Producer | Episodes directed |
|---|---|---|---|---|
| 2009–2010 | Community | Yes | No | "Introduction to Statistics" "Interpretive Dance" "Modern Warfare" |
| 2014–2018 | Scorpion | Yes | Yes | "Pilot" |
| 2015 | True Detective | Yes | No | "The Western Book of the Dead" "Night Finds You" |
| 2017–2025 | S.W.A.T. | Yes | Yes | "Pilot" |
| 2018–2024 | Magnum P.I. | Yes | Yes | "Pilot" |
| 2019–2023 | Warrior | No | Yes | |
| 2022 | The Endgame | Yes | Yes | "Pilot" |

== See also ==
- List of Taiwanese Americans
