= Daisuke Suzuki (actor) =

Japanese actor (born 1972)

Daisuke Suzuki (鈴木 大介, Suzuki Daisuke; born June 17, 1972) is a Japanese actor known for his work in commercials, cartoons, and video games. Since 2005, he has voiced the role of Toshi Yoshida on Fox and TBS's American Dad!.

Beyond American Dad!, Suzuki's other credits include Hibakusha, Tales From The Dead, Pound Puppies, and The Hillz.

Suzuki has provided additional voice work for video games such as Call of Duty: Advanced Warfare, Tomb Raider, and The Secret World.

In a 2011 interview with producer Steve Nguyen for Asiance Magazine, Suzuki said that once he completed his university studies in Japan, he made the decision to move to the United States in order to further his education. After graduating from the University of California, Santa Barbara with a bachelor's degree in Film Studies, Suzuki decided to pursue acting as a full-time career.

== Filmography ==
=== Film ===
Year	Title	Role	Notes
2004	The Hillz	Asian Gangster	Direct-to-video
2005	Hit Me	Tao	
2008	Tales from the Dead	Sheriff Harada	
2011	Happy Birthday to Me	The Curator	Short film
2012	Get Cindy	Asian Business Man #2	Short film
2012	Hibakusha	Father (voice)	
2015	I Am a Gangster	Ito	
2019	In Full Bloom	Masahiro's Trainer	

=== Television ===
Year	Title	Role	Notes
2005–present	American Dad!	Toshi (voice)	
2011	Pound Puppies	Mr. Sasaki	Episode: "Toyoshiko! Bark Friend Machine"
2017	Jeff & Some Aliens	Japanese Manager #2	Episode: "Jeff & Some Preteen Girls"
2019	We Bare Bears	Additional Voices (voice)	Episode: "Ramen"
2020	Bless the Harts	Hiroki Kakatani	Episode: "Invasion of the Potty Snatcher"

=== Video games ===
Year	Title	Role	Notes
2005	Age of Empires III	Various	
2008	Call of Duty: World at War – Final Fronts		
2013	Tomb Raider	Oni, General, Japanese Soldier	
2014	The Secret War	Masao Tanaka	
2014	Call of Duty: Advanced Warfare	Additional Voices	
2021	Call of Duty: Vanguard	Voice Cast	
