= William Frederick Knight =

American actor (1933–2022)

- Born: December 6, 1933
- Died: November 8, 2022 (aged 88); North Hollywood, California, U.S.
- Other names: William Knight; William Frederick; Frederick Knight
- Occupation: Actor
- Years active: 1966–2022

William Frederick Knight (December 6, 1933 – November 8, 2022), sometimes credited as William Knight, William Frederick, or Frederick Knight, was an American actor who lent his voice to the English dubs of anime and video games. He was often cast in the role of a wise old man, such as in Ghost in the Shell (as Daisuke Aramaki), The Big O (as Gordon Rosewater), Paranoia Agent (as the old man), and Eureka Seven (as Kuzemi, one of the three Sages). He played similar archetypes in live-action roles in television and short films, including I Think You Should Leave with Tim Robinson and The League of STEAM. He was a recurring actor in sketches on the G4 series Attack of the Show and the show Dhar Mann.

Knight died in North Hollywood, California on November 8, 2022, at the age of 88.

== Voice roles ==
=== Anime ===
- Amazing Nurse Nanako – General, Griffith
- Carried by the Wind: Tsukikage Ran – Denkichi's Master
- Cowboy Bebop – Old Man (Session 2: "Stray Dog Strut")
- DearS – Grandfather
- El Hazard – The Magnificent World – Dr. Schtalubaugh
- El Hazard 2 – The Magnificent World – Dr. Schtalubaugh
- El Hazard: The Alternative World – Dr. Schtalubaugh
- El Hazard: The Wanderers – Dr. Schtalubaugh, Captain of the Guard
- Ergo Proxy – J.J. (Ep. 11)
- Eureka Seven – Kuzemi
- Fake – Leonard Henry
- Freedom Project – Alan
- Gad Guard – Gary
- Gankutsuou: The Count of Monte Cristo – Luigi Vampa
- Ghost in the Shell: SAC 2045 – Daisuke Aramaki
- Ghost in the Shell: Stand Alone Complex – Daisuke Aramaki
- Ghost in the Shell: Stand Alone Complex 2nd GIG – Daisuke Aramaki
- Gungrave – Dr. Tokioka, Butler Tokioka
- GUNxSWORD – Carlos (Eps. 3, 26)
- Haibane Renmei – Watchmaker
- Heat Guy J – Grandpa
- Hellsing – Father Rinaldo
- Hellsing Ultimate – Father (Ep. 1, 3)
- Hibakusha – Colonel Paul Tibbets
- Ikki Tousen – Choko
- Immortal Grand Prix – Ichi
- JoJo's Bizarre Adventure: Stone Ocean – Kenzou
- Kamichu! – Chairman of God Association (Ep. 7)
- Kurokami – Keita's grandfather
- L/R: Licensed by Royalty – Lord Miralio, Professor Freud
- Mahoromatic: Something More Beautiful – Jils
- Mars Daybreak – Doze
- Mermaid Forest – Toba Islander
- Mezzo Forte – Emoto
- Naruto – Hyuga Elder Sukeza (Ep. 153)
- Naruto Shippuden – Danzō Shimura
- New Getter Robo – Bonze
- NieA 7 – Butcher, Newscaster, Newspaper Man, Old Alien
- Nura: Rise of the Yokai Clan – Nurarihyon
- Outlaw Star – Ctarl-Ctarl Governor
- Overman King Gainer – Gach
- Paranoia Agent – Old Man
- Planetes – Father-In-Law
- R.O.D -The TV- – Irving (Ep. 5), Shop Owner A, Teacher (Ep. 6)
- Rumic Theater – Old Man, Pops
- Samurai Champloo – Daigoro
- Spirit of Wonder – Cooper
- Spirit of Wonder Scientific Boys Club – Cooper
- Starship Girl Yamamoto Yohko II – Swift
- Strawberry Eggs – Tofu Kuji
- Street Fighter II V – Master Yo Sen-ko (Animaze dub)
- Texhnolyze – Old Man 1, Tsujinaka
- The Adventures of Mini-Goddess – Crawl Space Boss, Narrator
- The Big O – Gordon Rosewater
- The Melody of Oblivion – Old Man Tsunagi
- The Third: The Girl with the Blue Eye – Dr. Nor
- The Twelve Kingdoms – Genkai
- Tokko – Taishi
- Trigun – Old Man (Ep. 5)
- Wolf's Rain – Old Wolf (Ep. 5)
- Yashahime: Princess Half-Demon – Grandpa

=== Films ===
- Akira – Miyako (Pioneer/Animaze dub)
- Appleseed – Elder
- Cowboy Bebop: The Movie – Van Dann
- Ghost in the Shell – Section 9 Department Chief Aramaki
- Ghost in the Shell: Stand Alone Complex: Solid State Society – Daisuke Aramaki
- Ghost in the Shell 2: Innocence – Daisuke Aramaki
- Metropolis – Notarlin
- Street Fighter Alpha – Monk
- Mega Monster Battle: Ultra Galaxy – Shin Hayata/Ultraman
- Ultraman Zero: The Revenge of Belial – Ultraman
- Ultraman Saga – Shin Hayata/Ultraman

=== Video games ===
- The Darkness – Frank Rottenberg
- Defiance – Varus Soleptor
- Ghost in the Shell – Daisuke Aramaki
- Ghost in the Shell: Stand Alone Complex – Daisuke Aramaki
- Naruto series – Danzo Shimura
- Prince of Persia: The Sands of Time – Sultan of Azad
- Sengoku Basara: Samurai Heroes – Hojo Ujimasa
- WildStar – Dorian Walker, Pell, Torax
- World of Final Fantasy – Adamantoise

== Television ==
Year	Title	Role	Notes
1966	Star Trek: The Original Series	Amorous Crewman	S1:E4, "The Naked Time"
1996	Power Rangers Zeo	Old Billy Cranston	Episodes 47 & 48, "Rangers of two Worlds"
