= List of American films of 2022 =

This is a list of American films released in 2022.

The 2022 release schedule includes numerous notable films that were originally scheduled for release in 2020 and 2021, but were postponed due to the COVID-19 pandemic.

== Box office ==
The highest-grossing American films released in 2022, by domestic box office gross revenue, are as follows:

Highest-grossing films of 2022
| Rank | Title | Distributor | Domestic gross |
|---|---|---|---|
| 1 | Top Gun: Maverick | Paramount | $718,732,821 |
| 2 | Avatar: The Way of Water | 20th Century | $684,075,767 |
| 3 | Black Panther: Wakanda Forever | Disney | $453,829,060 |
| 4 | Doctor Strange in the Multiverse of Madness | Disney | $411,331,607 |
| 5 | Jurassic World Dominion | Universal | $376,851,080 |
| 6 | Minions: The Rise of Gru | Universal | $369,695,210 |
| 7 | The Batman | Warner Bros. | $369,345,583 |
| 8 | Thor: Love and Thunder | Disney | $343,256,830 |
| 9 | Sonic the Hedgehog 2 | Paramount | $190,872,904 |
| 10 | Puss in Boots: The Last Wish | Universal | $185,535,345 |

== January–March ==
| Opening | | Title | Production company | Cast and crew | Ref. |
|---|---|---|---|---|---|
| J A N U A R Y | 7 | The 355 | Universal Pictures / Freckle Films / FilmNation Entertainment | Simon Kinberg (director/screenplay); Theresa Rebeck (screenplay); Jessica Chastain, Penélope Cruz, Fan Bingbing, Diane Kruger, Lupita Nyong'o, Édgar Ramírez, Sebastian Stan | |
| J A N U A R Y | 7 | The Legend of La Llorona | Saban Films / Ageless Pictures | Patricia Harris Seeley (director); José Prendes (screenplay); Autumn Reeser, Danny Trejo, Antonio Cupo, Zamia Fardiño | |
| J A N U A R Y | 7 | The Commando | Saban Films / Premiere Entertainment | Asif Akbar (director); Koji Steven Sakai (screenplay); Mickey Rourke, Michael Jai White | |
| J A N U A R Y | 7 | American Siege | Vertical Entertainment | Edward John Drake (director/screenplay); Timothy V. Murphy, Bruce Willis, Rob Gough, Johann Urb, Anna Hindman, Johnny Messner, Cullen G. Chambers, Janet Jones | |
| J A N U A R Y | 14 | Scream | Paramount Pictures / Spyglass Media Group / Radio Silence Productions | Matt Bettinelli-Olpin, Tyler Gillett (director); James Vanderbilt, Guy Busick (screenplay); Melissa Barrera, Mason Gooding, Jenna Ortega, Jack Quaid, Marley Shelton, Courteney Cox, David Arquette, Neve Campbell | |
| J A N U A R Y | 14 | Hotel Transylvania: Transformania | Amazon Studios / Columbia Pictures / Sony Pictures Animation | Derek Drymon, Jennifer Kluska (directors); Amos Vernon, Nunzio Randazzo, Genndy Tartakovsky (screenplay); Andy Samberg, Selena Gomez, Kathryn Hahn, Jim Gaffigan, Steve Buscemi, Molly Shannon, David Spade, Keegan-Michael Key, Brian Hull, Fran Drescher | |
| J A N U A R Y | 14 | Shattered | Lionsgate / Grindstone Entertainment Group | Luis Prieto (director); David Loughery (screenplay); Cameron Monaghan, Frank Grillo, Lilly Krug, John Malkovich | |
| J A N U A R Y | 18 | The Royal Treatment | Netflix | Rick Jacobson (director); Holly Hester (screenplay); Laura Marano, Mena Massoud | |
| J A N U A R Y | 21 | Redeeming Love | Universal Pictures / Pinnacle Peak Pictures | D. J. Caruso (director/screenplay); Francine Rivers (screenplay); Abigail Cowen, Tom Lewis, Logan Marshall-Green, Wu Ke-xi, Famke Janssen, Nina Dobrev, Eric Dane | |
| J A N U A R Y | 21 | The King's Daughter | Gravitas Ventures / Bliss Media | Sean McNamara (director); Berry Berman, James Schamus (screenplay); Pierce Brosnan, Kaya Scodelario, Benjamin Walker, William Hurt, Rachel Griffiths, Fan Bingbing | |
| J A N U A R Y | 21 | The Tiger Rising | Highland Film Group / The Avenue | Ray Giarratana (director/screenplay); Christian Convery, Madalen Mills, Katharine McPhee, Sam Trammell, Dennis Quaid, Queen Latifah, Ahmad Harhash | |
| J A N U A R Y | 21 | Hellblazers | Tubi | Justin Lee (director/screenplay); Bruce Dern, Billy Zane, Tony Todd, Adrienne Barbeau | |
| J A N U A R Y | 25 | The Fallout | HBO Max / Warner Bros. Pictures / New Line Cinema | Megan Park (director/screenplay); Jenna Ortega, Maddie Ziegler, Julie Bowen, John Ortiz, Niles Fitch, Will Ropp, Shailene Woodley | |
| J A N U A R Y | 28 | Home Team | Netflix / Happy Madison Productions | Charles Kinnane, Daniel Kinnane (director); Chris Titone, Keith Blum (screenplay); Kevin James, Taylor Lautner, Rob Schneider, Jackie Sandler, Tait Blum | |
| J A N U A R Y | 28 | The Ice Age Adventures of Buck Wild | Disney+ / Walt Disney Pictures / 20th Century Animation | John C. Donkin (director); Jim Hecht, William Schifrin, Ray DeLaurentis (screenplay); Simon Pegg, Utkarsh Ambudkar, Justina Machado, Vincent Tong, Aaron Harris, Dominique Jennings, Jake Green, Sean Kenin Elias-Reyes, Skyler Stone | |
| J A N U A R Y | 28 | Clean | IFC Films | Paul Solet (director/screenplay); Adrien Brody (screenplay); Adrien Brody | |
| F E B R U A R Y | 4 | Jackass Forever | Paramount Pictures / MTV Entertainment Studios | Jeff Tremaine (director/screenplay); Spike Jonze, Johnny Knoxville, Steve-O, Chris Pontius, Preston Lacy, Dave England, Jason Acuña, Ehren McGhehey, Zach Holmes, Rachel Wolfson, Jasper Dolphin, Eric Manaka, Sean "Poopies" McInerney, Dimitry Elyashkevich, Sean Cliver, Rick Kosick, Trip Taylor, J.P. Blackmon, Eric André, Derrick Beckles, Nick Kreiss, Sarah Sherman, Colton Dunn, Andrew Weinberg, Bam Margera (screenplay); Johnny Knoxville, Steve-O, Chris Pontius, Dave England, Ehren McGhehey, Jason Acuña, Preston Lacy, Jasper Dolphin, Sean "Poopies" McInerney, Zach Holmes, Eric Manaka, Rachel Wolfson | |
| F E B R U A R Y | 4 | Moonfall | Lionsgate / Huayi Brothers / Centropolis Entertainment / AGC Studios | Roland Emmerich (director/screenplay); Harald Kloser, Spenser Cohen (screenplay); Halle Berry, Patrick Wilson, John Bradley, Michael Peña, Charlie Plummer, Kelly Yu, Carolina Bartczak, Donald Sutherland | |
| F E B R U A R Y | 4 | Last Looks | RLJE Films | Tim Kirkby (director); Howard Michael Gould (screenplay); Charlie Hunnam, Mel Gibson, Morena Baccarin, Lucy Fry, Rupert Friend, Dominic Monaghan, Jacob Scipio, Clancy Brown | |
| F E B R U A R Y | 4 | The Long Night | Well Go USA Entertainment | Rich Ragsdale (director); Robert Sheppe, Mark Young (screenplay); Scout Taylor-Compton, Nolan Gerard Funk, Jeff Fahey, Deborah Kara Unger | |
| F E B R U A R Y | 8 | Kimi | HBO Max / Warner Bros. Pictures / New Line Cinema | Steven Soderbergh (director); David Koepp (screenplay); Zoë Kravitz, Rita Wilson, Jaime Camil, India de Beaufort, Emily Kuroda, Byron Bowers, Derek DelGaudio, Betsy Brantley | |
| F E B R U A R Y | 8 | Shut In | Voltage Pictures | D. J. Caruso (director); Melanie Toast (screenplay); Rainey Qualley, Jake Horowitz, Luciana VanDette, Vincent Gallo | |
| F E B R U A R Y | 11 | Death on the Nile | 20th Century Studios / Scott Free Productions | Kenneth Branagh (director); Michael Green (screenplay); Tom Bateman, Annette Bening, Kenneth Branagh, Russell Brand, Ali Fazal, Dawn French, Gal Gadot, Armie Hammer, Rose Leslie, Emma Mackey, Sophie Okonedo, Jennifer Saunders, Letitia Wright | |
| F E B R U A R Y | 11 | Marry Me | Universal Pictures / Perfect World Pictures / Peacock | Kat Coiro (director); John Rogers, Tami Sagher, Harper Dill (screenplay); Jennifer Lopez, Owen Wilson, Maluma, John Bradley, Chloe Coleman, Sarah Silverman | |
| F E B R U A R Y | 11 | Blacklight | Open Road Films / Briarcliff Entertainment | Mark Williams (director/screenplay); Nick May (screenplay); Liam Neeson, Emmy Raver-Lampman, Taylor John Smith, Aidan Quinn | |
| F E B R U A R Y | 11 | I Want You Back | Amazon Studios | Jason Orley (director); Isaac Aptaker, Elizabeth Berger (screenplay); Charlie Day, Jenny Slate, Scott Eastwood, Manny Jacinto, Clark Backo, Gina Rodriguez | |
| F E B R U A R Y | 11 | Tall Girl 2 | Netflix | Emily Ting (director); Sam Wolfson (screenplay); Ava Michelle, Griffin Gluck, Sabrina Carpenter, Anjelika Washington, Luke Eisner, Clara Wilsey, Rico Paris, Jan Luis Castellanos, Angela Kinsey, Steve Zahn | |
| F E B R U A R Y | 11 | The Sky Is Everywhere | Apple TV+ / A24 | Josephine Decker (director); Jandy Nelson (screenplay); Grace Kaufman, Pico Alexander, Jacques Colimon, Cherry Jones, Jason Segel | |
| F E B R U A R Y | 11 | The In Between | Paramount+ / Paramount Players | Arie Posin (director); Marc Klein (screenplay); Joey King, Kyle Allen | |
| F E B R U A R Y | 15 | Fistful of Vengeance | Netflix / Living Films | Roel Reiné (director); Cameron Litvack, Jessica Chou, Yalun Tu (screenplay); Iko Uwais, Lewis Tan, Lawrence Kao, Pearl Thusi, Francesca Corney, JuJu Chan, Jason Tobin, Rhatha Phongam, Simon Kuke | |
| F E B R U A R Y | 18 | Uncharted | Columbia Pictures / PlayStation Productions / Atlas Entertainment / A2 Productions | Ruben Fleischer (director); Rafe Judkins, Art Marcum, Matt Holloway (screenplay); Tom Holland, Mark Wahlberg, Sophia Ali, Tati Gabrielle, Antonio Banderas | |
| F E B R U A R Y | 18 | Dog | Metro-Goldwyn-Mayer / FilmNation Entertainment | Channing Tatum (director); Reid Carolin (director/screenplay); Channing Tatum, Jane Adams, Kevin Nash, Q'orianka Kilcher, Ethan Suplee, Emmy Raver-Lampman, Nicole LaLiberte | |
| F E B R U A R Y | 18 | Texas Chainsaw Massacre | Netflix / Legendary Pictures / Bad Hombre | David Blue Garcia (director); Chris Thomas Devlin (screenplay); Sarah Yarkin, Elsie Fisher, Mark Burham, Moe Dunford, Nell Hudson, Jessica Allain, Olwen Fouéré, Jacob Latimore, Alice Krige | |
| F E B R U A R Y | 18 | The Cursed | Elevation Pictures / LD Entertainment | Sean Ellis (director/screenplay); Boyd Holbrook, Kelly Reilly, Alistair Petrie, Roxane Duran, Áine Rose Daly | |
| F E B R U A R Y | 18 | A Fairy Tale After All | Vertical Entertainment | Erik Peter Carlson (director/screenplay); Emily Shenaut, Brian Hull, Gabriel Burrafato, Bridget Winder, Timothy N. Kopacz, Anna Brisbin | |
| F E B R U A R Y | 25 | Cyrano | Metro-Goldwyn-Mayer / Bron Creative / Working Title Films | Joe Wright (director); Erica Schmidt (screenplay); Peter Dinklage, Haley Bennett, Kelvin Harrison Jr., Ben Mendelsohn | |
| F E B R U A R Y | 25 | Studio 666 | Open Road Films / Briarcliff Entertainment | B. J. McDonnell (director); Jeff Buhler, Rebecca Hughes (screenplay); Dave Grohl, Nate Mendel, Pat Smear, Taylor Hawkins, Chris Shiflett, Rami Jaffe, Whitney Cummings, Leslie Grossman, Will Forte, Jenna Ortega, Jeff Garlin | |
| F E B R U A R Y | 25 | A Madea Homecoming | Netflix / Tyler Perry Studios | Tyler Perry (director/screenplay); Tyler Perry, Cassi Davis, David Mann, Tamela Mann, Gabrielle Dennis, Brendan O'Carroll | |
| F E B R U A R Y | 25 | No Exit | Hulu / 20th Century Studios | Damien Power (director); Andrew Barrer, Gabriel Ferrari (screenplay); Havana Rose Liu, Danny Ramirez, David Rysdahl, Dale Dickey, Mila Harris, Dennis Haysbert | |
| F E B R U A R Y | 25 | I'll Find You | Music, War and Love / FR Productions / Bovenkon | Martha Coolidge (director); David S. Ward, Bozenna Intrator (screenplay); Adelaide Clemens, Leo Suter, Stephen Dorff, Connie Nielsen, Stellan Skarsgård | |
| F E B R U A R Y | 25 | Gasoline Alley | Saban Films | Edward John Drake (director/screenplay); Tom Sierchio (screenplay); Devon Sawa, Bruce Willis, Luke Wilson | |
| M A R C H | 4 | The Batman | Warner Bros. Pictures / DC Films / 6th & Idaho | Matt Reeves (director/screenplay); Peter Craig (screenplay); Robert Pattinson, Zoë Kravitz, Paul Dano, Jeffrey Wright, John Turturro, Peter Sarsgaard, Andy Serkis, Colin Farrell | |
| M A R C H | 4 | After Yang | A24 / Showtime / Cinereach | Kogonada (director/screenplay); Colin Farrell, Jodie Turner-Smith, Justin H. Min, Malea Emma Tjandrawidjaja, Haley Lu Richardson | |
| M A R C H | 4 | Fresh | Hulu / Searchlight Pictures / Hyperobject Industries / Legendary Pictures | Mimi Cave (director); Lauryn Kahn (screenplay); Daisy Edgar-Jones, Sebastian Stan, Jonica T. Gibbs, Charlotte Le Bon, Andrea Bang, Dayo Okeniyi, Brett Dier | |
| M A R C H | 4 | A Day to Die | Vertical Entertainment | Wes Miller (director/screenplay); Rab Berry, Scott Mallace (screenplay); Kevin Dillon, Bruce Willis, Gianni Capaldi, Brooke Butler, Leon Robinson, Frank Grillo | |
| M A R C H | 8 | The Hyperions | The Daily Wire / Saban Films | Jon McDonald (director/screenplay); Cary Elwes, Penelope Mitchell, Elaine Tan, Alphonso McAuley | |
| M A R C H | 11 | The Adam Project | Netflix / Skydance Media / 21 Laps Entertainment / Maximum Effort | Shawn Levy (director); Jonathan Tropper, T. S. Nowlin, Jennifer Flackett, Mark Levin (screenplay); Ryan Reynolds, Walker Scobell, Mark Ruffalo, Jennifer Garner, Catherine Keener, Zoe Saldaña | |
| M A R C H | 11 | Turning Red | Disney+ / Walt Disney Pictures / Pixar Animation Studios | Domee Shi (director/screenplay); Julia Cho (screenplay); Rosalie Chiang, Sandra Oh, Ava Morse, Hyein Park, Maitreyi Ramakrishnan, Orion Lee, Wai Ching Ho, Tristan Allerick Chen, James Hong | |
| M A R C H | 11 | Tyson's Run | Collide Distribution / Iconic Events Releasing | Kim Bass (director/screenplay); Rory Cochrane, Amy Smart, Major Dodson, Layla Felder, Claudia Zevallos, Reno Wilson, Barkhad Abdi | |
| M A R C H | 15 | Rescued by Ruby | Netflix | Katt Shea (director); Karen Kanszen (screenplay); Grant Gustin, Scott Wolf, Kaylah Zander | |
| M A R C H | 18 | The Outfit | Focus Features / FilmNation Entertainment | Graham Moore (director/screenplay); Johnathan McClain (screenplay); Mark Rylance, Zoey Deutch, Johnny Flynn, Dylan O'Brien, Nikki Amuka-Bird, Simon Russell Beale | |
| M A R C H | 18 | Deep Water | Hulu / 20th Century Studios / Regency Enterprises / Entertainment One | Adrian Lyne (director); Zach Helm, Sam Levinson (screenplay); Ben Affleck, Ana de Armas | |
| M A R C H | 18 | Cheaper by the Dozen | Disney+ / Walt Disney Pictures / 20th Century Studios | Gail Lerner (director); Kenya Barris, Jenifer Rice-Genzuk Henry (screenplay); Gabrielle Union, Zach Braff, Erika Christensen, Timon Kyle Durrett | |
| M A R C H | 18 | Windfall | Netflix | Charlie McDowell (director); Justin Lader, Andrew Kevin Walker (screenplay); Lily Collins, Jesse Plemons, Jason Segel | |
| M A R C H | 18 | X | A24 / Bron Creative | Ti West (director/screenplay); Mia Goth, Jenna Ortega, Martin Henderson, Brittany Snow, Owen Campbell, Stephen Ure, Kid Cudi | |
| M A R C H | 18 | Umma | Stage 6 Films | Iris K. Shim (director/screenplay); Sandra Oh, Fivel Stewart, Dermot Mulroney, Odeya Rush, MeeWha Alana Lee, Tom Yi | |
| M A R C H | 18 | Alice | Vertical Entertainment / Roadside Attractions | Krystin Ver Linden (director/screenplay); Keke Palmer, Jonny Lee Miller, Common, Gaius Charles, Alicia Witt | |
| M A R C H | 18 | Master | Amazon Studios | Mariama Diallo (director/screenplay); Regina Hall, Zoe Renee, Amber Gray, Molly Bernard, Nike Kadri | |
| M A R C H | 18 | Measure of Revenge | Vertical Entertainment | Peyfa (director); Melissa Leo, Bella Thorne, Jake Weary, Kevin Corrigan, Benedict Samuel, Adrian Martinez | |
| M A R C H | 25 | The Lost City | Paramount Pictures / Fortis Films | Aaron and Adam Nee (directors/screenplay); Oren Uziel, Dana Fox (screenplay); Sandra Bullock, Channing Tatum, Daniel Radcliffe, Da'Vine Joy Randolph, Brad Pitt | |
| M A R C H | 25 | Everything Everywhere All at Once | A24 / AGBO / IAC Films | Daniels (directors/screenplay); Michelle Yeoh, Stephanie Hsu, Ke Huy Quan, Jenny Slate, Harry Shum Jr., James Hong, Jamie Lee Curtis | |
| M A R C H | 25 | Infinite Storm | Bleecker Street | Małgorzata Szumowska, Michał Englert (directors); Josh Rollins (screenplay); Naomi Watts, Billy Howle, Denis O'Hare, Parker Sawyers, Eliot Sumner | |
| M A R C H | 25 | 7 Days | Cinedigm / Duplass Brothers Productions | Roshan Sethi (director/screenplay); Karan Soni (screenplay); Karan Soni, Geraldine Viswanathan | |
| M A R C H | 31 | Moonshot | HBO Max / Warner Bros. Pictures / New Line Cinema | Chris Winterbauer (director); Max Taxe (screenplay); Cole Sprouse, Lana Condor, Mason Gooding, Emily Rudd, Zach Braff | |

== April–June ==
| Opening | | Title | Production company | Cast and crew | Ref. |
|---|---|---|---|---|---|
| A P R I L | 1 | Morbius | Columbia Pictures / Marvel Entertainment / A2 Productions | Daniel Espinosa (director); Matt Sazama, Burk Sharpless (screenplay); Jared Leto, Matt Smith, Adria Arjona, Jared Harris, Al Madrigal, Tyrese Gibson | |
| A P R I L | 1 | The Bubble | Netflix / Apatow Productions | Judd Apatow (director/screenplay); Pam Brady (screenplay); Karen Gillan, Iris Apatow, Vir Das, Fred Armisen, Maria Bakalova, David Duchovny, Keegan-Michael Key, Leslie Mann, Kate McKinnon, Pedro Pascal, Peter Serafinowicz, Guz Khan, Harry Trevaldwyn | |
| A P R I L | 1 | The Contractor | Paramount Pictures / STXfilms / Thunder Road Films | Tarik Saleh (director); J. P. Davis (screenplay); Chris Pine, Ben Foster, Gillian Jacobs, Eddie Marsan, J. D. Pardo, Florian Munteanu, Kiefer Sutherland | |
| A P R I L | 1 | Better Nate Than Ever | Disney+ / Walt Disney Pictures | Tim Federle (director/screenplay); Aria Brooks, Joshua Bassett, Michelle Federer, Rueby Wood, Norbert Leo Butz, Lisa Kudrow | |
| A P R I L | 1 | Apollo 10 1/2: A Space Age Childhood | Netflix / Netflix Animation | Richard Linklater (director/screenplay); Glen Powell, Zachary Levi, Jack Black | |
| A P R I L | 8 | Sonic the Hedgehog 2 | Paramount Pictures / Sega Sammy Group / Original Film | Jeff Fowler (director); Patrick Casey, Josh Miller, John Whittington (screenplay); James Marsden, Ben Schwartz, Tika Sumpter, Natasha Rothwell, Adam Pally, Shemar Moore, Idris Elba, Jim Carrey | |
| A P R I L | 8 | Ambulance | Universal Pictures / New Republic Pictures / Endeavor Content | Michael Bay (director); Chris Fedak (screenplay); Jake Gyllenhaal, Yahya Abdul-Mateen II, Eiza González | |
| A P R I L | 8 | All the Old Knives | Amazon Studios / Entertainment One / Chockstone Pictures | Janus Metz Pedersen (director); Olen Steinhauer (screenplay); Chris Pine, Thandiwe Newton, Laurence Fishburne, Jonathan Pryce, David Dawson | |
| A P R I L | 8 | Metal Lords | Netflix / Kingsgate Productions | Peter Sollett (director); D. B. Weiss (screenplay); Jaeden Martell, Isis Hainsworth, Adrian Greensmith, Brett Gelman, Noah Urrea, Joe Manganiello | |
| A P R I L | 13 | Father Stu | Columbia Pictures / CJ Entertainment | Rosalind Ross (director/screenplay); Mark Wahlberg, Mel Gibson, Jacki Weaver | |
| A P R I L | 15 | Fantastic Beasts: The Secrets of Dumbledore | Warner Bros. Pictures / Heyday Films | David Yates (director); J. K. Rowling, Steve Kloves (screenplay); Eddie Redmayne, Jude Law, Ezra Miller, Dan Fogler, Alison Sudol, Callum Turner, Jessica Williams, Katherine Waterston, Mads Mikkelsen | |
| A P R I L | 15 | Dual | RLJE Films / XYZ Films | Riley Stearns (director/screenplay); Karen Gillan, Beulah Koale, Theo James, Aaron Paul | |
| A P R I L | 15 | Titanic 666 | The Asylum / Tubi | Nick Lyon (director); Jacob Cooney, Jason White (screenplay); Jamie Bamber, Keesha Sharp, AnnaLynne McCord, Lydia Hearst, Joseph Gatt | |
| A P R I L | 22 | The Bad Guys | Universal Pictures / DreamWorks Animation | Pierre Perifel (director); Etan Cohen (screenplay); Sam Rockwell, Marc Maron, Awkwafina, Craig Robinson, Anthony Ramos, Richard Ayoade, Zazie Beetz, Alex Borstein, Lilly Singh | |
| A P R I L | 22 | The Unbearable Weight of Massive Talent | Lionsgate / Saturn Films | Tom Gormican (director/screenplay); Kevin Etten (screenplay); Nicolas Cage, Pedro Pascal, Sharon Horgan, Ike Barinholtz, Alessandra Mastronardi, Jacob Scipio, Neil Patrick Harris, Tiffany Haddish | |
| A P R I L | 22 | The Northman | Focus Features / Regency Enterprises / Perfect World Pictures | Robert Eggers (director/screenplay); Sjón (screenplay); Alexander Skarsgård, Nicole Kidman, Claes Bang, Anya Taylor-Joy, Gustav Lindh, Ethan Hawke, Björk, Willem Dafoe | |
| A P R I L | 22 | Polar Bear | Disney+ / Disneynature | Alastair Fothergill, Jeff Wilson (directors); Catherine Keener (narrator) | |
| A P R I L | 26 | The Survivor | HBO Films / Bron Studios / Endeavor Content / HBO Max | Barry Levinson (director); Justine Juel Gillmer (screenplay); Ben Foster, Vicky Krieps, Billy Magnussen, Peter Sarsgaard, John Leguizamo, Danny DeVito | |
| A P R I L | 29 | Memory | Open Road Films / Briarcliff Entertainment / Black Bear Pictures | Martin Campbell (director); Dario Scardapane (screenplay); Liam Neeson, Guy Pearce, Monica Bellucci, Taj Atwal, Ray Fearon, Harold Torres | |
| A P R I L | 29 | Crush | Hulu / LD Entertainment / 3 Arts Entertainment | Sammi Cohen (director); Kirsten King, Casey Rackham (screenplay); Rowan Blanchard, Auliʻi Cravalho, Isabella Ferreira | |
| A P R I L | 29 | Fortress: Sniper's Eye | Lionsgate | Josh Sternfeld (director); Alan Horsnail (screenplay); Jesse Metcalfe, Bruce Willis, Chad Michael Murray | |
| A P R I L | 29 | Corrective Measures | Tubi | Sean O'Reilly (director/screenplay); Bruce Willis, Michael Rooker | |
| A P R I L | 30 | Unconformity | Topiary Productions | Jonathan DiMaio (director); Jack Mulhern, Alex Oliver | |
| M A Y | 6 | Doctor Strange in the Multiverse of Madness | Marvel Studios | Sam Raimi (director); Michael Waldron (screenplay); Benedict Cumberbatch, Elizabeth Olsen, Chiwetel Ejiofor, Benedict Wong, Xochitl Gomez, Michael Stuhlbarg, Rachel McAdams | |
| M A Y | 6 | Along for the Ride | Netflix | Sofia Alvarez (director/screenplay); Emma Pasarow, Belmont Cameli, Kate Bosworth, Dermot Mulroney, Andie MacDowell | |
| M A Y | 6 | Marmaduke | Netflix | Mark A.Z. Dippé (director); Byron Kavanagh (screenplay); Pete Davidson, J. K. Simmons, David Koechner | |
| M A Y | 6 | Escape the Field | Lionsgate | Emerson Moore (director/screenplay); Joshua Dobkin, Sean Wathen (screenplay); Jordan Claire Robbins, Theo Rossi, Tahirah Sharif, Julian Feder, Elena Juatco, Shane West | |
| M A Y | 10 | Operation Mincemeat | Netflix / FilmNation Entertainment / See-Saw Films | John Madden (director); Michelle Ashford (screenplay); Colin Firth, Matthew Macfadyen, Kelly Macdonald, Penelope Wilton, Johnny Flynn, Jason Isaacs | |
| M A Y | 13 | Senior Year | Netflix / Paramount Pictures / Paramount Players | Alex Hardcastle (director); Andrew Knauer, Arthur Pielli, Brandon Scott Jones (screenplay); Rebel Wilson, Mary Holland, Sam Richardson, Zoë Chao, Justin Hartley, Chris Parnell | |
| M A Y | 13 | Firestarter | Universal Pictures / Blumhouse Productions / Peacock | Keith Thomas (director); Scott Teems (screenplay); Zac Efron, Ryan Kiera Armstrong, Sydney Lemmon, Kurtwood Smith, John Beasley, Michael Greyeyes, Gloria Reuben | |
| M A Y | 13 | Sneakerella | Disney+ / Disney Channel | Elizabeth Allen Rosenbaum (director); David Light, Joseph Raso, Tamara Chestna, Mindy Stern, George Gore II (screenplay); Chosen Jacobs, Lexi Underwood, Devyn Nekoda, Bryan Terrell Clark, Kolton Stewart, Hayward Leach, Robyn Alomar, Yvonne Senat Jones, Juan Chioran, John Salley | |
| M A Y | 13 | On the Count of Three | Orion Pictures / Annapurna Pictures | Jerrod Carmichael (director); Ari Katcher, Ryan Welch (screenplay); Jerrod Carmichael, Christopher Abbott, Tiffany Haddish, J. B. Smoove Lavell Crawford, Henry Winkler | |
| M A Y | 13 | Private Property | Lionsgate | Chadd Harbold (director/screenplay); Ashley Benson, Shiloh Fernandez | |
| M A Y | 13 | Family Camp | Roadside Attractions | Brian Cates (director/screenplay); Rene Gutteridge (screenplay); Eddie James, Tommy Woodard, Leigh-Allyn Baker, Gigi Orsillo | |
| M A Y | 13 | Montana Story | Bleecker Street | Scott McGehee, David Siegel (directors/screenplay); Haley Lu Richardson, Owen Teague, Gilbert Owuor, Kimberly Norris Guerrero, Eugene Brave Rock, Asivak Koostachin | |
| M A Y | 17 | Vendetta | Redbox Entertainment | Jared Cohn (director/screenplay); Clive Standen, Theo Rossi, Mike Tyson, Thomas Jane, Bruce Willis | |
| M A Y | 20 | Downton Abbey: A New Era | Focus Features / Perfect World Pictures / Carnival Films | Simon Curtis (director); Julian Fellowes (screenplay); Hugh Bonneville, Jim Carter, Michelle Dockery, Elizabeth McGovern, Maggie Smith, Imelda Staunton, Penelope Wilton | |
| M A Y | 20 | Chip 'n Dale: Rescue Rangers | Disney+ / Walt Disney Pictures / Mandeville Films | Akiva Schaffer (director); Dan Gregor, Doug Mand (screenplay); John Mulaney, Andy Samberg, KiKi Layne, Will Arnett, Eric Bana, Flula Borg, Dennis Haysbert, Keegan-Michael Key, Tress MacNeille, Tim Robinson, Seth Rogen, J. K. Simmons | |
| M A Y | 20 | Good Mourning | Open Road Films | Machine Gun Kelly, Mod Sun (directors/screenplay); Machine Gun Kelly, Mod Sun. GaTa, Zach Villa, Jenna Boyd, Becky G, Megan Fox, Dove Cameron | |
| M A Y | 20 | The Valet | Hulu / Pantelion Films | Richard Wong (director); Bob Fisher, Rob Greenberg (screenplay); Eugenio Derbez, Samara Weaving | |
| M A Y | 20 | Emergency | Amazon Studios / Temple Hill Entertainment | Carey Williams (director); K.D. Dávila (screenplay); RJ Cyler, Donald Elise Watkins, Sebastian Chacon | |
| M A Y | 27 | Top Gun: Maverick | Paramount Pictures / Skydance Media / Don Simpson/Jerry Bruckheimer Films | Joseph Kosinski (director); Ehren Kruger, Eric Warren Singer, Christopher McQuarrie (screenplay); Tom Cruise, Miles Teller, Jennifer Connelly, Jon Hamm, Glen Powell, Ed Harris, Val Kilmer | |
| M A Y | 27 | The Bob's Burgers Movie | 20th Century Studios / Bento Box Entertainment | Loren Bouchard (director/screenplay); Bernard Derriman (director); Nora Smith (screenplay); H. Jon Benjamin, Dan Mintz, Eugene Mirman, Larry Murphy, John Roberts, Kristen Schaal, David Wain, Zach Galifianakis, Kevin Kline | |
| M A Y | 27 | Zero Contact | Lionsgate | Rick Dugdale (director); Cam Cannon (screenplay); Anthony Hopkins, Chris Brochu, Aleks Paunovic, Veronica Ferres | |
| M A Y | 27 | A Chiara | Neon / Rai Cinema | Jonas Carpignano (director/screenplay); Swamy Rotolo, Claudio Rotolo, Grecia Rotolo, Carmela Fumo | |
| J U N E | 1 | South Park: The Streaming Wars | Paramount+ / Comedy Central | Trey Parker (director/screenplay); Trey Parker, Matt Stone, April Stewart, Kimberly Brooks, Adrien Beard, Vernon Chatman | |
| J U N E | 3 | Hollywood Stargirl | Disney+ / Walt Disney Pictures | Julia Hart (director/screenplay); Jordan Horowitz (screenplay); Grace VanderWaal, Elijah Richardson, Tyrel Jackson Williams, Judy Greer, Judd Hirsch, Uma Thurman | |
| J U N E | 3 | Benediction | Roadside Attractions / BBC Film | Terence Davies (director/screenplay); Jack Lowden, Peter Capaldi, Simon Russell Beale, Jeremy Irvine, Kate Phillips, Gemma Jones, Ben Daniels | |
| J U N E | 3 | Interceptor | Netflix | Matthew Reilly (director/screenplay); Stuart Beattie (screenplay); Elsa Pataky, Luke Bracey | |
| J U N E | 3 | Fire Island | Hulu / Searchlight Pictures | Andrew Ahn (director); Joel Kim Booster (screenplay); Joel Kim Booster, Bowen Yang, Conrad Ricamora, James Scully, Margaret Cho | |
| J U N E | 3 | Watcher | IFC Midnight / Shudder / AGC Studios | Chloe Okuno (director/screenplay); Maika Monroe, Karl Glusman, Burn Gorman | |
| J U N E | 3 | Dashcam | Momentum Pictures / Blumhouse Productions | Rob Savage (director/screenplay); Gemma Hurley, Jed Shepherd (screenplay); Annie Hardy, Amer Chadha-Patel, Angela Enahoro | |
| J U N E | 3 | White Elephant | RLJE Films / AMC+ | Jesse V. Johnson (director/screenplay); Erik Martinez (screenplay); Michael Rooker, Bruce Willis, Olga Kurylenko, John Malkovich | |
| J U N E | 7 | Hustle | Netflix / Madison 23 Productions / Roth/Kirschenbaum Films | Jeremiah Zagar (director); Taylor Materne, Will Fetters (screenplay); Adam Sandler, Queen Latifah, Juancho Hernangómez, Ben Foster, Kenny Smith, Anthony Edwards, Robert Duvall | |
| J U N E | 10 | Jurassic World Dominion | Universal Pictures / Amblin Entertainment / Perfect World Pictures | Colin Trevorrow (director/screenplay); Emily Carmichael (screenplay); Chris Pratt, Bryce Dallas Howard, Laura Dern, Jeff Goldblum, Sam Neill, DeWanda Wise, Mamoudou Athie, BD Wong, Omar Sy | |
| J U N E | 14 | Jennifer Lopez: Halftime | Netflix | Amanda Micheli (director); Jennifer Lopez | |
| J U N E | 14 | Terror on the Prairie | The Daily Wire | Michael Polish (director); Josiah Nelson (screenplay); Gina Carano, Donald Cerrone, Tyler Fischer, Gabriel-Kane Day-Lewis, Rhys Jackson Becker, Matthias Hues, Samaire Armstrong, Heath Freeman, Nick Searcy | |
| J U N E | 15 | Father of the Bride | HBO Max / Warner Bros. Pictures / Plan B Entertainment | Gaz Alazraki (director); Matt Lopez (screenplay); Andy García, Gloria Estefan, Adria Arjona, Isabela Merced, Diego Boneta, Chloe Fineman | |
| J U N E | 16 | Mad God | IFC Midnight / Shudder | Phil Tippett (director/screenplay); Alex Cox | |
| J U N E | 17 | Lightyear | Walt Disney Pictures / Pixar Animation Studios | Angus MacLane (director/screenplay); Jason Headley (screenplay); Chris Evans, Keke Palmer, Peter Sohn, Taika Waititi, Dale Soules, James Brolin, Uzo Aduba | |
| J U N E | 17 | Spiderhead | Netflix / The New Yorker Studios | Joseph Kosinski (director); Rhett Reese, Paul Wernick (screenplay); Chris Hemsworth, Miles Teller, Jurnee Smollett | |
| J U N E | 17 | Jerry & Marge Go Large | Paramount+ / Paramount Players / MRC | David Frankel (director); Brad Copeland (screenplay); Bryan Cranston, Annette Bening | |
| J U N E | 17 | Cha Cha Real Smooth | Apple TV+ / Endeavor Content | Cooper Raiff (director/screenplay); Dakota Johnson, Cooper Raiff, Raúl Castillo, Odeya Rush, Evan Assante, Vanessa Burghardt, Brad Garrett, Leslie Mann | |
| J U N E | 17 | Mid-Century | Lionsgate | Sonja O'Hara (director); Mike Stern (screenplay); Stephen Lang, Shane West, Bruce Dern | |
| J U N E | 17 | Abandoned | Vertical Entertainment | Spencer Squire (director); Erik Patterson, Jessica Scott (screenplay); Emma Roberts, John Gallagher Jr., Michael Shannon | |
| J U N E | 21 | Beavis and Butt-Head Do the Universe | Paramount+ / MTV Entertainment Studios / Titmouse, Inc. | John Rice, Albert Calleros (directors); Mike Judge, Lew Morton, Guy Maxtone-Graham, Ian Maxtone-Graham (screenplay); Mike Judge, Gary Cole, Nat Faxon, Chi McBride, Andrea Savage | |
| J U N E | 24 | Elvis | Warner Bros. Pictures | Baz Luhrmann (director/screenplay); Sam Bromell, Craig Pearce, Jeremy Doner (screenplay); Austin Butler, Tom Hanks, Olivia DeJonge, Helen Thomson, Richard Roxburgh | |
| J U N E | 24 | The Black Phone | Universal Pictures / Blumhouse Productions | Scott Derrickson (director/screenplay); C. Robert Cargill (screenplay); Ethan Hawke, Mason Thames, Madeleine McGraw | |
| J U N E | 24 | The Man from Toronto | Netflix / Sony Pictures / Bron Creative / Escape Artists | Patrick Hughes (director); Robbie Fox, Chris Bremmer (screenplay); Kevin Hart, Woody Harrelson, Kaley Cuoco, Jasmine Mathews, Lela Loren, Pierson Fodé, Jencarlos Canela, Ellen Barkin | |
| J U N E | 24 | The Sea Beast | Netflix / Netflix Animation | Chris Williams (director/screenplay); Nell Benjamin (screenplay); Karl Urban, Zaris-Angel Hator, Jared Harris, Marianne Jean-Baptiste | |
| J U N E | 24 | Marcel the Shell with Shoes On | A24 / Cinereach | Dean Fleischer Camp (director/screenplay); Jenny Slate, Nick Paley (screenplay); Jenny Slate, Rosa Salazar, Thomas Mann, Dean Fleischer Camp, Lesley Stahl, Jesse Cilio, Isabella Rossellini | |
| J U N E | 24 | Rise | Disney+ / Walt Disney Pictures | Akin Omotoso (director); Arash Amel (screenplay); Uche Agada, Ral Agada, Jaden Osimuwa, Elijah Shomanke, Yetide Badaki, Dayo Okeniyi | |
| J U N E | 24 | Press Play | The Avenue / CJ Entertainment | Greg Björkman (director/screenplay); James Bachelor (screenplay); Clara Rugaard, Lewis Pullman, Lyrica Okano, Christina Chang, Matt Walsh, Danny Glover | |
| J U N E | 28 | Beauty | Netflix | Andrew Dosunmu (director); Lena Waithe (screenplay); Gracie Marie Bradley, Niecy Nash, Aleyse Shannon, Giancarlo Esposito, Kyle Bary, Micheal Ward, Sharon Stone, Andre Ozim | |

== July–September ==
| Opening | | Title | Production company | Cast and crew | Ref. |
|---|---|---|---|---|---|
| J U L Y | 1 | Minions: The Rise of Gru | Universal Pictures / Illumination | Kyle Balda (director); Matthew Fogel (screenplay); Steve Carell, Pierre Coffin, Taraji P. Henson, Lucy Lawless, Dolph Lundgren, Danny Trejo, Jean-Claude Van Damme, Julie Andrews, Alan Arkin, Michelle Yeoh | |
| J U L Y | 1 | The Forgiven | Roadside Attractions / Vertical Entertainment / Brookstreet Pictures / Film4 | John Michael McDonagh (director/screenplay); Ralph Fiennes, Jessica Chastain, Matt Smith, Ismael Kanater, Caleb Landry Jones, Abbey Lee, Mourad Zaoui, Marie-Josée Croze, Alex Jennings, Saïd Taghmaoui, Christopher Abbott | |
| J U L Y | 1 | Mr. Malcolm's List | Bleecker Street / Ingenious Media / Refinery29 | Emma Holly Jones (director); Suzanne Allain (screenplay); Freida Pinto, Sope Dirisu, Oliver Jackson-Cohen, Ashley Park, Zawe Ashton, Theo James | |
| J U L Y | 1 | The Princess | Hulu / 20th Century Studios / Original Film | Le-Van Kiet (director); Ben Lustig, Jake Thornton (screenplay); Joey King, Dominic Cooper, Olga Kurylenko, Ngô Thanh Vân | |
| J U L Y | 1 | Hot Seat | Lionsgate | James Cullen Bressack (director); Collin Watts, Leon Langford (screenplay); Kevin Dillon, Mel Gibson | |
| J U L Y | 5 | Hello, Goodbye, and Everything in Between | Netflix / Lionsgate | Michael Lewen (director); Amy Reed, Ben York Jones (screenplay); Jordan Fisher, Talia Ryder Ayo Edebiri, Nico Hiraga | |
| J U L Y | 8 | Thor: Love and Thunder | Marvel Studios | Taika Waititi (director/screenplay); Jennifer Kaytin Robinson (screenplay); Chris Hemsworth, Christian Bale, Tessa Thompson, Jaimie Alexander, Taika Waititi, Russell Crowe, Natalie Portman | |
| J U L Y | 12 | South Park: The Streaming Wars Part 2 | Paramount+ / Comedy Central | Trey Parker (director/screenplay); Trey Parker, Matt Stone, April Stewart, Kimberly Brooks, Adrien Beard, Neyla Cantu, Betty Boogie Parker | |
| J U L Y | 15 | The Gray Man | Netflix / AGBO / Roth/Kirschenbaum Films | Russo brothers (directors): Joe Russo, Christopher Markus, Stephen McFeely (screenplay); Ryan Gosling, Chris Evans, Ana de Armas, Jessica Henwick, Regé-Jean Page, Wagner Moura, Julia Butters, Dhanush, Alfre Woodard, Billy Bob Thornton | |
| J U L Y | 15 | Where the Crawdads Sing | Columbia Pictures / 3000 Pictures / Hello Sunshine | Olivia Newman (director); Lucy Alibar (screenplay); Daisy Edgar-Jones, Taylor John Smith, Harris Dickinson, Michael Hyatt, Sterling Macer, Jr., Jojo Regina, Garret Dillahunt, Ahna O'Reilly, David Strathairn | |
| J U L Y | 15 | Paws of Fury: The Legend of Hank | Paramount Pictures / Nickelodeon Movies / Aniventure / Cinesite | Rob Minkoff, Mark Koetsier, Chris Bailey (directors); Ed Stone, Nate Hopper, Mel Brooks, Norman Steinberg, Andrew Bergman, Richard Pryor, Alan Uger (screenplay); Michael Cera, Ricky Gervais, Mel Brooks, George Takei, Aasif Mandvi, Gabriel Iglesias, Djimon Hounsou, Michelle Yeoh, Samuel L. Jackson | |
| J U L Y | 15 | Persuasion | Netflix / MRC | Carrie Cracknell (director); Ronald Bass, Alice Victoria Winslow (screenplay); Dakota Johnson, Cosmo Jarvis, Nikki Amuka-Bird, Mia McKenna-Bruce, Richard E. Grant, Henry Golding | |
| J U L Y | 15 | Gone in the Night | Vertical Entertainment | Eli Horowitz (director/screenplay); Matthew Derby (screenplay); Winona Ryder, Dermot Mulroney, John Gallagher Jr., Owen Teague, Brianne Tju | |
| J U L Y | 15 | 1Up | Amazon Studios / Lionsgate / BuzzFeed Studios | Kyle Newman (director); Julia Yorks (screenplay); Paris Berelc, Taylor Zakhar Perez, Hari Nef, Ruby Rose | |
| J U L Y | 15 | Wrong Place | Vertical Entertainment | Mike Burns (director); Bill Lawrence (screenplay); Ashley Greene, Bruce Willis | |
| J U L Y | 15 | Don't Make Me Go | Amazon Studios / Big Beach | Hannah Marks (director); Vera Herbert (screenplay); John Cho, Mia Isaac | |
| J U L Y | 19 | He's Watching | XYZ Films | Jacob Aaron Estes (director/screenplay); Iris Serena Estes, Lucas Steel Estes | |
| J U L Y | 22 | Nope | Universal Pictures / Monkeypaw Productions | Jordan Peele (director/screenplay); Daniel Kaluuya, Keke Palmer, Steven Yeun, Michael Wincott, Brandon Perea, Keith David | |
| J U L Y | 22 | Anything's Possible | Amazon Studios / Orion Pictures / Killer Films | Billy Porter (director); Ximena García Lecuona (screenplay); Eva Reign, Abubakr Ali, Renée Elise Goldsberry | |
| J U L Y | 22 | Alone Together | Vertical Entertainment | Katie Holmes (director/screenplay); Katie Holmes, Jim Sturgess, Derek Luke, Melissa Leo, Zosia Mamet, Becky Ann Baker | |
| J U L Y | 29 | DC League of Super-Pets | Warner Bros. Pictures / Warner Animation Group / DC Films / Seven Bucks Productions | Jared Stern (director/screenplay); John Whittington (screenplay); Dwayne Johnson, Kevin Hart, Kate McKinnon, John Krasinski, Vanessa Bayer, Natasha Lyonne, Diego Luna, Thomas Middleditch, Ben Schwartz, Keanu Reeves | |
| J U L Y | 29 | Thirteen Lives | Amazon Studios / Metro-Goldwyn-Mayer / Bron Creative / Imagine Entertainment | Ron Howard (director); William Nicholson (screenplay); Viggo Mortensen, Colin Farrell, Joel Edgerton, Tom Bateman | |
| J U L Y | 29 | Vengeance | Focus Features / Blumhouse Productions | B. J. Novak (director/screenplay); B. J. Novak, Boyd Holbrook, J. Smith-Cameron, Lio Tipton, Dove Cameron, Issa Rae, Ashton Kutcher | |
| J U L Y | 29 | Sharp Stick | Utopia / FilmNation Entertainment | Lena Dunham (director/screenplay); Kristine Froseth, Jon Bernthal, Luka Sabbat, Scott Speedman, Lena Dunham, Ebon Moss-Bachrach, Taylour Paige, Jennifer Jason Leigh | |
| J U L Y | 29 | Not Okay | Hulu / Searchlight Pictures | Quinn Shephard (director/screenplay); Zoey Deutch, Mia Isaac, Nadia Alexander, Embeth Davidtz, Karan Soni, Dylan O'Brien | |
| J U L Y | 29 | Paradise Highway | Lionsgate | Anna Gutto (director/screenplay); Juliette Binoche, Frank Grillo, Hala Finley, Cameron Monaghan, Veronica Ferres, Christiane Seidel, Morgan Freeman | |
| J U L Y | 29 | Resurrection | IFC Films / Shudder | Andrew Semans (director/screenplay); Rebecca Hall, Grace Kaufman, Michael Esper, Tim Roth | |
| J U L Y | 29 | A Love Song | Bleecker Street / Stage 6 Films | Max Walker-Silverman (director/screenplay); Dale Dickey, Wes Studi | |
| J U L Y | 29 | Honor Society | Paramount+ / Awesomeness Films | Oran Zegman (director); David A. Goodman (screenplay); Angourie Rice, Gaten Matarazzo, Christopher Mintz-Plasse | |
| A U G U S T | 2 | Allegoria | Shudder / RLJE Films | Spider One (director/screenplay); Krsy Fox, John Ennis, Bryce Johnson, Edward Hong, Adam Busch, Adam Marcinowski | |
| A U G U S T | 2 | Kung Fu Ghost | Nameless Productions / Vision Films | Jennifer N. Linch (director); Ivan White (screenplay); Jennifer N. Linch, Noah Sargent, Mark Atkinson, Amber Grayson, David S. Dawson, Whitney Wegman-Wood | |
| A U G U S T | 5 | Bullet Train | Columbia Pictures / 87North Productions | David Leitch (director); Zak Olkewicz (screenplay); Brad Pitt, Joey King, Aaron Taylor-Johnson, Brian Tyree Henry, Andrew Koji, Hiroyuki Sanada, Michael Shannon, Bad Bunny, Sandra Bullock | |
| A U G U S T | 5 | Easter Sunday | Universal Pictures / DreamWorks Pictures / Rideback | Jay Chandrasekhar (director); Ken Cheng, Kate Angelo (screenplay); Jo Koy, Eugene Cordero, Tia Carrere, Asif Ali, Lou Diamond Phillips | |
| A U G U S T | 5 | Rise of the Teenage Mutant Ninja Turtles: The Movie | Netflix / Netflix Animation / Nickelodeon Movies | Andy Suriano, Ant Ward (directors); Tony Gama-Lobo, Rebecca May (screenplay); Ben Schwartz, Omar Benson Miller, Brandon Mychal Smith, Josh Brener, Haley Joel Osment, Kat Graham, Eric Bauza | |
| A U G U S T | 5 | Luck | Apple TV+ / Skydance Animation | Peggy Holmes (director); Kiel Murray (screenplay); Eva Noblezada, Simon Pegg, Jane Fonda, Whoopi Goldberg, Flula Borg, Lil Rel Howery, Colin O'Donoghue, John Ratzenberger | |
| A U G U S T | 5 | Prey | Hulu / 20th Century Studios / Davis Entertainment | Dan Trachtenberg (director); Patrick Aison (screenplay); Amber Midthunder, Dakota Beavers, Dane DiLiegro, Michelle Thrush, Stormee Kipp, Julian Black Antelope, Bennett Taylor | |
| A U G U S T | 5 | They/Them | Peacock / Blumhouse Productions | John Logan (director/screenplay); Theo Germaine, Carrie Preston, Anna Chlumsky, Austin Crute, Quei Tann, Anna Lore, Cooper Koch, Monique Kim, Darwin del Fabro, Hayley Griffith, Boone Platt, Mark Ashworth, Kevin Bacon | |
| A U G U S T | 5 | Bodies Bodies Bodies | A24 | Halina Reijn (director); Sarah DeLappe (screenplay); Amandla Stenberg, Maria Bakalova, Myha'la Herrold, Chase Sui Wonders, Rachel Sennott, Lee Pace, Pete Davidson | |
| A U G U S T | 12 | Secret Headquarters | Paramount+ / Paramount Pictures / Jerry Bruckheimer Films | Henry Joost, Ariel Schulman (directors/screenplay); Christopher Yost, Josh Koenigsberg (screenplay); Owen Wilson, Walker Scobell, Jesse Williams, Keith L. Williams, Momona Tamada, Charles Melton, Michael Peña | |
| A U G U S T | 12 | Day Shift | Netflix / 87North Productions | J. J. Perry (director); Tyler Tice, Shay Hatten (screenplay); Jamie Foxx, Dave Franco, Natasha Liu Bordizzo, Meagan Good, Karla Souza, Steve Howey, Scott Adkins | |
| A U G U S T | 12 | Mack & Rita | Gravitas Premiere / Page Fifty-Four Pictures | Katie Aselton (director); Paul Welsh, Madeline Walter (screenplay); Diane Keaton, Taylour Paige, Elizabeth Lail, Loretta Devine, Amy Hill, Lois Smith, Wendie Malick, Simon Rex, Martin Short, Dustin Milligan | |
| A U G U S T | 12 | Fall | Lionsgate | Scott Mann (director/screenplay); Jonathan Frank (screenplay); Grace Caroline Currey, Virginia Gardner, Mason Gooding, Jeffrey Dean Morgan | |
| A U G U S T | 12 | Emily the Criminal | Roadside Attractions / Vertical Entertainment | John Patton Ford (director/screenplay); Aubrey Plaza, Theo Rossi, Megalyn Echikunwoke, Gina Gershon | |
| A U G U S T | 12 | Summering | Bleecker Street | James Ponsoldt (director/screenplay); Benjamin Percy (screenplay); Lia Barnett, Lake Bell, Sarah Cooper, Ashley Madekwe, Madalen Mills, Megan Mullaly, Eden Grace Redfield, Sanai Victoria | |
| A U G U S T | 12 | Look Both Ways | Netflix | Wanuri Kahiu (director); April Prosser (screenplay); Lili Reinhart, Danny Ramirez, David Corenswet, Aisha Dee, Andrea Savage, Luke Wilson, Nia Long | |
| A U G U S T | 19 | Beast | Universal Pictures / Will Packer Productions / RVK Studios | Baltasar Kormákur (director); Ryan Engle (screenplay); Idris Elba, Sharlto Copley, Iyana Halley, Leah Jeffries | |
| A U G U S T | 19 | Orphan: First Kill | Paramount Pictures / Paramount Players / Entertainment One / Paramount+ | William Brent Bell (director); David Coggeshall (screenplay); Isabelle Fuhrman, Rossif Sutherland, Hiro Kanagawa, Matthew Finlan, Julia Stiles | |
| A U G U S T | 19 | Spin Me Round | IFC Films / AMC+ | Jeff Baena (director/screenplay); Alison Brie (screenplay); Alison Brie, Alessandro Nivola, Molly Shannon, Lil Rel Howery, Aubrey Plaza | |
| A U G U S T | 19 | Delia's Gone | Vertical Entertainment | Robert Budreau (director/screenplay); Stephan James, Marisa Tomei, Paul Walter Hauser, Travis Fimmel | |
| A U G U S T | 26 | Three Thousand Years of Longing | Metro-Goldwyn-Mayer / FilmNation Entertainment / Kennedy Miller Mitchell | George Miller (director/screenplay); Augusta Gore (screenplay); Idris Elba, Tilda Swinton | |
| A U G U S T | 26 | Samaritan | Amazon Studios / Metro-Goldwyn-Mayer / Balboa Productions | Julius Avery (director); Bragi F. Schut (screenplay); Sylvester Stallone, Javon Walton, Pilou Asbæk, Dascha Polanco, Moisés Arias | |
| A U G U S T | 26 | Me Time | Netflix | John Hamburg (director/screenplay); Kevin Hart, Mark Wahlberg, Luis Gerardo Méndez, Regina Hall, Jimmy O. Yang | |
| A U G U S T | 26 | The Invitation | Screen Gems | Jessica M. Thompson (director); Blair Butler (screenplay); Nathalie Emmanuel, Thomas Doherty, Stephanie Corneliussen, Alana Boden, Hugh Skinner, Sean Pertwee | |
| A U G U S T | 26 | Breaking | Bleecker Street | Abi Damaris Corbin (director/screenplay); Kwame Kwei-Armah (screenplay); John Boyega, Nicole Beharie, Selenis Leyva, Connie Britton, Jeffrey Donovan, Michael K. Williams | |
| A U G U S T | 26 | Funny Pages | A24 | Owen Kline (director/screenplay); Daniel Zolghadri, Matthew Maher, Miles Emanuel, Maria Dizzia, Josh Pais | |
| S E P T E M B E R | 2 | Honk for Jesus. Save Your Soul. | Focus Features / Monkeypaw Productions / Peacock | Adamma Ebo (director/screenplay); Regina Hall, Sterling K. Brown, Austin Crute, Nicole Beharie | |
| S E P T E M B E R | 2 | Gigi & Nate | Roadside Attractions | Nick Hamm (director); David Hudgins (screenplay); Marcia Gay Harden, Charlie Rowe, Josephine Langford, Zoe Colletti, Hannah Alligood, Jim Belushi, Diane Ladd | |
| S E P T E M B E R | 2 | Wire Room | Lionsgate / Emmett/Furla Oasis | Matt Eskandari (director); Brandon Stiefer (screenplay); Kevin Dillon, Bruce Willis | |
| S E P T E M B E R | 2 | One Way | Saban Films | Andrew Baird (director); Ben Conway (screenplay); Machine Gun Kelly, Kevin Bacon, Travis Fimmel | |
| S E P T E M B E R | 4 | After Ever Happy | Voltage Pictures | Castille Landon (director); Sharon Soboli (screenplay); Josephine Langford, Hero Fiennes Tiffin, Louise Lombard, Rob Estes, Arielle Kebbel, Chance Perdomo, Frances Turner, Kiana Madeira, Carter Jenkins, Stephen Moyer, Mira Sorvino | |
| S E P T E M B E R | 7 | My Son Hunter | Breitbart News | Robert Davi (director); Brian Godawa, Phelim McAleer (screenplay); Laurence Fox, Gina Carano, John James | |
| S E P T E M B E R | 8 | Pinocchio | Disney+ / Walt Disney Pictures / ImageMovers | Robert Zemeckis (director/screenplay); Chris Weitz (screenplay); Tom Hanks, Benjamin Evan Ainsworth, Joseph Gordon-Levitt, Keegan-Michael Key, Lorraine Bracco, Cynthia Erivo, Luke Evans | |
| S E P T E M B E R | 9 | Barbarian | 20th Century Studios / Regency Enterprises | Zach Cregger (director/screenplay); Georgina Campbell, Bill Skarsgård, Justin Long | |
| S E P T E M B E R | 9 | End of the Road | Netflix / Flavor Unit Entertainment / Twisted Pictures | Millicent Shelton (director); Christopher J. Moore, David Loughery (screenplay); Queen Latifah, Ludacris, Mychala Lee, Shaun Dixon, Beau Bridges | |
| S E P T E M B E R | 9 | Lifemark | Fathom Events / Kendrick Brothers | Kevin Peeples (director/screenplay); Stephen Kendrick, Alex Kendrick (screenplay); Kirk Cameron, Alex Kendrick, Rebecca Rogers Nelson, Dawn Long, Justin Sterner, Marisa Hampton, Raphael Ruggero | |
| S E P T E M B E R | 13 | Clerks III | Lionsgate / View Askew Productions / SModcast Pictures | Kevin Smith (director/screenplay); Brian O'Halloran, Jeff Anderson, Trevor Fehrman, Austin Zajur, Jason Mewes, Rosario Dawson, Kevin Smith | |
| S E P T E M B E R | 16 | The Woman King | TriStar Pictures / Entertainment One | Gina Prince-Bythewood (director); Dana Stevens (screenplay); Viola Davis, Thuso Mbedu, Lashana Lynch, Sheila Atim, Hero Fiennes Tiffin, John Boyega | |
| S E P T E M B E R | 16 | See How They Run | Searchlight Pictures | Tom George (director); Mark Chappell (screenplay); Sam Rockwell, Saoirse Ronan, Adrien Brody, Ruth Wilson, Reece Shearsmith, Harris Dickinson, David Oyelowo | |
| S E P T E M B E R | 16 | Blonde | Netflix / Plan B Entertainment | Andrew Dominik (director/screenplay); Ana de Armas, Adrien Brody, Bobby Cannavale, Xavier Samuel, Julianne Nicholson | |
| S E P T E M B E R | 16 | Pearl | A24 | Ti West (director/screenplay); Mia Goth (screenplay); Mia Goth, David Corenswet, Tandi Wright, Matthew Sutherland, Emma Jenkins-Purro, Alistair Sewell | |
| S E P T E M B E R | 16 | Do Revenge | Netflix | Jennifer Kaytin Robinson (director/screenplay); Celeste Ballard (screenplay); Camila Mendes, Maya Hawke, Austin Abrams, Sophie Turner, Sarah Michelle Gellar | |
| S E P T E M B E R | 16 | The Silent Twins | Focus Features / Canal+ | Agnieszka Smoczyńska (director); Andrea Seigel (screenplay); Letitia Wright, Tamara Lawrance, Nadine Marshall, Treva Etienne, Michael Smiley, Jodhi May | |
| S E P T E M B E R | 16 | Confess, Fletch | Paramount Global Content Distribution / Miramax | Greg Mottola (director/screenplay); Zev Borow (screenplay); Jon Hamm, Marcia Gay Harden, Kyle MacLachlan, Roy Wood Jr., John Slattery | |
| S E P T E M B E R | 16 | Moonage Daydream | Neon / BMG / HBO Documentary Films | Brett Morgen (director/screenplay); David Bowie | |
| S E P T E M B E R | 16 | God's Country | IFC Films / The Film Arcade | Julian Higgins (director/screenplay); Shaye Ogbonna (screenplay); Thandiwe Newton, Jeremy Bobb, Joris Jarsky, Jefferson White, Kai Lennox, Tanaya Beatty | |
| S E P T E M B E R | 16 | Goodnight Mommy | Amazon Studios | Matt Sobel (director); Kyle Warren (screenplay); Naomi Watts, Cameron Crovetti, Nicholas Crovetti, Peter Hermann, Crystal Lucas-Perry, Jeremy Bobb | |
| S E P T E M B E R | 16 | Miracle Valley | Mubi | Greg Sestero (director/screenplay); Angela Mariano, Rick Edwards, Greg Sestero, Louisa Torres, Jesse Brenneman, Kristen StephensonPino | |
| S E P T E M B E R | 16 | Running the Bases | UP2U Media | Marty Roberts, Jimmy Womble (directors/screenplay); Brett Varvel, Gigi Orsillo, Todd Terry, Cameron Arnett | |
| S E P T E M B E R | 20 | Jeepers Creepers: Reborn | Screen Media Films | Timo Vuorensola (director); Jake Seal, Sean Michael Argo (screenplay); Sydney Craven, Imran Adams, Dee Wallace, Gary Graham | |
| S E P T E M B E R | 23 | Don't Worry Darling | Warner Bros. Pictures / New Line Cinema / Vertigo Entertainment | Olivia Wilde (director); Katie Silberman (screenplay); Florence Pugh, Harry Styles, Olivia Wilde, Gemma Chan, KiKi Layne, Nick Kroll, Chris Pine | |
| S E P T E M B E R | 23 | Catherine Called Birdy | Amazon Studios / Working Title Films | Lena Dunham (director/screenplay); Bella Ramsey, Billie Piper, Andrew Scott | |
| S E P T E M B E R | 23 | Section Eight | RLJE Films / AMC+ / Firebrand | Christian Sesma (director); Chad Law, Josh Ridgway (screenplay); Ryan Kwanten, Dolph Lundgren, Dermot Mulroney, Scott Adkins, Mickey Rourke | |
| S E P T E M B E R | 23 | Lou | Netflix / Bad Robot | Anna Foerster (director); Maggie Cohn, Jack Stanley (screenplay); Allison Janney, Jurnee Smollett, Logan Marshall-Green, Ridley Asha Bateman, Matt Craven | |
| S E P T E M B E R | 23 | On the Come Up | Paramount+ / Paramount Players | Sanaa Lathan (director); Kay Oyegun (screenplay); Jamila C. Gray, Da'Vine Joy Randolph, Mike Epps, Lil Yachty, Sanaa Lathan, Method Man, Vin Hill | |
| S E P T E M B E R | 23 | A Jazzman's Blues | Netflix / Tyler Perry Studios | Tyler Perry (director/screenplay); Joshua Boone, Amirah Vann, Solea Pfeiffer, Austin Scott, Ryan Eggold | |
| S E P T E M B E R | 23 | 5-25-77 | MVD Entertainment Group | Patrick Read Johnson (director/screenplay); John Francis Daley, Austin Pendleton, Colleen Camp, Neil Flynn, Justin Mentell | |
| S E P T E M B E R | 27 | The Munsters | Universal Pictures Home Entertainment / Netflix | Rob Zombie (director/screenplay); Sheri Moon Zombie, Jeff Daniel Phillips, Daniel Roebuck, Richard Brake, Jorge Garcia, Sylvester McCoy, Catherine Schell, Cassandra Peterson | |
| S E P T E M B E R | 30 | Smile | Paramount Pictures / Paramount Players / Temple Hill Entertainment | Parker Finn (director/screenplay); Sosie Bacon, Jessie T. Usher, Kyle Gallner, Kal Penn, Rob Morgan | |
| S E P T E M B E R | 30 | Bros | Universal Pictures / Apatow Productions | Nicholas Stoller (director/screenplay); Billy Eichner (screenplay); Billy Eichner, Luke Macfarlane | |
| S E P T E M B E R | 30 | Hocus Pocus 2 | Disney+ / Walt Disney Pictures | Anne Fletcher (director); Jen D'Angelo (screenplay); Bette Midler, Sarah Jessica Parker, Kathy Najimy, Sam Richardson, Doug Jones, Whitney Peak, Belissa Escobedo, Tony Hale, Hannah Waddingham | |
| S E P T E M B E R | 30 | The Greatest Beer Run Ever | Apple TV+ / Skydance Media | Peter Farrelly (director/screenplay); Brian Currie, Pete Jones (screenplay); Zac Efron, Russell Crowe | |
| S E P T E M B E R | 30 | The Good House | Lionsgate / Roadside Attractions / DreamWorks Pictures / Participant | Maya Forbes, Wallace Wolodarsky (directors/screenplay); Thomas Bezucha (screenplay); Sigourney Weaver, Kevin Kline, Morena Baccarin, Rob Delaney | |
| S E P T E M B E R | 30 | Luckiest Girl Alive | Netflix / Made Up Stories | Mike Barker (director); Jessica Knoll (screenplay); Mila Kunis | |
| S E P T E M B E R | 30 | Dead for a Dollar | Quiver Distribution / Myriad Pictures | Walter Hill (director/screenplay); Christoph Waltz, Willem Dafoe, Rachel Brosnahan, Warren Burke, Benjamin Bratt | |
| S E P T E M B E R | 30 | My Best Friend's Exorcism | Amazon Studios / Endeavor Content | Damon Thomas (director); Jenna Lamia (screenplay); Elsie Fisher, Amiah Miller, Rachel Ogechi Kanu, Cathy Ang, Clayton Royal Johnson, Nathan Anderson, Cynthia Evans, Chris Lowell | |

== October–December ==
| Opening | | Title | Production company | Cast and crew | Ref. |
|---|---|---|---|---|---|
| O C T O B E R | 5 | Mr. Harrigan's Phone | Netflix / Blumhouse Productions | John Lee Hancock (director/screenplay); Donald Sutherland, Jaeden Martell, Joe Tippett, Kirby Howell-Baptiste | |
| O C T O B E R | 6 | Terrifier 2 | Bloody Disgusting / Fuzz on the Lens Productions / Dark Age Cinema | Damien Leone (director/screenplay); Lauren LaVera, Elliot Fullam, Sarah Voigt, Kailey Hyman, Casey Harnett, David Howard Thornton | |
| O C T O B E R | 7 | Lyle, Lyle, Crocodile | Columbia Pictures | Will Speck, Josh Gordon (directors); William Davies (screenplay); Javier Bardem, Constance Wu, Winslow Fegley, Scoot McNairy, Brett Gelman, Ego Nwodim, Shawn Mendes | |
| O C T O B E R | 7 | Amsterdam | 20th Century Studios / Regency Enterprises | David O. Russell (director/screenplay); Christian Bale, Margot Robbie, John David Washington, Chris Rock, Anya Taylor-Joy, Zoe Saldaña, Mike Myers, Michael Shannon, Timothy Olyphant, Andrea Riseborough, Taylor Swift, Matthias Schoenaerts, Alessandro Nivola, Rami Malek, Robert De Niro | |
| O C T O B E R | 7 | Tár | Focus Features | Todd Field (director/screenplay); Cate Blanchett, Noémie Merlant, Nina Hoss, Sophie Kauer, Julian Glover, Allan Corduner, Mark Strong | |
| O C T O B E R | 7 | Hellraiser | Hulu / Spyglass Media Group | David Bruckner (director); Ben Collins, Luke Piotrowski (screenplay); Odessa A'zion, Jamie Clayton, Adam Faison, Drew Starkey, Brandon Flynn, Aoife Hinds, Jason Liles, Yinka Olorunnife, Selina Lo, Zachary Hing, Kit Clarke, Goran Višnjić, Hiam Abbass | |
| O C T O B E R | 7 | Significant Other | Paramount+ / Paramount Players | Dan Berk, Robert Olsen (directors/screenplay); Maika Monroe, Jake Lacy, Matthew Yang King | |
| O C T O B E R | 10 | Grimcutty | Hulu | John Ross (director/screenplay); Sara Wolfkind, Shannyn Sossamon, Usman Ally, Callan Farris, Brenda Schmid, Joel Ezra Hebner, Kayden Alexander Koshelev, Tate Moore | |
| O C T O B E R | 14 | Halloween Ends | Universal Pictures / Miramax / Blumhouse Productions / Peacock | David Gordon Green (director/screenplay); Paul Brad Logan, Chris Bernier, Danny McBride (screenplay); Jamie Lee Curtis, Andi Matichak, Rohan Campbell, Will Patton, Kyle Richards, James Jude Courtney | |
| O C T O B E R | 14 | Till | Orion Pictures / Eon Productions | Chinonye Chukwu (director/screenplay); Michael Reilly, Keith Beauchamp (screenplay); Danielle Deadwyler, Jalyn Hall, Frankie Faison, Haley Bennett, Whoopi Goldberg | |
| O C T O B E R | 14 | Rosaline | Hulu / 20th Century Studios / 21 Laps Entertainment | Karen Maine (director); Scott Neustadter, Michael H. Weber (screenplay); Kaitlyn Dever, Isabela Merced, Kyle Allen, Sean Teale, Christopher McDonald, Minnie Driver, Bradley Whitford | |
| O C T O B E R | 14 | Raymond & Ray | Apple TV+ / Apple Studios | Rodrigo García (director/screenplay); Ewan McGregor, Ethan Hawke, Maribel Verdú, Sophie Okonedo | |
| O C T O B E R | 14 | The Curse of Bridge Hollow | Netflix | Jeff Wadlow (director); Todd Berger, Robert Rugan (screenplay); Marlon Wayans, Priah Ferguson, Kelly Rowland, John Michael Higgins, Lauren Lapkus, Rob Riggle, Nia Vardalos | |
| O C T O B E R | 14 | Bitch Ass | Quiver Distribution | Bill Posley (director/screenplay); Jonathan Colomb (screenplay); Tony Todd | |
| O C T O B E R | 16 | The School for Good and Evil | Netflix / Roth/Kirschenbaum Films | Paul Feig (director/screenplay); David Magee (screenplay); Sophia Anne Caruso, Sofia Wylie, Laurence Fishburne, Michelle Yeoh, Jamie Flatters, Kit Young, Peter Serafinowicz, Rob Delaney, Mark Heap, Patti LuPone, Rachel Bloom, Cate Blanchett, Kerry Washington, Charlize Theron | |
| O C T O B E R | 16 | The Good Nurse | Netflix / Protozoa Pictures / FilmNation Entertainment | Tobias Lindholm (director); Krysty Wilson-Cairns (screenplay); Jessica Chastain, Eddie Redmayne, Nnamdi Asomugha, Kim Dickens, Noah Emmerich | |
| O C T O B E R | 18 | V/H/S/99 | Shudder / Bloody Disgusting | Maggie Levin, Johannes Roberts, Flying Lotus, Tyler MacIntyre, Vanessa & Joseph Winter (directors) | |
| O C T O B E R | 21 | Black Adam | Warner Bros. Pictures / New Line Cinema / DC Films / FlynnPictureCo. / Seven Bucks Productions | Jaume Collet-Serra (director); Adam Sztykiel, Rory Haines, Sohrab Noshirvani (screenplay); Dwayne Johnson, Aldis Hodge, Noah Centineo, Sarah Shahi, Marwan Kenzari, Quintessa Swindell, Pierce Brosnan | |
| O C T O B E R | 21 | Ticket to Paradise | Universal Pictures / Working Title Films | Ol Parker (director); Daniel Pipski (screenplay); George Clooney, Julia Roberts, Kaitlyn Dever, Maxime Bouttier, Billie Lourd, Lucas Bravo | |
| O C T O B E R | 21 | Wendell & Wild | Netflix / Netflix Animation / Gotham Group / Monkeypaw Productions | Henry Selick (director/screenplay); Jordan Peele (screenplay); Keegan-Michael Key, Jordan Peele, Angela Bassett, Lyric Ross, Ving Rhames, James Hong | |
| O C T O B E R | 21 | The Banshees of Inisherin | Searchlight Pictures / Blueprint Pictures / Film4 | Martin McDonagh (director/screenplay); Colin Farrell, Brendan Gleeson, Kerry Condon, Barry Keoghan | |
| O C T O B E R | 21 | My Policeman | Amazon Studios / Berlanti-Schechter Films | Michael Grandage (director); Ron Nyswaner (screenplay); Harry Styles, Emma Corrin, Gina McKee, Linus Roache, David Dawson, Rupert Everett | |
| O C T O B E R | 21 | Aftersun | A24 / BBC Film / British Film Institute | Charlotte Wells (director/screenplay); Paul Mescal, Frankie Corio, Celia Rowlson-Hall | |
| O C T O B E R | 21 | Detective Knight: Rogue | Lionsgate | Edward John Drake (director/screenplay); Bruce Willis, Lochlyn Munro, Jimmy Jean-Louis | |
| O C T O B E R | 21 | The Return of Tanya Tucker: Featuring Brandi Carlile | Sony Pictures Classics | Kathlyn Horan (director) | |
| O C T O B E R | 28 | Armageddon Time | Focus Features | James Gray (director/screenplay); Anne Hathaway, Jeremy Strong, Banks Repeta, Jaylin Webb, Anthony Hopkins | |
| O C T O B E R | 28 | Call Jane | Roadside Attractions / Ingenious Media | Phyllis Nagy (director); Hayley Schore, Roshan Sethi (screenplay); Elizabeth Banks, Sigourney Weaver, Chris Messina, Kate Mara, Wunmi Mosaku, Cory Michael Smith, Grace Edwards, John Magaro | |
| O C T O B E R | 28 | Causeway | Apple TV+ / A24 / IAC Films / Excellent Cadaver | Lila Neugebauer (director); Ottessa Moshfegh, Luke Goebel, Elizabeth Sanders (screenplay); Jennifer Lawrence, Brian Tyree Henry, Linda Emond, Jayne Houdyshell, Stephen McKinley Henderson, Russell Harvard | |
| O C T O B E R | 28 | Prey for the Devil | Lionsgate / Gold Circle Films | Daniel Stamm (director); Robert Zappia (screenplay); Jacqueline Byers, Colin Salmon, Christian Navarro, Lisa Palfrey, Nicholas Ralph, Ben Cross, Virginia Madsen | |
| O C T O B E R | 28 | Run Sweetheart Run | Amazon Studios / Blumhouse Productions | Shana Feste (director/screenplay); Keith Josef Adkins, Kellee Terrell (screenplay); Ella Balinska, Pilou Asbæk, Dayo Okeniyi, Betsy Brandt, Ava Grey, Lamar Johnson, Jess Gabor, Clark Gregg, Shohreh Aghdashloo | |
| N O V E M B E R | 2 | The Wonder | Netflix / Element Pictures / Screen Ireland | Sebastián Lelio (director/screenplay); Emma Donoghue, Alice Birch (screenplay); Florence Pugh, Tom Burke, Niamh Algar, Elaine Cassidy, Dermot Crowley, Brían F. O'Byrne, David Wilmot, Ruth Bradley, Caolán Byrne, Josie Walker, Ciarán Hinds, Toby Jones, Kíla Lord Cassidy | |
| N O V E M B E R | 2 | The Independent | Peacock / Relativity Media / Anonymous Content | Amy Rice (director); Evan Parter (screenplay); Jodie Turner-Smith, John Cena, Brian Cox, Luke Kirby, Stephen Lang, Ann Dowd | |
| N O V E M B E R | 4 | Enola Holmes 2 | Netflix / Legendary Pictures | Harry Bradbeer (director); Jack Thorne (screenplay); Millie Bobby Brown, Henry Cavill, Helena Bonham Carter | |
| N O V E M B E R | 4 | My Father's Dragon | Netflix / Netflix Animation / Cartoon Saloon | Nora Twomey (director); Meg LeFauve (screenplay); Jacob Tremblay, Gaten Matarazzo, Golshifteh Farahani, Dianne Wiest, Rita Moreno, Chris O'Dowd, Judy Greer, Alan Cumming, Yara Shahidi, Jackie Earle Haley, Whoopi Goldberg, Ian McShane | |
| N O V E M B E R | 4 | Weird: The Al Yankovic Story | The Roku Channel / Funny or Die | Eric Appel (director/screenplay); "Weird Al" Yankovic (screenplay); Daniel Radcliffe, Evan Rachel Wood, Rainn Wilson, Toby Huss, Julianne Nicholson | |
| N O V E M B E R | 4 | The Estate | Signature Entertainment | Dean Craig (director/screenplay); Toni Collette, Anna Faris, David Duchovny, Rosemarie DeWitt, Ron Livingston, Kathleen Turner | |
| N O V E M B E R | 4 | The Minute You Wake Up Dead | Grindstone Entertainment | Michael Mailer (director/screenplay); Timothy Holland (screenplay); Cole Hauser, Morgan Freeman, Jaimie Alexander | |
| N O V E M B E R | 4 | Dear Zoe | Freestyle Digital Media | Gren Wells (director); Marc Lhormer, Melissa Martin (screenplay); Sadie Sink, Theo Rossi, Kweku Collins, Jessica Capshaw, Justin Bartha, Vivien Lyra Blair | |
| N O V E M B E R | 4 | Something in the Dirt | XYZ Films | Justin Benson (director/screenplay); Aaron Moorhead (director); Justin Benson, Aaron Moorhead | |
| N O V E M B E R | 6 | Aqua Teen Forever: Plantasm | Warner Bros. Home Entertainment / Williams Street / Bento Box Entertainment | Matt Maiellaro, Dave Willis (directors/screenplay); Dana Snyder, Carey Means, Dave Willis, Matt Maiellaro, Peter Serafinowicz, Paul Walter Hauser | |
| N O V E M B E R | 9 | Guillermo del Toro's Pinocchio | Netflix / Netflix Animation / The Jim Henson Company / ShadowMachine | Guillermo del Toro (director/screenplay); Mark Gustafson (director); Patrick McHale (screenplay); Ewan McGregor, David Bradley, Gregory Mann, Burn Gorman, Ron Perlman, John Turturro, Finn Wolfhard, Cate Blanchett, Tim Blake Nelson, Christoph Waltz, Tilda Swinton | |
| N O V E M B E R | 9 | Falling for Christmas | Netflix | Janeen Damian (director/screenplay); Jeff Bonnett, Ron Oliver (screenplay); Lindsay Lohan | |
| N O V E M B E R | 11 | Black Panther: Wakanda Forever | Marvel Studios | Ryan Coogler (director/screenplay); Joe Robert Cole (screenplay); Letitia Wright, Lupita Nyong'o, Danai Gurira, Winston Duke, Florence Kasumba, Dominique Thorne, Michaela Coel, Mabel Cadena, Tenoch Huerta Mejía, Martin Freeman, Julia Louis-Dreyfus, Angela Bassett | |
| N O V E M B E R | 11 | The Fabelmans | Universal Pictures / Amblin Entertainment / Reliance Entertainment | Steven Spielberg (director/screenplay); Tony Kushner (screenplay); Michelle Williams, Paul Dano, Seth Rogen, Gabriel LaBelle, Judd Hirsch | |
| N O V E M B E R | 11 | Spirited | Apple TV+ / Gloria Sanchez Productions / Maximum Effort | Sean Anders (director/screenplay); John Morris (screenplay); Will Ferrell, Ryan Reynolds, Octavia Spencer, Sunita Mani, Patrick Page, Marlow Barkley, Tracy Morgan | |
| N O V E M B E R | 11 | Is That Black Enough for You?!? | Netflix | Elvis Mitchell (director/screenplay); Margaret Avery, Harry Belafonte, Charles Burnett | |
| N O V E M B E R | 11 | Paradise City | Saban Films | Chuck Russell (director/screenplay); Corey Large, Edward John Drake (screenplay); John Travolta, Bruce Willis | |
| N O V E M B E R | 15 | Poker Face | Screen Media | Russell Crowe (director/screenplay); Russell Crowe, Liam Hemsworth, RZA, Aden Young, Steve Bastoni, Daniel MacPherson | |
| N O V E M B E R | 16 | A Christmas Story Christmas | HBO Max / Warner Bros. Pictures / Legendary Pictures | Clay Kaytis (director); Nick Schenk (screenplay); Peter Billingsley, Erinn Hayes, Scott Schwartz, R. D. Robb, Zack Ward, Julie Hagerty | |
| N O V E M B E R | 18 | She Said | Universal Pictures / Annapurna Pictures / Plan B Entertainment | Maria Schrader (director); Rebecca Lenkiewicz (screenplay); Carey Mulligan, Zoe Kazan, Patricia Clarkson, Andre Braugher, Jennifer Ehle, Samantha Morton, Ashley Judd | |
| N O V E M B E R | 18 | The Menu | Searchlight Pictures / Hyperobject Industries / Gary Sanchez Productions | Mark Mylod (director); Seth Reiss, Will Tracy (screenplay); Ralph Fiennes, Anya Taylor-Joy, Nicholas Hoult, Hong Chau, Janet McTeer, Reed Birney, Judith Light, John Leguizamo | |
| N O V E M B E R | 18 | Disenchanted | Disney+ / Walt Disney Pictures | Adam Shankman (director); Brigitte Hales (screenplay); Amy Adams, Patrick Dempsey, Maya Rudolph, Yvette Nicole Brown, Jayma Mays, Gabriella Baldacchino, Idina Menzel, James Marsden | |
| N O V E M B E R | 18 | Slumberland | Netflix / Chernin Entertainment | Francis Lawrence (director); David Guion, Michael Handelman (screenplay); Jason Momoa, Marlow Barkley, Chris O'Dowd, Kyle Chandler, Weruche Opia | |
| N O V E M B E R | 18 | Bones and All | Metro-Goldwyn-Mayer / The Apartment Pictures | Luca Guadagnino (director); David Kajganich (screenplay); Taylor Russell, Timothée Chalamet, Michael Stuhlbarg, André Holland, Chloë Sevigny, David Gordon Green, Jessica Harper, Jake Horowitz, Mark Rylance | |
| N O V E M B E R | 18 | The Inspection | A24 / Gamechanger Films | Elegance Bratton (director/screenplay); Jeremy Pope, Raúl Castillo, McCaul Lombardi, Aaron Dominguez, Nicholas Logan, Eman Esfandi, Andrew Kai, Aubrey Joseph, Bokeem Woodbine, Gabrielle Union | |
| N O V E M B E R | 18 | Scrooge: A Christmas Carol | Netflix / Netflix Animation | Stephen Donnelly (director/screenplay); Leslie Bricusse (screenplay); Luke Evans, Olivia Colman, Jessie Buckley, Jonathan Pryce, Johnny Flynn, James Cosmo, Trevor Dion Nicholas | |
| N O V E M B E R | 18 | Lamborghini: The Man Behind the Legend | Lionsgate | Robert Moresco (director/screenplay); Frank Grillo, Romano Reggiani, Matteo Leoni, Hannah van der Westhuysen, Giovanni Antonacci, Mira Sorvino, Gabriel Byrne | |
| N O V E M B E R | 18 | The People We Hate at the Wedding | Amazon Studios / FilmNation Entertainment | Claire Scanlon (director); Lizzie Molyneux-Logelin, Wendy Molyneux (screenplay); Allison Janney, Ben Platt, Cynthia Addai-Robinson, Kristen Bell | |
| N O V E M B E R | 23 | Strange World | Walt Disney Pictures / Walt Disney Animation Studios | Don Hall (director); Qui Nguyen (screenplay); Jake Gyllenhaal, Dennis Quaid, Jaboukie Young-White, Gabrielle Union, Lucy Liu | |
| N O V E M B E R | 23 | Glass Onion: A Knives Out Mystery | Netflix / T-Street | Rian Johnson (director/screenplay); Daniel Craig, Edward Norton, Janelle Monáe, Kathryn Hahn, Leslie Odom Jr., Jessica Henwick, Madelyn Cline, Kate Hudson, Dave Bautista | |
| N O V E M B E R | 23 | Devotion | Columbia Pictures / Stage 6 Films / Black Label Media | J. D. Dillard (director); Jake Crane, Jonathan A. Stewart (screenplay); Jonathan Majors, Glen Powell, Christina Jackson, Daren Kagasoff, Joe Jonas, Spencer Neville, Nick Hargrove, Thomas Sadoski | |
| N O V E M B E R | 23 | Nanny | Amazon Studios / Blumhouse Productions / Topic Studios | Nikyatu Jusu (director/screenplay); Anna Diop, Michelle Monaghan, Sinqua Walls, Morgan Spector, Rose Decker, Leslie Uggams | |
| N O V E M B E R | 24 | The Noel Diary | Netflix | Charles Shyer (director/screenplay); Rebecca Connor, David Golden (screenplay); Justin Hartley, Barrett Doss, Essence Atkins, Bonnie Bedelia, James Remar | |
| N O V E M B E R | 25 | White Noise | Netflix / A24 / Heyday Films | Noah Baumbach (director/screenplay); Adam Driver, Greta Gerwig, Don Cheadle | |
| D E C E M B E R | 2 | Violent Night | Universal Pictures / 87North Productions | Tommy Wirkola (director); Pat Casey, Josh Miller (screenplay); David Harbour, John Leguizamo, Alex Hassell, Alexis Louder, Beverly D'Angelo | |
| D E C E M B E R | 2 | Emancipation | Apple TV+ / Apple Studios / Westbrook Studios / Escape Artists | Antoine Fuqua (director); William N. Collage (screenplay); Will Smith, Ben Foster, Charmaine Bingwa | |
| D E C E M B E R | 2 | Spoiler Alert | Focus Features | Michael Showalter (director); David Marshall Grant, Dan Savage (screenplay); Jim Parsons, Ben Aldridge, Sally Field | |
| D E C E M B E R | 2 | Diary of a Wimpy Kid: Rodrick Rules | Disney+ / Walt Disney Pictures / Bardel Entertainment | Luke Cormican (director); Jeff Kinney (screenplay); Hunter Dillon, Brady Noon, Ethan William Childress, Chris Diamantopoulos, Erica Cerra | |
| D E C E M B E R | 2 | Darby and the Dead | Hulu / 20th Century Studios | Silas Howard (director); Wenonah Wilms, Becca Greene (screenplay); Riele Downs, Auliʻi Cravalho, Chosen Jacobs, Asher Angel, Wayne Knight, Derek Luke, Tony Danza | |
| D E C E M B E R | 2 | Lady Chatterley's Lover | Netflix / Blueprint Pictures | Laure de Clermont-Tonnerre (director); David Magee (screenplay); Emma Corrin, Jack O'Connell, Matthew Duckett, Ella Hunt, Faye Marsay, Joely Richardson | |
| D E C E M B E R | 2 | The Eternal Daughter | A24 / BBC Film / Element Pictures | Joanna Hogg (director/screenplay); Tilda Swinton, Joseph Mydell, Carly-Sophia Davies | |
| D E C E M B E R | 2 | Almighty Zeus | TriCoast Worldwide | Chris Soriano (director/screenplay); Chris Soriano, Michael D'Aguilar, Peter Laboy, Ari Huber, Kimberly Ransom, Miguel Matos, Tenzin Dhondup, Aryana Hamzehloo | |
| D E C E M B E R | 4 | Why the Nativity? | Turning Point Television | Paul Joiner (director/screenplay); David Jeremiah, Rose Anaya, Logan Polson, Henry Mark, Martin Chan, Peter D. Michael, Paul L. Davis, Quinn Rystad, Todd Blakesley, Simone Attenni, Jordan Jacobo | |
| D E C E M B E R | 9 | Roald Dahl's Matilda the Musical | Netflix / TriStar Pictures / Working Title Films | Matthew Warchus (director); Dennis Kelly (screenplay); Alisha Weir, Lashana Lynch, Stephen Graham, Andrea Riseborough, Emma Thompson | |
| D E C E M B E R | 9 | Empire of Light | Searchlight Pictures / Neal Street Productions | Sam Mendes (director/screenplay); Olivia Colman, Micheal Ward, Monica Dolan, Tom Brooke, Tanya Moodie, Hannah Onslow, Crystal Clarke, Toby Jones, Colin Firth | |
| D E C E M B E R | 9 | Night at the Museum: Kahmunrah Rises Again | Disney+ / Walt Disney Pictures / 21 Laps Entertainment | Matt Danner (director); Ray DeLaurentis, William Schifrin (screenplay); Joshua Bassett, Jamie Demetriou, Alice Isaaz, Gillian Jacobs, Joseph Kamal, Thomas Lennon, Zachary Levi, Alexander Salamat, Kieran Sequoia, Jack Whitehall, Bowen Yang, Steve Zahn | |
| D E C E M B E R | 9 | The Whale | A24 / Protozoa Pictures | Darren Aronofsky (director); Samuel D. Hunter (screenplay); Brendan Fraser, Sadie Sink, Hong Chau, Ty Simpkins, Samantha Morton | |
| D E C E M B E R | 9 | Something from Tiffany's | Amazon Studios / Hello Sunshine | Daryl Wein (director); Tamara Chestna (screenplay); Zoey Deutch, Kendrick Sampson, Ray Nicholson, Shay Mitchell | |
| D E C E M B E R | 9 | Detective Knight: Redemption | Lionsgate | Edward John Drake (director/screenplay); Paul Johansson, Bruce Willis | |
| D E C E M B E R | 9 | The Mean One | Sleight of Hand Productions / Kali Pictures | Steven LaMorte (director); Flip Kobler, Finn Kobler (screenplay); David Howard Thornton, Krystle Martin, Chase Mullins, John Bigham, Erik Baker, Flip Kobler, Amy Schumacher | |
| D E C E M B E R | 16 | Avatar: The Way of Water | 20th Century Studios / Lightstorm Entertainment | James Cameron (director/screenplay); Rick Jaffa, Amanda Silver (screenplay); Sam Worthington, Zoe Saldaña, Sigourney Weaver, Stephen Lang, Kate Winslet | |
| D E C E M B E R | 21 | Puss in Boots: The Last Wish | Universal Pictures / DreamWorks Animation | Joel Crawford (director); Paul Fisher, Tommy Swerdlow (screenplay); Antonio Banderas, Salma Hayek, Harvey Guillén, Florence Pugh, Olivia Colman, Ray Winstone, Samson Kayo, John Mulaney, Wagner Moura, Da'Vine Joy Randolph, Anthony Mendez | |
| D E C E M B E R | 23 | Babylon | Paramount Pictures | Damien Chazelle (director/screenplay); Brad Pitt, Margot Robbie, Diego Calva, Jean Smart, Jovan Adepo, Li Jun Li, P. J. Byrne, Lukas Haas, Olivia Hamilton, Max Minghella, Rory Scovel, Katherine Waterston, Tobey Maguire | |
| D E C E M B E R | 23 | Whitney Houston: I Wanna Dance with Somebody | TriStar Pictures / Black Label Media | Kasi Lemmons (director); Anthony McCarten (screenplay); Naomi Ackie, Stanley Tucci, Ashton Sanders, Tamara Tunie, Nafessa Williams, Clarke Peters | |
| D E C E M B E R | 23 | The Pale Blue Eye | Netflix / Cross Creek Pictures | Scott Cooper (director/screenplay); Christian Bale, Harry Melling, Gillian Anderson, Lucy Boynton, Robert Duvall | |
| D E C E M B E R | 23 | Women Talking | Orion Pictures / Plan B Entertainment | Sarah Polley (director/screenplay); Rooney Mara, Claire Foy, Jessie Buckley, Judith Ivey, Ben Whishaw, Frances McDormand | |
| D E C E M B E R | 29 | A Man Called Otto | Columbia Pictures / Stage 6 Films / Playtone / SF Studios | Marc Forster (director), David Magee (screenplay); Tom Hanks, Mariana Treviño, Rachel Keller, Manuel Garcia-Rulfo, Truman Hanks, Mike Birbiglia | |
| D E C E M B E R | 30 | Alice, Darling | Lionsgate / Elevation Pictures | Mary Nighy (director); Alanna Francis (screenplay); Anna Kendrick, Kaniehtiio Horn, Charlie Carrick, Wunmi Mosaku | |

== See also ==
- List of 2022 box office number-one films in the United States
- 2022 in the United States
