= Sarah Cooper: Everything's Fine =

American comedy special

- Created by: Sarah Cooper; Natasha Lyonne; Maya Rudolph
- Written by: Sarah Cooper; Natasha Lyonne; Maya Rudolph; Paula Pell; Cole Escola; Jake Fogelnest
- Directed by: Natasha Lyonne
- Starring: Sarah Cooper
- Country of origin: United States

Production
- Executive producers: Alex Bach; Danielle Renfrew Behrens; Chris Burns; Natasha Lyonne; Alex Parks; Daniel Powell; Maya Rudolph
- Cinematography: Polly Morgan
- Running time: 49 minutes

Original release
- Network: Netflix
- Release: October 27, 2020

Sarah Cooper: Everything's Fine is an American comedy special starring comedian Sarah Cooper with a series of sketch comedies featuring guest appearances from various celebrities. Netflix released the special on October 27, 2020. The special was created by Cooper, Maya Rudolph, and Natasha Lyonne, and was directed by Lyonne.

== Synopsis ==
Sarah Cooper portrays a fictionalized version of herself, hosting the morning show Everything's Fine. Fred Armisen plays "Scooter", Cooper's producer, who wears strange outfits meant to serve as personal protective equipment. Maya Rudolph plays the meteorologist.

Cooper conducts interviews of Megan Thee Stallion, who portrays herself, and Ben Stiller, who portrays "8008s", a robot who is the chief executive officer of a tech company. Jon Hamm portrays a satirized version of Mike Lindell, the Trump-supporting founder of My Pillow. Aubrey Plaza plays a host of a QVC-like home shopping network that is part of the QAnon conspiracy theory. Jane Lynch plays a baker who is a guest on the show, who turns out to be a "Karen", calling the police on Cooper. Whoopi Goldberg provides narration for a pseudodocumentary on the history of "Karens".

The special also has Cooper lip synching public statements made by Donald Trump, Ivanka Trump, Melania Trump, and Kellyanne Conway. They also recreate the Donald Trump Access Hollywood tape, with Cooper lip synching Trump, Helen Mirren playing the role of Billy Bush, and Jonathan Van Ness portraying Arianne Zucker. Others who appeared in the special include Connie Chung, Winona Ryder, Marisa Tomei, Danielle Brooks, Tommy Davidson, Jordan Black, Marcella Arguello, and Eddie Pepitone. Tom Kane provided narration for the special.

== Background ==
Prior to the COVID-19 pandemic, Cooper was a stand-up comedian who hosted and performed at open mic nights. When the pandemic required comedy clubs to close, she began making videos and posting them to TikTok, hoping they would become viral. After President Trump began hosting briefings on the pandemic, Cooper started making videos in which she lip synched Trump's words. Cooper went viral with the video titled "How to Medical", a 50-second video in which she lip synched Trump's suggestion of injecting ultraviolet light or disinfectants to fight COVID-19 infection during a coronavirus task force meeting, on April 23, 2020. She signed with William Morris Endeavor in June.

== Development ==
In June 2020, Cooper began speaking with Rudolph and Natasha Lyonne, who founded a production company, Animal Pictures, with Danielle Renfrew Behrens. They developed a comedy special, which became the first project to be greenlit by Animal Pictures. Cooper had the idea of basing the special on a morning show where the host "ends up under the desk" having a mental breakdown due to being overwhelmed by the negativity in the news. She cited Mr. Show with Bob and David as an influence, as she wanted the segments to relate to each other. Lyonne likened the "societal paranoia" conveyed by the special to Network and A Face in the Crowd.

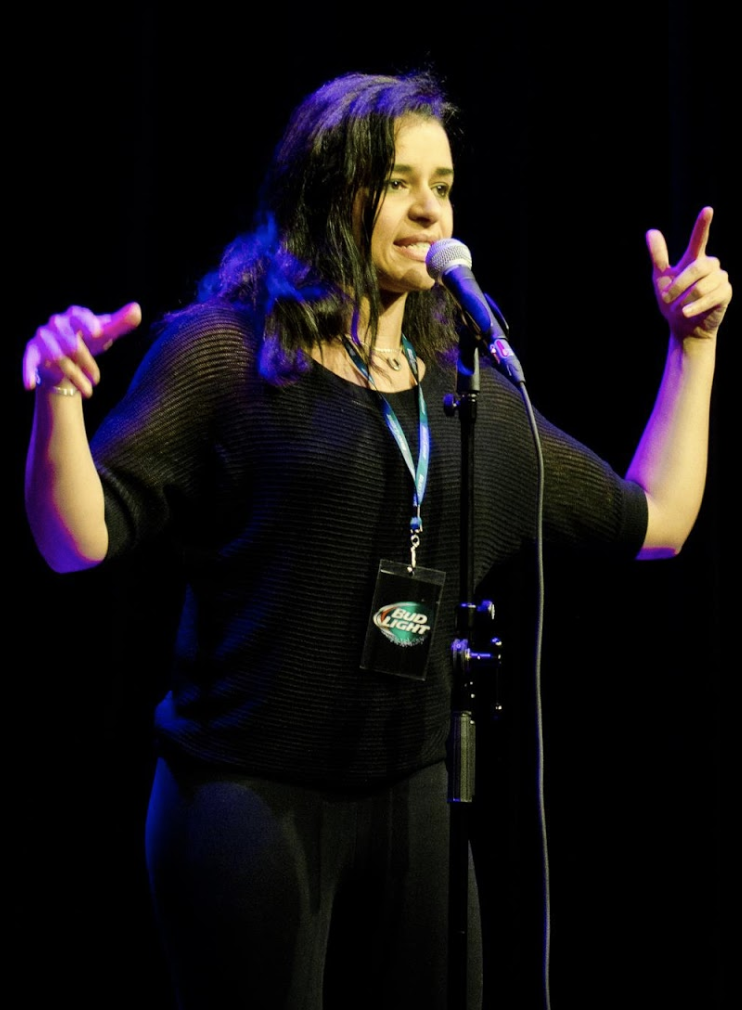
Sarah Cooper performing stand-up comedy

Netflix picked up the special in August, with Lyonne set to direct, and Cooper and Paula Pell serving as executive producers. The special was written by Cooper, Pell, Lyonne, Rudolph, Cole Escola, and Jake Fogelnest. Polly Morgan served as the cinematographer. They had no budget for music, so Rudolph and Armisen created their own music. Production was a rush because of their desire to release the special before the 2020 United States presidential election, which was to take place on November 3.

It took two months from the initial meeting between Cooper, Lyonne, and Rudolph, to the beginning of filming. The special was filmed in five days in Los Angeles. Filming included COVID-19 safety protocols, including daily COVID-19 testing, wearing masks, and 15 minute ventilation breaks for every two hours on set. Though the ventilation breaks were supposed to be taken outdoors, some of them had to be taken indoors due to the poor air quality resulting from the August 2020 California lightning wildfires. The special has a run time of 49 minutes, and was released on October 27.

== Reception ==
The New York Times called Sarah Cooper: Everything's Fine "a celebrity-rich, intermittently funny sketch show that hangs on a narrative of apocalyptic doom." Variety wrote that it was a "non-stop parade of celebrity cameos and leftover Saturday Night Live sketches that often feel too long."

The film review website Metacritic gave an aggregate score of 71 out of 100, which indicates "generally favorable reviews". Rotten Tomatoes gave the film a score of 63% with the consensus, "Sarah Cooper's comedic charisma is as charming on screen as it was on social media, but a lack of thematic cohesion and an uneven ratio of successful skits make her first special merely Fine."

The Associated Press named Cooper one of its Breakout Performers of 2020.
