= The Tiger Rising (film) =

2022 American drama film by Ray Giarratana

- Theatrical release poster
- Directed by: Ray Giarratana
- Written by: Ray Giarratana
- Based on: The Tiger Rising by Kate DiCamillo
- Produced by: Deborah Giarratana; Ryan Smith
- Starring: Christian Convery; Madalen Mills; Katharine McPhee; Sam Trammell; Dennis Quaid; Queen Latifah; Ahmad Harhash
- Cinematography: Shane Kelly
- Edited by: Christopher Gay
- Music by: Don L. Harper; Tommy Emmanuel
- Production companies: Highland Film Group; GG Filmz; Thomasville Pictures; Bay Point Media; Streamline Global Group
- Distributed by: The Avenue
- Release date: January 21, 2022
- Running time: 102 minutes
- Country: United States
- Language: English
- Budget: $10 million
- Box office: $1.1 million

The Tiger Rising is a 2022 American drama film written and directed by Ray Giarratana and starring Christian Convery, Madalen Mills, Katharine McPhee, Sam Trammell, Dennis Quaid and Queen Latifah. It is based on the 2001 book of the same name by Kate DiCamillo.

== Plot ==
Quiet, twelve-year-old Rob Horton suffers from a strange, itchy rash on his legs that he knows is not contagious. He lives with his father in a Florida motel called the Kentucky Star. His father Robert, and Rob have recently moved to Lister, Florida, after the death of Rob's mother Caroline, to cancer six months prior.

Early one morning, before the school bus's arrival, Rob is walking in the woods and finds a caged tiger. Surprised, he hurries back to the motel to grab his bag to catch the school bus. On it, two bullies relently badger Rob. Directly after he gets on, a girl named Sistine Bailey (named after the Sistine Chapel) does as well, as she has recently moved nearby.

Rob has a flashback of him and his mother. She is showing him an art book, explaining the background behind Michaelangelo's Sistine Chapel's ceiling and the painting technique.

Beuchhamo, Robert's and the cleaner Willy May's boss at the motel, is openly critical of both. He is not especially friendly to his motel guests either.

Sistine introduces herself to the class, who laugh at her name, unfamiliar with the famous Roman masterpiece. Angry, the Philadelphian insists she will not stay long in the ignorant South, as she assures them her father will save her shortly.

Rob has another flashback to Caroline. Although the cancer had started to take its toll, she taught him how to carve wood. This becomes Rob's other artistic talent, besides drawing.

At school, the principal calls Rob into his office. As some families have contacted him, fearing the boy's unusual skin condition on his legs might be contagious, he requests he stay out of school until it clears.

Rob sits outside of the school, waiting until the bus arrives, when recess starts. Two big girls start harassing Sistine, who fights back. When Rob speaks up in her defense, they go after him, but he runs.

On the bus later, Sistine inadvertently sits next to Rob. Soon she is ranting again about the ignorance of the people in the town, especially in reference to the origins of her name. Rob quietly demonstrates he knows, giving details of the fresco painted there. Sistine offers to bring him his homework assignments so he does not fall behind.

Robert tells Rob he had already explained his skin condition to the principal. Confirming the boy is willing to stay out of school for a few days, he gives him chores around the motel. Rob befriends the chambermaid Willie May, who suggests his skin condition might be caused by sadness.

When Sistine gets back from school, Rob shows her the tiger. He usually keeps his feelings locked away in an imaginary suitcase, but he begins to involuntarily open up emotionally to her. The bossy Sistine insists they let the caged tiger go, but Rob is wary of how Beachamp would react if he does.

Beachamp hires Rob to feed the tiger twice a day, as it intimidates him, so gives him the keys to the cage. Robert finds the meat, which has started to rot, but he does not explain it is for the tiger.

After showing Willie May the tiger, she tells Rob letting it free is not an option. However, he finally relents to Sistine and releases the tiger into the woods. However, just moments later, they hear a shot. Robert, who had been grappling with the armed Beauchamp, inadvertantlt shoots the tiger dead with the other's gun.

Rob then angrily attacks his father, telling him he wishes his father died instead of his mother. He also forces him to say his mother's name Caroline Horton, which he had forbidden him to say. After complying, they hug, Rob cries and the rash seems to have gone.

Sistine's anger also dissipates, she accepts her father is not coming for her, and her living here. In a voiceover, an adult Sistine says the lesson to be learned is some things are not meant to be locked up, but freed.

== Cast ==
- Christian Convery as Rob Horton
- Dennis Quaid as Beauchamp
- Queen Latifah as Willie May
- Madalen Mills as Sistine Bailey
- Katharine McPhee as Caroline Horton
- Sam Trammell as Rob Horton Sr.
- Nicholas Ryan Hernandez as Billy Threemonger
- Jayden Fontaine as Norton Threemonger
- Angela Giarratana as Miss Mills

== Production ==
Principal photography occurred in Tifton, Georgia and Thomasville, Georgia in November 2019. Filming wrapped in December 2019.

=== Crew payment controversy ===
On November 18, 2021, The Hollywood Reporter published an article about Ryan Donnell Smith, Allen Cheney, Emily Hunter Salveson and Ryan Winterstern not paying crew members before or after filming the movie.

== Release ==
The film was released in theaters on January 21, 2022 and on Demand and Digital February 8, 2022.

=== Box office ===
In South Africa, the film earned $16,541 from 59 theaters in its opening weekend. In the United States and Canada, the film earned $364,216 from 872 theaters in its first weekend, and $214,980 in its second.

=== Reception ===
The film has a 17% approval rating on Rotten Tomatoes based on 18 reviews, with an average rating of 4.2/10. On Metacritic — which assigns a weighted mean score — the film has a score of 33 out of 100 based on 6 critics, indicating "generally unfavorable reviews".

Nick Schager of Variety gave the film a negative review and wrote, "The fact that writer-director Ray Giarratana's film is based on Kate DiCamillo's children's book — and thus intended for young audiences — is hardly an excuse for such stodgy storytelling, which plays out with no mystery, ambiguity or subtlety."

Nadir Samara of Screen Rant awarded the film one star out of five and wrote, "The Tiger Rising is too serious & abstract for kids yet too ham-fisted for adults. Sadly, the tale has none of the imagination its protagonist does."
