= Sarah Cooper =

Jamaican-American comedian and author (born 1977)

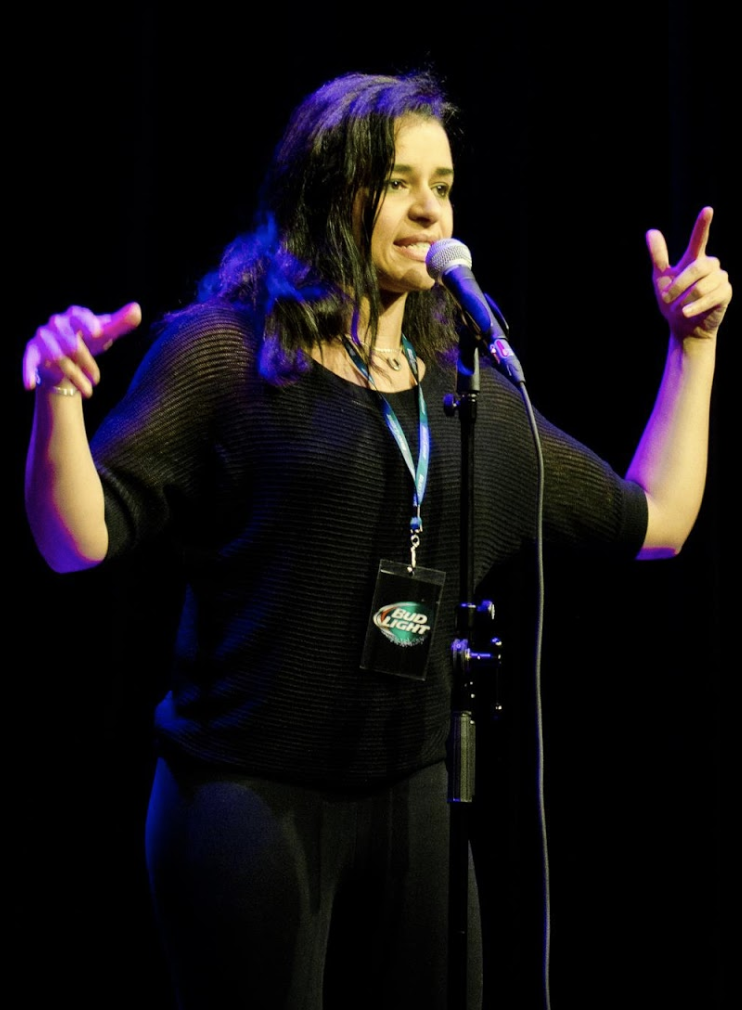
- Cooper in 2013
- Born: Sarah Anne Cooper; December 19, 1977 (age 48); Jamaica
- Education: University of Maryland, College Park; Georgia Institute of Technology
- Occupations: Author, comedian
- Years active: 2014–present

YouTube information
- Channels: Sarah Cooper; The Cooper Review
- Years active: 2006–present (SC); 2014–present (TCR)
- Genres: Comedy; commentary
- Subscribers: 345,000 (SC); 7,650 (TCR)
- Views: 47.41 million(SC); 649,503 (TCR)
- Last updated: October 19, 2025
- Website: sarahcpr.com

Sarah Anne Cooper (born December 19, 1977) is a Jamaican-American author, YouTuber and comedian. Her first two books, 100 Tricks to Appear Smart in Meetings and Draw What Success Looks Like were published in 2016, with her third book, How to Be Successful Without Hurting Men's Feelings, being published in 2018.

During the COVID-19 pandemic, Cooper began uploading videos of herself lip-syncing statements made by Donald Trump. The success of these led to appearances on several talk shows, and in October 2020 her show Sarah Cooper: Everything's Fine premiered on Netflix.

== Early life and education ==
Cooper was born in Jamaica in 1977. One of her grandmothers was Chinese-Jamaican. Her family moved to Rockville, Maryland, in 1980. Her father worked as an electrical engineer for the Washington Metropolitan Area Transit Authority in nearby Washington, and her mother in the human resources department of a consulting company. Cooper was already interested in show business as a teenager and originally intended to study theater; however, following the wishes of her parents, she first pursued studies outside show business and earned degrees in economics from the University of Maryland, College Park, and in digital design from the Georgia Institute of Technology.

== Career ==
=== Early career ===
Cooper began performing stand-up comedy in Atlanta while she was working as a visual designer at Yahoo! Later, while she was a user experience designer for Google Docs, Sheets, and Slides, she continued to write and perform stand-up and met her former husband, Jeff Palm, who was an engineer on Google Docs. She has said that she would analyze Stephen Colbert's monologues from The Colbert Report to understand what made them humorous. In 2006, Cooper created and starred in a short-lived YouTube web series, The Bubble, which lasted only three four-minute episodes. In 2014, she wrote a blog post called "10 Tricks to Appear Smart in Meetings" that went viral with five million views. Later that year, she left Google to pursue writing and comedy full time.

Her first book, 100 Tricks to Appear Smart in Meetings, a satirical version of a self-help book, was published on October 4, 2016. Her "colouring and activity book", Draw What Success Looks Like, was published in the same month. Her third book, How to Be Successful Without Hurting Men's Feelings, was published on October 30, 2018. It is subtitled "Non-threatening Leadership Strategies for Women", and contains satirical advice for women such as "Pepper your emails with exclamation marks and emojis.... Your lack of efficient communication will make you seem more approachable." Her books were not commercially successful. At the end of 2019, five years after she had resigned from Google, Cooper was considering quitting her comedy career due to lack of success.

=== Satirical videos ===
In spring 2020, Cooper began publishing a series of videos on TikTok in which she lip-synced comments by Donald Trump on the topic of potential cures for the 2019 coronavirus. Her first viral satire, titled "How to Medical", features her lip-syncing a minute of audio from the April 23 press briefing during which Trump suggested that shining light into the body and injecting disinfectant would be an effective method for treating the coronavirus. She subsequently produced several other viral videos based on the same premise. By late October 2020, "How to Medical" had received over 24 million views across Twitter and TikTok. Cooper also redistributed her "How to Bible" TikTok video using her Instagram, Twitter, and YouTube accounts, achieving a combined total of 16 million views by the end of 2020.

In an interview with The Atlantic, Cooper said that she enjoyed performing on TikTok and that she might continue on the platform following the COVID-19 pandemic lockdowns rather than perform stand-up in front of a live audience. The Boston Globe remarked that Cooper's videos are also noted as being examples of extremely economical political satire since they are structured around an unedited voice clip of a politician speaking. This extremely minimalistic comedic approach, which includes neither a script nor an audience, was described as an innovative response to the limitations that comedians faced during COVID-19 lockdowns. Cooper analyzed the videos by commenting that "I had taken away the suit and the podium and the people behind him smiling and nodding and calling him "sir," and all that was left were his empty words, which, in reality, were not the best. It felt like the antidote to the gaslighting." Cooper lip-synced Trump talking about mail-in ballots, for a video played during the 2020 Democratic National Convention.

She was named Digital Creator of the Year by Adweek, and was nominated in the "Creator of the Year" and "Comedy" categories for the 10th Streamy Awards.

=== Television ===
In the wake of the popularity of her TikTok videos, Cooper was invited to appear on The Last Word with Lawrence O'Donnell and The Ellen DeGeneres Show. She has also appeared on The Tonight Show Starring Jimmy Fallon, and The Late Show with Stephen Colbert, and as a guest host on Jimmy Kimmel Live! She played Inigo Montoya in Home Movie: The Princess Bride, a fan film recreation of The Princess Bride, which premiered on Quibi in June 2020.

In October 2020, the Netflix special Sarah Cooper: Everything's Fine was released, produced by Maya Rudolph and directed by Natasha Lyonne. It features Cooper as the host of a fictional morning news program. The show is structured around spoofs of news segments, interviews, and commercials, and it incorporates a series of sketches featuring appearances from celebrities including Jon Hamm, Whoopi Goldberg, Helen Mirren, Ben Stiller, and Marisa Tomei. Cooper's character is a news anchor who struggles to retain her sanity and positive attitude despite the dramatic upheaval that she is reporting on, which is a commentary on the experience of observing the political, economic, and pandemic-related disruptions throughout the world in 2020 (as is the sarcasm of the title, Everything's Fine).

Reviews for the show were generally positive, with most critics arguing that its satire was insightful but not uniformly successful. The Guardian rated the show 4 out of 5 stars, calling it "a funny and striking document of what living feels like in this fraught and febrile year." A CNN review called the show "on balance impressive, especially factoring in the logistical challenges of turning it around during a pandemic". Variety gave the show a negative review, saying that "Cooper ends up being the straight man in her own comedy special." A New York Times review compared Everything's Fine favorably to the parody news show Saturday Night Live, arguing that Cooper captured the zeitgeist of the news experience in 2020 more successfully than many other contemporary satires, but also asserted that "the comic ideas vary wildly in quality" with jokes that "are hit and miss".

It was announced in August 2020 that Cooper and Cindy Chupack would be producing a comedy show for CBS based on How to Be Successful Without Hurting Men's Feelings. The pilot was not picked up to series. Cooper was listed as one of the "Breakout Stars" of 2020 by Vogue and The New York Times, and as one of five Breakthrough Entertainers of 2020 by the Associated Press. In August 2021, Bleecker Street and Stage 6 Films picked up the worldwide rights to James Ponsoldt's coming of age film Summering, starring Cooper alongside Megan Mullally.

On October 3, 2023, Cooper published her memoir Foolish: Tales of Assimilation, Determination, and Humiliation.

== Personal life ==
Cooper married Jeff Palm, a senior software designer for Google, in February 2015. They divorced in 2021.

== Publications ==
- 100 Tricks to Appear Smart in Meetings. Kansas City: Andrews McMeel Publishing (2016). ISBN 9781449476052. OCLC 944463172.
- Draw What Success Looks Like. Kansas City: Andrews McMeel Publishing (2016). ISBN 9781449476069. OCLC 944470964.
- How to Be Successful Without Hurting Men's Feelings. Kansas City: Andrews McMeel Publishing (2018). ISBN 9781449476076. OCLC 1028881934.
- Tricks to Appear Smart in Meetings 2021 Day-to-Day Calendar. Kansas City: Andrews McMeel Publishing (2020). ISBN 9781524858124
- Foolish: Tales of Assimilation, Determination, and Humiliation. New York: Dutton, (2023), ISBN 9780593473184

== Filmography ==
Year	Title	Role	Note(s)	Ref(s).
2020	The Last Word with Lawrence O'Donnell	guest		
2020	The Tonight Show Starring Jimmy Fallon	guest		
2020	The Ellen DeGeneres Show (2 episodes)	guest		
2020	Home Movie: The Princess Bride	Inigo Montoya	Quibi	
2020	Have You Been Paying Attention?	guest		
2020	Jimmy Kimmel Live!	guest host		
2020	The Late Show with Stephen Colbert	guest		
2020	Sarah Cooper: Everything's Fine	Self	Netflix	
2020	The View	guest		
2020	Late Night with Seth Meyers	guest		
2021	HouseBroken	Lenny, guest	1 episode	
2022	Summering	Karna	Film	
2023	Survival of the Thickest	Sydney	1 episode, Netflix	
2024	Unfrosted	Poppy Northcutt		
2025	Kinda Pregnant	Thrish		
2025	The Housemaid	Pam		

== Awards and nominations ==
Awards and nominations received by Sarah Cooper
Award	Year	Category	Result	Ref.
Adweek Hot List	2020	Digital Creator of the Year	Won	
Streamy Awards	2020	Creator of the Year	Nominated	
Streamy Awards	2020	Subject Award: Comedy	Won	
