= Megan Mullally =

American actress (born 1958)

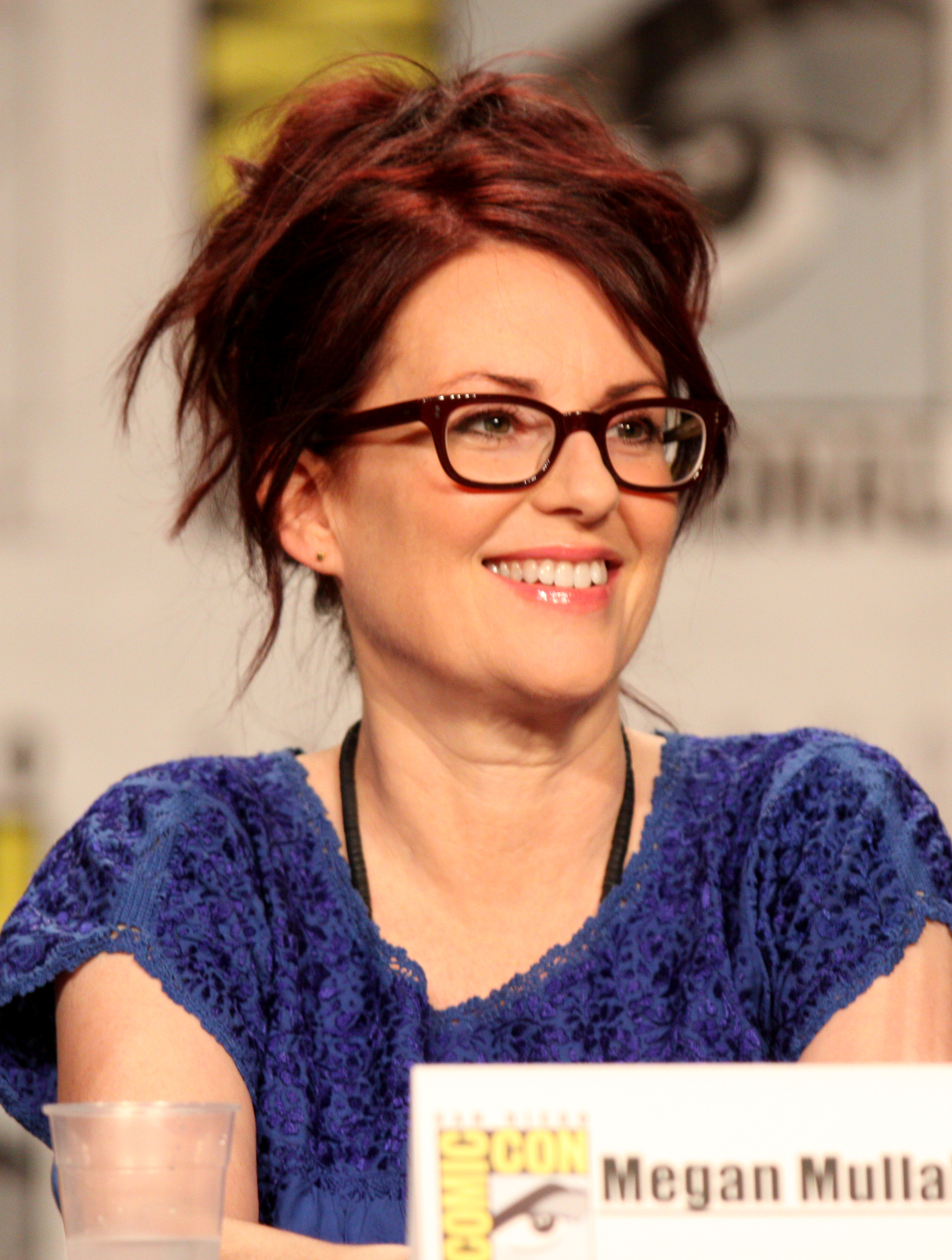
- Mullally at the 2011 San Diego Comic-Con
- Born: November 12, 1958 (age 67); Los Angeles, California, U.S.
- Education: Northwestern University
- Occupation: Actress
- Years active: 1979–present
- Spouses: Michael Katcher (m. 1992; div. 1996) Nick Offerman (m. 2003)
- Awards: Full list
- Website: meganmullally.net

Megan Mullally (born November 12, 1958) is an American actress. She is best known for playing Karen Walker in the NBC sitcom Will & Grace (1998–2006, 2017–2020), for which she received eight Primetime Emmy Award nominations for Outstanding Supporting Actress in a Comedy Series, winning twice, in 2000 and 2006. She also received nominations for numerous other accolades for her portrayal, including seven consecutive Screen Actors Guild Awards nominations for Outstanding Performance by a Female Actor in a Comedy Series, winning three times, in 2001, 2002, and 2003, as well as receiving four Golden Globe Award nominations.

From 2006 to 2007, Mullally hosted the talk show The Megan Mullally Show. Since then, she has been a series regular on several television series, such as In the Motherhood, Party Down, Childrens Hospital, and Breaking In. She has also appeared in guest spots and recurring roles on other comedy series including, Happy Endings, Bob's Burgers, Parks and Recreation, 30 Rock, Up All Night, Boston Legal, The New Adventures of Old Christine, and The Great North. In addition to television, Mullally has also ventured into film, with appearances in Smashed (2012), The Kings of Summer (2013), and Why Him? (2016).

== Early life ==
Mullally was born in Los Angeles, California, the only child of Martha (née Palmer) and Carter Mullally Jr., an actor who was a contract player with Paramount Pictures in the 1950s. Mullally moved to her father's native Oklahoma City, Oklahoma, at age six. She is of English, Irish and Scandinavian ancestry. She studied ballet from age six and performed at the Oklahoma City Ballet during high school, also studying at the School of American Ballet in New York City.

Following her graduation from Casady School in Oklahoma City, Mullally attended Northwestern University in Evanston, Illinois, where she studied English literature and art history. After her sophomore year, she began acting in theater in downtown Chicago. By junior year, she was performing in eight shows per week. She later dropped out of Northwestern to pursue acting.

== Career ==
=== Television ===
One of Mullally's earliest acting spots was on a McDonald's commercial that also featured John Goodman. She made her series debut in 1986 in The Ellen Burstyn Show. She subsequently guest-starred on sitcoms such as Seinfeld, Frasier, Wings, Herman's Head, Ned and Stacey, Mad About You, Caroline in the City, 3rd Rock from the Sun and Just Shoot Me!. She played a central character in a season-five episode of Murder, She Wrote, "Coal Miner's Slaughter", recalling in 2012, "I hadn't gotten a job for so long, and I was in a complete panic because I didn't know how I was going to pay my rent. So I get a call one day from my agent that I'd gotten offered a guest role, and it paid $5,000. I literally fell down onto my knees and testified and wept. I played some former protégée of Jessica Fletcher. It's one of my favorite things I've ever shot."

In 1989, Mullally tested for the role of Elaine Benes on Seinfeld. The role was eventually given to Julia Louis-Dreyfus. In 1998, Mullally landed the role of Karen Walker, Grace Adler's abrasive, pill-popping assistant, in the NBC sitcom Will & Grace. She won the Primetime Emmy Award for Outstanding Supporting Actress in a Comedy Series in both 2000 and 2006, and was nominated in 2001, 2002, 2003, 2004, 2005 and again for the revival in 2018. She won the Screen Actors Guild Award for Outstanding Performance by a Female Actor in a Comedy Series three times, in 2002, 2003 and 2004, and with cast members Eric McCormack, Debra Messing, and Sean Hayes, she shared the Screen Actors Guild Award for Outstanding Performance by an Ensemble in a Comedy Series in 2001. She is the first of only two actresses to win a SAG Award three years in a row. She was nominated each year from 2000 until 2003 for the Golden Globe Award for Best Supporting Actress – Series, Miniseries or Television Film.

In 2005, Mullally saw comedian and actor Bill Hader performing with his Second City class in Los Angeles, and shortly thereafter brought Hader to the attention of Saturday Night Live producer Lorne Michaels. Also in 2005, Mullally was awarded the Women in Film Lucy Award in recognition of her "innovation in creative works that have enhanced the perception of women through the medium of television".

Following Will & Grace, Mullally hosted her own talk show, The Megan Mullally Show from 2006 to 2007. She has hosted Saturday Night Live, guest-hosted the Late Show with David Letterman, hosted the 2006 TV Land Awards, and been a featured performer twice on the Tony Awards. She has been featured in advertisements for M&M's, Old Navy, CheapTickets.com, and I Can't Believe It's Not Butter!

Mullally guest-starred as an adoption case worker for Liz Lemon in the third-season premiere of the NBC sitcom 30 Rock and returned to play the same character two additional times during the show's run. Other appearances include Kathy Griffin: My Life on the D-List, Campus Ladies, director/actor David Wain's "Wainy Days", an episode of HBO's Funny or Die, and the Funny or Die web video "That's What She Said".

Mullally guest-starred seven times as Tammy Swanson on the NBC series Parks and Recreation, in the episodes "Ron and Tammy", "Ron & Tammy: Part Two", "Li'l Sebastian", "Ron and Tammys", "The Trial of Leslie Knope", "Ron and Diane", "Ron and Jammy", and "A Parks and Recreation Special". Mullally plays the role of the second ex-wife of the character Ron Swanson, who is played by her real-life husband, Nick Offerman. Offerman also had two different roles on Mullally's show Will & Grace, playing a plumber and chef.

Also in 2009, Mullally starred in the ABC sitcom In the Motherhood. Based on the original web series, the television adaptation focuses on three mothers. She played Rosemary opposite Cheryl Hines and Jessica St. Clair. The series was poorly received and was canceled by ABC due to low ratings after airing five out of seven episodes produced.

Mullally co-starred in 2010 as Lydia on the Starz ensemble series Party Down. Mullally co-starred as "Chief" on the Adult Swim series Childrens Hospital. In 2011, Mullally began a recurring role as Dana Hartz, the mother of Penny (Casey Wilson), on the ABC sitcom Happy Endings. In the following months, Mullally joined the series Breaking In for its second season in 2012, after which the show was canceled. Also in 2012, Mullally joined the first season of Bob's Burgers as Aunt Gayle. She reprised the role in subsequent episodes along with several minor roles. Mullally rejoined the Will & Grace cast as Karen upon the show's revival, which ran for three seasons from 2017 to 2020. In 2024, Mullally and Offerman starred together as Jean and Gene, respectively, in season 4 of the Netflix series The Umbrella Academy.

=== Theater ===
Mullally made her Broadway debut as Marty in the 1994 revival of Grease, and subsequently appeared as Rosemary in the hit 1995 revival of How to Succeed in Business Without Really Trying opposite Matthew Broderick. In 2007, Mullally starred as Elizabeth in Mel Brooks' original Broadway musical Young Frankenstein. She can be heard on the cast albums of all three productions.

In 1996, she starred in You Never Know at the Pasadena Playhouse. Mullally appeared in 2000 as Pamela in the multiple award-winning production of Chuck Mee's The Berlin Circle, for which she won both the LA Weekly Theatre Award and the Backstage West Garland Award. Mullally starred as Beverly in the acclaimed production of Adam Bock's The Receptionist at the Odyssey Theatre (notably, the longest sold-out run of a show in that theatre's history), for which she was awarded the 2010 Backstage West Garland Award for Best Performance by an Actress. On 3 April 2014, she portrayed Miss Adelaide in a one night only concert of Guys and Dolls opposite Nathan Lane, Sierra Boggess and Patrick Wilson at Carnegie Hall

From April 13 to June 1, 2014, Mullally starred alongside her real-life husband, Nick Offerman, in Annapurna at the off-Broadway Acorn Theatre on New York's 42nd Street Theatre Row. In 2014 Mullally starred in the Broadway performance of It's Only a Play with F. Murray Abraham, Matthew Broderick, Stockard Channing, Rupert Grint, Nathan Lane and Micah Stock. The show opened at the Gerald Schoenfeld Theatre on October 9, 2014, and played through January 18, 2015. It then opened at the Bernard B. Jacobs Theatre on January 23, 2015, and closed on June 7, 2015. The show played 48 previews and 274 performances. In June 2021, Mullally was set to appear as "Reno Sweeney" in Anything Goes at the Barbican Theatre in London for a strictly limited season, but had to pull out due to an injury.

=== Music ===
Mullally is a member of the band Supreme Music Program. SMP has released three albums: The Sweetheart Break-In, Big as a Berry and Free Again!. Mullally and Stephanie Hunt formed the band Nancy and Beth in 2012. They went on tour in March 2013, along with Mullally's husband, Offerman. Nancy and Beth performed at Lincoln Center as part of its American Songbook Series on February 13, 2019, and toured the US in April and May 2019, beginning in Los Angeles and ending in New York City. The band subsequently toured Australia in June 2019, beginning in Hobart and ending in Brisbane.

=== Film ===
Mullally's first film role was playing a call girl in 1983's Risky Business. Mullally has also appeared in Marc Forster's Sundance competition entry Everything Put Together, Anywhere but Here with Susan Sarandon and Natalie Portman, About Last Night with Demi Moore and Rob Lowe, Speaking of Sex with James Spader, and Stealing Harvard with Tom Green and Jason Lee. Mullally played a singing teacher in the 2009 film remake of Fame, and can be heard on the soundtrack recording. Additionally, Mullally sang the song "Long John Blues" (performed on-screen by Kristen Bell) in 2010's Burlesque. She played one of the leads' mothers in the 2013 indie film The Kings of Summer and Mrs. Van Camp in the movie G.B.F. Mullally played Barb Fleming in the 2016 film Why Him? In 2017, Mullally appeared in Janicza Bravo's first full-length feature, Lemon, which debuted at Sundance Film Festival.

In August 2021, Bleecker Street and Stage 6 Films picked up the worldwide rights to James Ponsoldt's coming of age film Summering, starring Mullally alongside Sarah Cooper. On October 6, 2023, A24's Dicks: The Musical was released, starring Mullally alongside Nathan Lane, Megan Thee Stallion, and the movie's writers, Josh Sharp and Aaron Jackson. The movie musical is an R-rated twist on The Parent Trap, where two grown men discover they are identical twins separated at birth, and plot to switch places in order to get their parents back together. Mullally plays "Evelyn", the boys' mother. She can be heard singing her songs on the movie's soundtrack recording.

== Published works ==
Mullally and husband Nick Offerman wrote The Greatest Love Story Ever Told, published by Dutton on October 2, 2018. The book is a New York Times Bestseller. The two reveal the full story behind their romance in chapters on religion, family, and more.

== Personal life ==
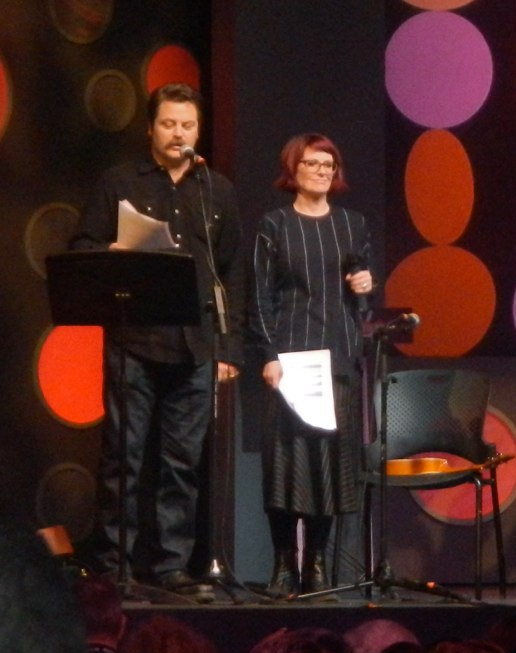
Nick Offerman and Mullally hosting the 2014 Sundance Film Festival awards ceremony

In 1992, Mullally married Michael Katcher, a talent agent, in Los Angeles. They divorced in 1996. Mullally met fellow actor and future husband Nick Offerman in 2000 while acting in The Berlin Circle, a play produced by the Evidence Room Theatre Company; they married three years later in 2003.

While they were dating, Offerman appeared in a guest role on Will & Grace, in a 2001 Thanksgiving episode. Offerman appeared again, in a different role, in the season 9 episode "Friends and Lover". The couple have also appeared together in films such as The Kings of Summer and Smashed and the television series Parks and Recreation and The Umbrella Academy, and they also performed voice work together in Bob's Burgers, Hotel Transylvania 2, and The Great North. In 2019, they launched the podcast In Bed with Nick and Megan, discussing their personal lives and interviewing guests.

In a 1999 interview with The Advocate magazine, Mullally commented: "I consider myself bisexual, and my philosophy is, everyone innately is." She brought the subject up again in 2009.

== Filmography ==
=== Film ===
Year	Title	Role	Notes
1983	Risky Business	Call Girl	
1985	Once Bitten	Suzette	
1986	Last Resort	Jessica Lollar	
1986	About Last Night...	Pat	
1986	Blue Velvet	Louise	
1991	Queens Logic	Dolores	
1999	Anywhere but Here	Woman Buying Car	
1999	Best Man in Grass Creek	Co-Worker	
2000	Everything Put Together	Barbie	
2001	Monkeybone	Kimmy Miley	
2001	Speaking of Sex	Jennifer Klink	
2002	Stealing Harvard	Patty Plummer	
2004	Teacher's Pet	Adele	Voice
2005	Rebound	Principal Walsh	
2006	New York	Jasmine	
2007	Bee Movie	Trudy	Voice
2009	Fame	Fran Rowan	
2010	New York 2	Jasmine	
2010	Burlesque	Nikki's singing voice	
2012	Smashed	Principal Barnes	
2012	What to Expect When You're Expecting	Cameo	
2013	The Kings of Summer	Mrs. Keenan	
2013	G.B.F.	Mrs. Van Camp	
2014	Apartment Troubles	Aunt Kimberley	
2014	Ernest & Celestine	Lucienne	Voice; English dub
2014	Date and Switch	Patricia	
2014	New York 3	Jasmine	
2014	Alexander and the Terrible, Horrible, No Good, Very Bad Day	Nina	
2015	Hotel Transylvania 2	Linda Loughran	Voice
2016	Why Him?	Barb Fleming	
2017	Lemon	Simone	
2017	Infinity Baby	Hester	
2017	The Disaster Artist	Mrs. Sestero	
2017	Oh Lucy!	Hannah	
2019	Where'd You Go, Bernadette	Judy Toll	
2022	Summering	Stacie	
2022	Crush	Angie Evans	
2023	First Time Female Director	Marjory	
2023	Dicks: The Musical	Evelyn	
2024	The Fabulous Four	Alice	
2025	Sovereign	Beverly	Voice
2026	Chasing Summer	Layanne	
TBA	Goodbye Girl †		Filming

=== Television ===
Year	Title	Role	Notes
1981	The Children Nobody Wanted	Sharon	Television film
1985	First Steps	Cathy	Television film
1986	Tall Tales & Legends	Posy Peasley	Episode: "Pecos Bill"
1986	American Playhouse	Lilah	Episode: "Under the Biltmore Clock"
1986–1987	The Ellen Burstyn Show	Molly Brewer Ross	Main role
1988	Murder, She Wrote	Molly Connors	Episode: "Coal Miner's Slaughter"
1989	Almost Grown	Bride	Episode: "The Hat That Fell from Space"
1989	China Beach	Cindy	Episode: "The World: Part 2"
1990	Wings	Cindy	Episode: "There Once Was a Girl from Nantucket"
1990	Rainbow Drive	Ava Zieff	Television film
1991	Dear John	Molly	Episode: "Molly and Me"
1991	My Life and Times	Susan Valentine	Main role
1991	Herman's Head	Yvonne	Episode: "Fatal Distraction"
1992	Timeless Tales from Hallmark	Ballerina (voice)	Episode: "The Steadfast Tin Soldier"
1992	Fish Police	Pearl White (voice)	Main role
1992	Rachel Gunn, R.N.	Becky Jo	Main role
1993	I Yabba-Dabba Do!	Pebbles Flintstone (voice)	Television film
1993	Seinfeld	Betsy	Episode: "The Implant"
1993	Hollyrock-a-Bye Baby	Additional voices	Television film
1993	A Flintstone Family Christmas	Pebbles Flintstone (voice)	Television film
1994	Batman: The Animated Series	Cindy (voice)	Episode: "House and Garden"
1994	Couples	Beth	Television film
1997	Ned and Stacey	Wendy	Episode: "Where My Third Nepal Is Sheriff"
1997	Frasier	Beth Armstrong	Episode: "Four for the Seesaw"
1997	Mad About You	Jane	Episode: "Guardianhood"
1997	The Naked Truth	Vanessa	Episode: "He Ain't Famous, He's My Brother"
1997	Caroline in the City	Vanessa Cassidy	Episode: "Caroline and the Decanter"
1997	Extreme Ghostbusters	Additional voices	Episode: "The True Face of a Monster"
1998	Just Shoot Me!	Stephanie Griffin-Cooper	Episode: "Amblushed"
1998	Winchell	June Winchell	Television film
1998–2006, 2017–2020	Will & Grace	Karen Walker	Main role; 244 episodes
2000	3rd Rock from the Sun	Renata Albright	Episode: "Les Liaisons Dickgereuses"
2002	King of the Hill	Teresa (voice)	Episode: "Beer and Loathing"
2002	The Pact	Melanie Gold	Television film
2003	40 Greatest Men in Country Music	Herself (host)	3 episodes
2004	Saturday Night Live	Host	Episode: "Megan Mullally/Clay Aiken"
2005	Peep and the Big Wide World	Pink Quack (voice)	2 episodes
2006	How I Met Your Mother	Barney's Mother (voice)	2 episodes (uncredited)
2006	Campus Ladies	Ms. Powell	Episode: "The Dare"
2006–2007	The Megan Mullally Show	Herself (host)	Main role
2007	Boston Legal	Renata Hill	Episode: "The Bride Wore Blood"
2008	Bad Mother's Handbook	Nan	Television film
2008	The New Adventures of Old Christine	Margaret	Episode: "Unidentified Funk"
2008–2013	30 Rock	Bev	3 episodes
2008–2016	Childrens Hospital	Chief	Main role
2009	In the Motherhood	Rosemary	Main role
2009–2015, 2020	Parks and Recreation	Tammy Swanson II	Recurring role (seasons 2-7)
2010, 2023	Party Down	Lydia Dunfree	Main role
2011–present	Bob's Burgers	Gayle Genarro, various voices	Recurring role
2011–2013	Happy Endings	Dana Hartz	3 episodes
2012	Up All Night	Shayna Mund	2 episodes
2012	Breaking In	Veronica Mann	Main role
2012–2015	Randy Cunningham: 9th Grade Ninja	Mrs. Marilyn Driscoll (voice)	Recurring role
2013	Out There	Rose Stevens (voice)	Main role
2013	Web Therapy	Franny Marshall	3 episodes
2013–2015	Axe Cop	Anita, various voices	Main role
2013–2016	Sofia the First	Miss Nettle (voice)	3 episodes
2014	Trophy Wife	Cricket	2 episodes
2015	You, Me and the Apocalypse	Leanne	Main role
2016	Life in Pieces	Mary-Lynn	Episode: "Annulled Roommate Pill Shower"
2017	Dimension 404	Director Stevens	Episode: "Bob"
2019	25th Screen Actors Guild Awards	Herself (host)	Television special
2021	Cinema Toast	Eunice Doolittle (voice)	Episode: "Familiesgiving"
2021–2025	The Great North	Alyson Lefebvrere (voice)	Recurring role
2021–present	The Simpsons	Sarah Wiggum (voice)	Recurring role
2022	37th Independent Spirit Awards	Herself (co-host)	Television special
2022	Reservation Dogs	Anna	Episode: "Run"
2022	American Dad!	Judge (voice)	Episode: "The Three Fs"
2023	Carol & the End of the World	Janette (voice)	2 episodes
2023–2024	Percy Jackson and the Olympians	Alecto	3 episodes
2024	The Umbrella Academy	Dr. Jean Thibedeau	Recurring role
2025	The Righteous Gemstones	Lori Milsap	Recurring role

== Stage ==
Theatre credits
Year	Title	Role	Venue	Refs.
1979	Bagtime	Performer	Wisdom Bridge Theatre, Chicago	
1983	What I Did Last Summer	Performer	Northlight Theatre, Chicago	
1984	What The Butler Saw	Performer	Northlight Theatre, Chicago	
1984	City on the Make	Performer	Northlight Theatre, Chicago	
1991	You Never Know	Maria	Pasadena Playhouse, California	
1994	Grease	Marty	Eugene O'Neill Theatre, Broadway	
1994	How to Succeed in Business Without Really Trying	Rosemary	La Jolla Playhouse, California	
1995	How to Succeed in Business Without Really Trying	Rosemary	46th Street Theater, Broadway	
1999	Sweetheart	Performer	Coast Playhouse, Los Angeles	
2000	The Berlin Circle	Pamela Dalrymple	Evidence Room Theater, Los Angeles	
2003	Mayhem	Susan	Evidence Room Theater, Los Angeles	
2007	Young Frankenstein	Elizabeth	Paramount Theatre, Seattle	
2007	Young Frankenstein	Elizabeth	Hilton Theater, Broadway	
2009	The Receptionist	Beverly	Odyssey Theatre, Los Angeles	
2013	Annapurna	Emma	Odyssey Theatre, Los Angeles	
2014	Guys and Dolls	Miss Adelaide	Carnegie Hall, New York	
2014	Annapurna	Emma	The New Group, Off-Broadway	
2014	It's Only a Play	Julia Budder	Gerald Schoenfeld Theater, Broadway	
2026	Iceboy!	Vera Vimm	Goodman Theatre, Chicago	
