= Summering =

- Theatrical release poster
- Directed by: James Ponsoldt
- Written by: James Ponsoldt; Benjamin Percy
- Produced by: P. Jennifer Dana; Peter Block; James Ponsoldt
- Starring: Lia Barnett; Lake Bell; Sarah Cooper; Ashley Madekwe; Madalen Mills; Megan Mullally; Eden Grace Redfield; Sanai Victoria
- Cinematography: Greta Zozula
- Edited by: Darrin Navarro
- Music by: Drum & Lace
- Production companies: 3311 Productions; 1978 Films; A Bigger Boat; City Boy Hands
- Distributed by: Bleecker Street (North America); Stage 6 Films (International)
- Release dates: January 22, 2022 (Sundance); August 12, 2022 (United States)
- Running time: 87 minutes
- Country: United States
- Language: English
- Box office: $64,369

Summering is a 2022 American coming-of-age drama film co-written, directed, and produced by James Ponsoldt. It stars Lia Barnett, Lake Bell, Sarah Cooper, Ashley Madekwe, Madalen Mills, Megan Mullally, Eden Grace Redfield, and Sanai Victoria. It was released on August 12, 2022, by Bleecker Street.

== Plot summary ==
The weekend prior to the beginning of middle school, which are the last days of their childhood and summer, four girls struggling with the harsh reality of growing up find themselves embarking on a mysterious adventure.

== Cast ==
- Lia Barnett as Daisy
- Madalen Mills as Dina
- Eden Grace Redfield as Mari
- Sanai Victoria as Lola
- Megan Mullally as Stacie
- Lake Bell as Laura
- Ashley Madekwe as Joy
- Sarah Cooper as Karna
- Dale McKeel as Daisy's Dad
- Willow Corner-Bettwieser as Carol

== Release ==
In August 2021, it was announced that Bleecker Street and Stage 6 Films have acquired American and international distribution rights to the film respectively.

The film premiered at the Sundance Film Festival on January 22, 2022. It was originally scheduled to be released on July 15, 2022 and it was delayed by August 12, 2022.

== Reception ==
The film has a 34% approval rating on Rotten Tomatoes based on 68 reviews, with an average rating of 4.8/10. The website's critics consensus reads: "Summering is a harmless enough coming-of-age story, but there are far superior -- and far less saccharine -- entries in this crowded genre." Metacritic rated the film a 50 out of 100 based on 17 critic reviews, indicating "mixed or average reviews".

Pete Hammond of Deadline Hollywood gave the film a positive review and wrote, "There are things to talk about after the movie ends. And it doesn’t ever talk down to its intended audience. If anything, the adults are the ones desperately in need of connecting with their inner kid." Fred Topel of United Press International also gave the film a positive review and wrote, "Summering is like a female Amblin movie."

Guy Lodge of Variety gave the film a negative review and wrote, "Too much of Summering, however, plays out in an unsatisfying middle ground: embedded neither in real life, nor in its heroines’ restless, malleable imaginations." Angie Han of The Hollywood Reporter also gave the film a negative review and wrote, "But alas, its potential for magic is dulled by uneven performances, unconvincing chemistry and an uninspiring script." Natalia Winkelman of IndieWire graded the film a C− and wrote, "As is, Summering is too scattered and silly for us to really care."
