= Madalen Mills =

American actress (born 2009)

- Born: January 2009 (age 17); Atlanta, Georgia, U.S.
- Occupation: Actress
- Years active: 2020-present

Madalen Mills (born January 2009) is an American actress. She is known for her role as Journey in the 2020 Netflix Christmas musical film Jingle Jangle: A Christmas Journey. She also appeared in the 2022 film The Tiger Rising.

Mills was born in Atlanta and raised in Tuscaloosa, Alabama, where she attended Tuscaloosa Academy and the Tuscaloosa Magnet School.

== Filmography ==
Year	Film	Role
2020	Jingle Jangle: A Christmas Journey	Journey
2022	The Tiger Rising	Sistine Bailey
2022	Summering	Dina
