= Hawaiʻi International Film Festival =

Annual film festival in Hawaii, U.S.

- Location: Honolulu, Hawaii, U.S.
- Founded: 1981
- Artistic director: Anderson Le
- No. of films: 300+ per year
- Festival date: October - November, every year
- Language: International
- Website: hiff.org

The Hawaiʻi International Film Festival (HIFF) is an annual film festival held in the United States state of Hawaiʻi.

HIFF focuses on Asian-Pacific cinema, education, and showcasing the work of new and emerging filmmakers. HIFF's main festival takes place annually in Honolulu in October and November, with additional screenings and events held across the Hawaiian Islands of Oʻahu, Hawaiʻi, Kauaʻi and Maui.

HIFF is the only statewide film festival in the United States, and the only Academy Award-qualifying film festival with a focus on Native Hawaiian and Pacific Islander filmmaking.

== History ==
Jury members Sun Daolin, Nagisa Ōshima, Donald Richie, Roger Ebert, and Aruna Vasudev, join Jeannette Paulson at HIFF in 1983

HIFF was founded in 1981 by Jeannette Paulson Hereniko as a project of the East-West Center, an independent research institute located at the University of Hawaiʻi at Mānoa campus in Honolulu. Due to this academic association, HIFF prominently featured academic seminars and discussions in its early years, and was delivered free to the public. The relationship between HIFF and the East-West Center ended in 1994.

Over the next decade, HIFF introduced a Neighbour Island program with screenings in Hawaiʻi Island and Maui, facilitated the development of the East-West Film Journal (1986-1994), and launched the East-West Center Film Tour (1989-1993) as a travelling exhibition in the continental United States. Film critics Donald Richie and Roger Ebert had close personal relationships with the festival and frequently attended before their deaths.

HIFF was spun off as an independent not-for-profit entity in 1990, and ended its partnership with the East-West Center in 1994. Due to contractions in state funding, the festival introduced paid ticketing in 1997.

The festival grew considerably in the early 2000s by placing a greater focus on commercial and educational partnerships. Louis Vuitton was the festival’s presenting sponsor between 2002 and 2008, later replaced by Halekulani in 2011. HIFF introduced a student film showcase in 2004, Following the establishment of the Academy for Creative Media at the University of Hawaiʻi at Mānoa that same year.

HIFF celebrated its 40th edition in 2020 during the COVID-19 pandemic with a hybrid festival combining online video on demand streaming with drive-in theaters and a small number of conventional cinema screenings.

HIFF launched its industry development program, HIFILM, in 2023. HIFILM is the year-round industry and professional development initiative of the HIFF, dedicated to supporting filmmakers, content creators, and media professionals in Hawai‘i and across the Asia-Pacific region. Through workshops, masterclasses, networking events, mentorship programs, filmmaker labs, and the annual HIFILM Industry Conference, the program fosters career development, creative collaboration, and industry access for emerging and established storytellers. HIFILM expands HIFF’s mission beyond film exhibition by strengthening Hawai‘i's creative economy and connecting local talent with international film, television, and new media professionals.

== Sections ==
From its early history, HIFF has maintained a programming focus on films from the Asia-Pacific, with an emphasis on new and emerging filmmakers. As of 2025, HIFF has fourteen feature film programs, in addition to its short film programs.

- Documentaries: a selection of US and international documentary feature films
- Eat.Drink.Film: feature films themed around food and global culinary culture.
- HIFF Extreme: genre and horror films screened in late night slots throughout the festival.
- Indigenous Lens: a collection of feature and short films produced and directed by Indigenous outside of Hawaiʻi.
- Made in Hawaiʻi: a showcase of local short and feature filmmaking from the state of Hawaiʻi, alongside films produced by the Native Hawaiian diaspora. After the festival each year, a selection of Made in Hawaiʻi films are made available as in-flight entertainment on Hawaiian Airlines flights.
- New American Perspectives: a program of feature films directed by immigrant filmmakers and artists in the United States, presented by the Vilcek Foundation.
- Pacific Showcase: a program of short and feature films from Pacific Islander filmmakers, produced in partnership with Pacific Islanders in Communications.
- Panorama: a selection of feature films selected from the international film festival circuit.
- Spotlight on China: a selection of feature films from the People's Republic of China.
- Spotlight on Hong Kong: a selection of feature films from Hong Kong, presented by Hong Kong Economic and Trade Office. This spotlight is often accompanied by a high-profile visiting filmmaking, including Wong Kar-wai, Ann Hui and John Woo.
- Spotlight on Japan: a program of popular and art films from Japan.
- Spotlight on Okinawa: select screenings of films from Okinawa.
- Spotlight on Taiwan: feature films produced in Taiwan, presented by Taiwan Academy and Taiwan's Ministry of Culture.
- Short film programs

== Awards ==
HIFF annually presents a series of prizes for established and emerging filmmakers, announced at its Awards Gala at Halekulani. In addition to its main competitions, the festival also honors filmmakers for special accomplishments and contributions to cinema culture.

=== Honors ===
HIFF annually honors filmmakers for outstanding contributions to world cinema and the arts. The Halekulani Career Achievement Award is given to filmmakers with an established body of work for significant contributions to the arts. The Halekulani Maverick Award is given to accomplished artists and filmmakers with unconventional career trajectories, often to rising stars of the global film industry. The Pacific Islanders in Communications Trailblazer Award honors a cinema artist of Pacific Islander descent for producing award-winning work in independent and global cinema. In 2020, HIFF introduced the Halekulani Golden Maile for Career Achievement. The first recipient of the Golden Maile was Ann Hui.

Previous HIFF honorees include Awkwafina, Joan Chen, Sonny Chiba, Maggie Cheung, Destin Daniel Cretton, Dave Filoni, Stan Grant, Sterlin Harjo, Josie Ho, Samuel L. Jackson, Jung Woo-Sung, Hirokazu Kore-eda, Jason Scott Lee, Dana Ledoux Miller, Moon So-ri, Elisabeth Moss, Randall Park, Albert Pyun, Keala Settle, Taika Waititi, Ken Watanabe, Wong Kar-Wai, John Woo, Steven Yeun, and many other Hollywood luminaries.

In 2022, HIFF awarded festival founder, Jeannette Paulson Hereniko with the inaugural HIFF Legacy Award for her lifetime of dedication and contributions to film and cinema in Hawaiʻi and many film festivals around the world.

=== Kau Ka Hōkū Award ===
The Hawaiian Airlines Kau Ka Hōkū (Shooting Star) award is HIFF's main competitive prize and is awarded to emerging filmmakers for their first or second feature film by an international jury. Both fiction and non-fiction feature films are nominated by the festival programmers and adjudicated by an international jury.

Year	Film	Director
2018	People's Republic of Desire	Hao Wu
2019	37 Seconds	HIKARI
2021	Dark Red Forest	Jin Huaqing
2022	Bad Axe	David Siev
2023	Asog	Seán Devlin
2024	Molokaʻi Bound	Alika Tengan
2025	Ky Nam Inn	Leon Le

=== Made in Hawaiʻi Film Awards ===
The Made in Hawaiʻi Film Awards is presented by the Nichols Family Fund and Hawaii Film Office for feature and short films produced by local filmmakers.

Year	Film	Director	
1990	My Aunt May	Roland Tharpe	
1991	Hawaiʻi: Beyond the Feathered Gods	Paul Atkins	
1992	Simple Courage	Stephanie Castillo	
1993	From Hawaiʻi to the Holocaust	Judy Weightman / Ryan Sexton	
1994	Ganbare	Robert Bates	
1995	Words, Earth and Aloha	Eddie Kamae	
1996	Lemon Tree Billiards House	Tim Savage	
1997	E Ola Ka ʻOlelo Hawaiʻi	Na Maka O Ka ʻAina	
1998	Kahoʻolawe	David Kalama Jr	
1999	Red Turtle Rising	Jay April	
2000	Kaʻililauokekoa	Kalaʻiokona Ontai	
2001	Blood of the Samurai	Aaron Yamasato	
2002			
2003	The Ride	Nathan Kurosawa	
2004	Silent Years	James Sereno	
2005	Fishbowl	Kayo Hatta	
2006	Na Kamalei: Men of Hula	Lisette Marie Flannery	
2018	Bethany Hamilton: Unstoppable	Aaron Lieber	Made in Hawaii Audience Award
2018	The Moon and The Night	Erin Lau	Made in Hawaii Best Short
2019	Molokaʻi Bound	Alika Maikau	Made in Hawaii Best Short
2019	Down on the Sidewalk in Waikiki	Justyn Ah Chong	Made in Hawaii Best Short, Second Place
2020	Hawaiian Soul	ʻĀina Paikai	Best Short + Audience Award Short
2020	Waikiki	Chris Kahunahana	Best Feature + Best Cinematography
2021	River of Small Gods	Bradley Tangonan	Best Short
2021	I Was a Simple Man	Christopher Makoto Yogi	Best Feature
2022	The Wind & the Reckoning	David L. Cunningham	Best Feature
2022	Inheritance	Erin Lau	Best Short
2022	Pōʻele Wai (Dark Water / As the Water Darkens)	Tiare Ribeaux	Honorable Mention (Short Film)
2023	Hōkūleʻa: Finding the Language of the Navigator	Ty Sanga	Best Feature
2023	Aikāne	Daniel Sousa, Dean Hamer and Joe Wilson	Best Short
2023	My Partner	Keliʻi Grace	Honorable Mention (Feature)
2024	Molokaʻi Bound	Alika Tengan	Best Narrative Feature
2024	Standing Above the Clouds	Jalena Keane-Lee	Best Documentary Feature
2024	The Queen's Flowers	Ciara Lacy	Best Short Film

=== Shorts Jury Awards ===
Recipients of HIFF's Best Short Film Award and HIFF's Best Made in Hawaiʻi Short Film Award are eligible for consideration in the Animated Short Film/Live Action Short Film category of the Academy AwardsⓇ in the concurrent season, without the standard theatrical run and provided the films comply with Academy rules.

Year	Film	Director	Award
2022	The Red Suitcase	Cyrus Neshvad	HIFF Best Short Film Award
2022	Kumu Niu	Alex Cantatore	Deep Blue Environmental Shorts Award
2023	Closing Dynasty	Lloyd Lee Choi	HIFF Best Short Film Award
2023	Spear, Spatula, Submarine: Floridians Fight to Take Back Their Waters	Shannon Morrall	Deep Blue Environmental Shorts Award
2024	Chamoru: A Lost Language	Brian Muna	HIFF Best Short Film Award
2024	Talk To Me	Jimmy Ming Shum	Honorable Mention

=== NETPAC Award ===
Since 2000, HIFF has partnered with the Network for the Promotion of Asian Cinema to deliver the NETPAC Award for outstanding filmmaking in Asia and is the only film festival in the United States to present the award.

Year	Film	Director	Country
2000	Breaking the Silence	Sun Zhou	China
2001	Devils on the Doorstep	Jiang Wen	China
2002	Eyes of a Beauty	Guan Hu	China
2003			
2004	Peep "TV" Show	Yutaka Tsuchiya	Japan
2005	Season of the Horse	Ning Cai	China
2006	4:30	Royston Tan	Singapore
2007	Owl and the Sparrow	Stephane Gauger	Vietnam
2008	Brutus - The Adventure	Tara Illenberger	Philippines
2009	Castaway on the Moon	Lee Hae-jun	South Korea
2010	Monga	Doze Chen-Zer Niu	Taiwan ROC
2011	Hanaan	Ruslan Pak	South Korea, Uzbekistan
2012	Aparisyon (Apparition)	Isabel Sandoval (credited as Vincent Sandoval)	Philippines
2013	Monsoon Shootout	Amit Kumar	India
2014	Titli	Kanu Behl	India
2015	The Kids	Sunny Yu	Taiwan
2016	Knife in the Clear Water	Wan Xuebo	China
2017	One Thousand Ropes	Tusi Tamasese	New Zealand
2018	Still Human	Oliver Chan	Hong Kong
2019	Another Child	Yoon-Seok Kim	South Korea
2021	Anima	Cao Jinling	China
2022	Kāinga	Ghazaleh Golbakhsh, Nahyeon Lee, Angeline Loo, HASH (Hash Perambalam), Asuka Sylvie, Yamin Tun, Julie Zhu, Michelle Ang	Aotearoa New Zealand
2023	If Only I Could Hibernate	Zoljargal Purevdashi	France, Mongolia
2024	Sister Midnight	Karan Kandahari	

=== Pasifika Award ===
In 2022, HIFF partnered with Pacific Islanders in Communications to present the inaugural Pasifika Award for Best Feature Film.

Year	Film	Director	Country
2022	Whina	Paula Whetu Jones and James Napier Robertson	Aotearoa (New Zealand)
2023	No Māori Allowed	Corinna Hunziker	Aotearoa (New Zealand)
2024	We Were Dangerous	Josephine Stewart-Tewhiu	Aoteroa (New Zealand)

=== New American Perspectives ===
From 2007 to 2015, HIFF partnered with the Vilcek Foundation to curate the New American Filmmakers program to celebrate the work of foreign-born filmmakers and cinema artists currently contributing to American cinema. In 2019, this program was relaunched as the New American Perspectives.

Year	Film	Delegate	Country of Birth
2007	Owl and the Sparrow	Stephane Gauger (Director)	Vietnam
2007	Finishing the Game	Justin Lin (Director)	Taiwan
2007	The Rebel	Charlie Nguyen (Director)	Vietnam
2007	The GateKeeper of Emmyoin	Reiko Tahara (Director)	Japan
2007		Max Uesugi (Director)	Japan
2008	Chief (Short Film)	Chief Sielu Avea (Actor)	Samoa
2008	Long Story Short	Christine Choy (Director)	China
2008	Vietnam Overtures	Stephane Gauger (Director)	Vietnam
2008	Prince of the Himalayas	Sherwood Hu (Director)	China
2008	Someplace Else	Kai-Duc Luong (Director)	Cambodia
2008	Ocean of Pearls	Sarab Neelam (Director)	India
2009	A Village Called Versailles	S. Leo Chiang (Director)	Taiwan
2009	Prince of Broadway	Karren Karagulian (Actor)	Armenia
2009	The People I've Slept With	Quentin Lee (Director)	Hong Kong
2009	Bombay Summer	Joseph Mathew-Varghese (Director)	India
2009	White on Rice	Hiroshi Watanabe (Actor)	Japan
2010	Dog Sweat	Hossein Keshavarz (Director)	Iran
2010	Au Revoir Taipei	In-Ah Lee (Producer)	Germany
2010	Apart Together	Lisa Lu (Actress)	China
2010	Beijing Taxi	Miao Wang (Director)	China
2011	The Price of Sex	Mimi Chakarova (Director)	Bulgaria
2011	Living in Seduced Circumstances	Ian Gamazon (Director)	Philippines
2011	Skateistan: Four Wheels and a Board in Kabul	Nadia Hennirch (Screenwriter)	Germany
2011	Almost Perfect	Bertha Bay-Sa Pan (Director)	Taiwan
2011	My Last Day Without You	Christopher Silber (Screenwriter)	Germany
2012	Valley of Saints	Nicholas Bruckman (Producer)	United Kingdom
2012	Indian Summer (Short Film)	Mridu Chandra (Director)	India
2012	Starlet	Radium Cheung (Cinematographer)	Hong Kong
2012	Paraiso (Short Film)	Ronan Landa (Composer)	Israel
2012	Daylight Savings	Goh Nakamura (Actor)	Japan
2012	The Life and Times of Paul the Psychic Octopus	Alexandre O. Philippe (Director)	Switzerland
2013	Mr. Pip	Andrew Adamson (Director)	New Zealand
2013		Harry Gregson-Williams (Composer)	England
2013	Escape from Tomorrow	Soojin Chung (Producer)	South Korea
2013	I Learn America	Jean-Michel Dissard (Director)	France
2013	This is Martin Bonner	Chad Hartigan (Director)	Cyprus
2013	Sake-Bomb	Junya Sakino (Director)	Japan
2014	The Artist	Antoine de Cazotte (Producer)	France
2014	A Girl Walks Home Alone at Night	Ana Lily Amirpour (Director)	United Kingdom
2014	Man from Reno	Ayako Fujitani (Actress)	Japan
2014	Difret	Zeresenay Mehari (Director)	Ethiopia
2014	Nuoc 2030	Minh Nguyen-Võ (Director)	Vietnam
2014	Uzumasa Limelight	Ken Ochiai (Director)	Japan
2014	Mudbloods	Farzad Sangari (Director)	Iran
2015	Camino	Zoë Bell (Actress)	New Zealand
2015	Margarita, with a Straw	Shonali Bose (Director)	India
2015	Yosemite	Gabrielle Demeestere (Director)	France
2015	Spellbound	Alfred Hitchcock (Director)	England
2015	Seoul Searching	Daniel Katz (Cinematographer)	Ireland
2015	Seoul Searching	Benson Lee (Director)	South Korea
2015	People are the Sky	Dai Sil Kim-Gibson (Director)	North Korea
2019	The Perfect Candidate	Haifaa al-Mansour (Director)	Saudi Arabia
2019	Asian in America	Jenny Dorsey (Chef)	China
2019	Go Back to China	Emily Ting (Director)	Taiwan
2019	Lingua Franca	Isabel Sandoval (Director and Actor)	Philippines
2019	37 Seconds	Hikari (Director)	Japan
2020	Shadow in the Cloud	Roseanne Liang (Director)	New Zealand
2020	76 Days	Hao Wu (Director)	China
2020	Death of Nintendo	Valarie Castillo-Martinez (Screenwriter, Producer)	Philippines
2020	First Vote	Yi Chen (Director)	China
2020	Mogul Mowgli	Bassam Tariq (Screenwriter, Director)	Pakistan
2020	Minari	Steven Yeun (Executive Producer, Special Guest)	South Korea
2021	7 Days	Roshan Sethi (Co-writer, Director), Karan Soni (Co-writer, Actor), Geraldine Viswanathan (Actor)	Canada
2021	Americanish	Aizzah Fatima (Co-writer, Actor)	Saudi Arabia
2021	Red Rocket	Shih-Ching Tsou (Producer)	Taiwan
2021	Woodlands Dark and Days Bewitched	Kier-La Janisse (Director)	Canada
2021	Users	Natalia Almada (Director)	Mexico
2022	NAP Feature Filmmaker	Deborah Chow (Director)	Canada
2022	Finding Satoshi	Laurent Barthelemy (Writer, Director)	France
2022	Our Father, the Devil	Ellie Foumbi (Actor, Director)	Cameroon
2022	Land of Gold	Nardeep Khurmi (Writer, Actor, Director)	Switzerland
2022	Whina	Rena Owen (Actor)	Aotearoa
2023	The Accidental Getaway Driver	Sing J. Lee (Director)	United Kingdom
2023	Geoff McFetridge: Drawing a Life	Geoff McFetridge (Subject)	Canada
2023	A Revolution on Canvas	Till Schauder & Sara Nodjoumi (Directors), Nicky Nodjoumi (Subject)	Iran & United Kingdom
2023	Skin of Glass	Denise Zmekhol (Director)	Brazil
2023	AUM: The Cult at the End of the World	Chiaki Yanagimoto	Japan

== See also ==
- East-West Center
- Film festivals in North and Central America
- List of film festivals
- Palace Theater
