= Goh Nakamura =

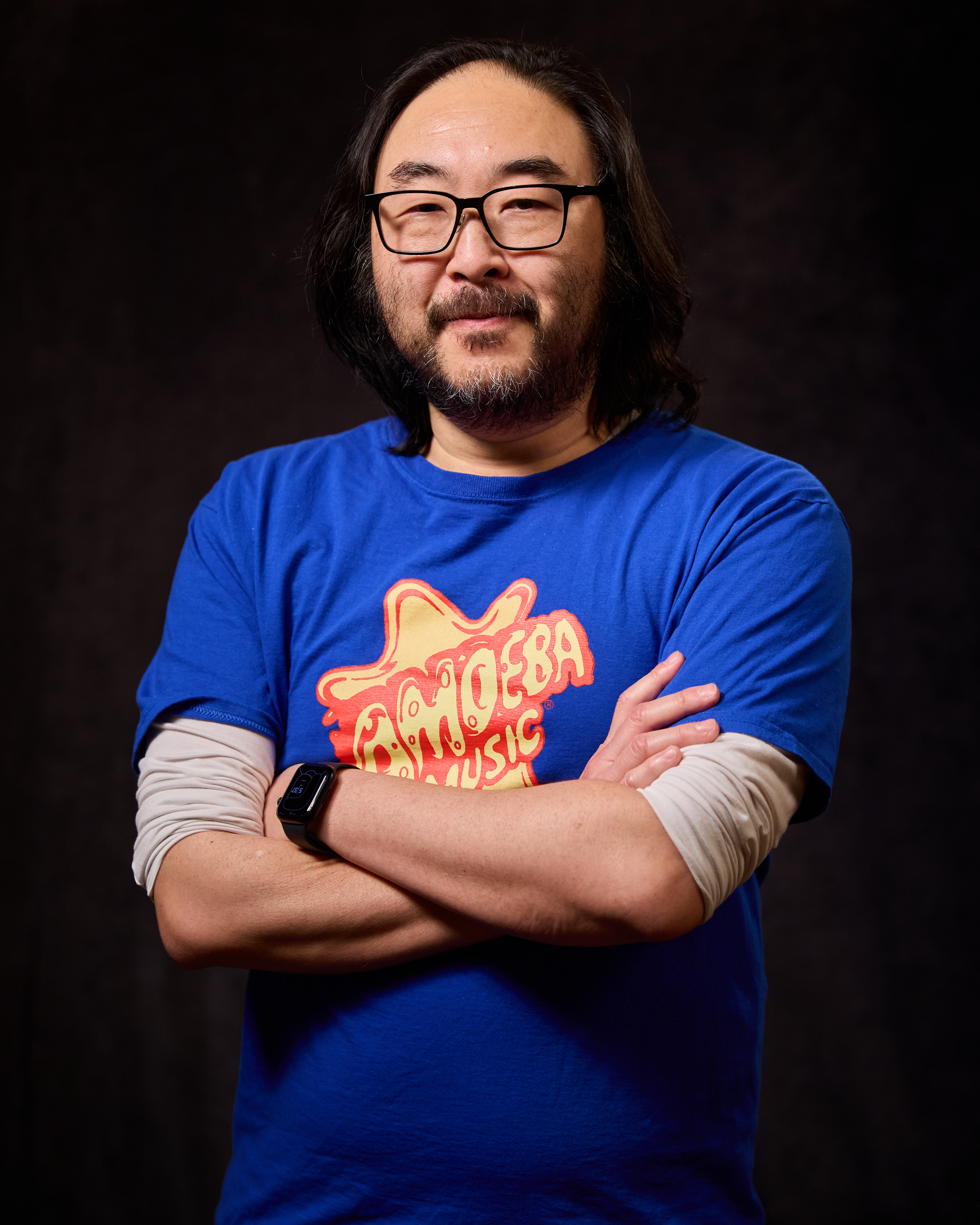
- Nakamura at the 2024 Sundance Film Festival

Background information
- Genres: Acoustic rock, indie pop, folk
- Instrument: Guitar
- Years active: 2007–present
- Website: www.gohnakamura.com

Goh Nakamura is a singer, songwriter, musician, composer and actor. His music has been featured in films directed by Ridley Scott such as A Good Year, American Gangster and Body of Lies. His track "Daylight Savings" also appears in the film Feast of Love. Nakamura made his acting debut in Dave Boyle's award-winning film, Surrogate Valentine, where he played a fictionalized version of himself. The film screened at a number of festivals including the SXSW Film Festival and Nakamura won a Special Jury Prize for Acting from the Dallas International Film Festival for his performance in it. Nakamura is of Japanese American descent.

== Background ==
Nakamura graduated from the Berklee College of Music in the 1990s. Nakamura's influences include Bob Dylan, Elliott Smith and Elvis Costello. His self-described style of "dreamsicle pop" is a combination of folk pop, indie pop, acoustic rock, Beatles music and other influences such as literature.

== Music ==
Nakamura's first album is entitled Daylight Savings. A music video directed by Dino Ignacio for a track on that album entitled "Embarcadero Blues" became featured on the frontpage of YouTube and soon amassed over 1 million views. The title track of the album, "Daylight Savings" was also featured on the soundtrack for the 2007 film Feast of Love, directed by Robert Benton, based on the Charles Baxter novel of the same name and starring Morgan Freeman, Greg Kinnear, Selma Blair and many others.

Nakamura also co-wrote the lyrics for the song "Bird's Eye", performed and also co-written by Mike Patton, Serj Tankian and film composer Marc Streitenfeld, which was a featured song on the original soundtrack for Ridley Scott's 2008 film, Body of Lies. Nakamura has also contributed bass & guitar music to the score of Ridley Scott's American Gangster and also guitar and vocals to the score of another Ridley Scott film, A Good Year.

Nakamura's second album is entitled Ulysses and was considered more of a "branching out" in style that received positive reviews from the likes of KQED. Nakamura's third album is entitled Motion from the Music Picture and features songs from Dave Boyle's films Surrogate Valentine and Daylight Savings.

== Film Acting ==
Nakamura made his acting debut in Dave Boyle's film Surrogate Valentine, where he played a fictionalized version of himself. The film screened at a number of festivals including the 2011 SXSW Film Festival. It won the Grand Jury Prize for Best Narrative Film from the 2011 San Diego Asian Film Festival and won an Audience Award for Best Narrative Film from the 2011 San Francisco International Asian American Film Festival (now known as CAAMFest. For his performance in Surrogate Valentine, Nakamura won a Special Jury Prize for Acting from the Dallas International Film Festival.

He also starred in the film's sequel, Daylight Savings which was named after his first album and which premiered at the 2012 SXSW Film Festival. For his work in both films, Nakamura was chosen as a New American Filmmaker by the Vilcek Foundation at the 2012 Hawaii International Film Festival. The National Film Society (comprising Patrick Epino and Stephen Dypiangco) also awarded him a Best Actor award for his role in Daylight Savings. He played the same role in the third film in the trilogy, I Will Make You Mine (2020), written and directed by Lynn Chen and a selection of the 2020 South By Southwest Film Festival.

Nakamura plays "Uncle" Sam, musician and host of an open mic night, in the award-winning independent film, Life Inside Out (2014) directed by Jill D'Agnenica. He performs his song "Here's a Secret" on stage in the film.
