= Dave Boyle =

American film director

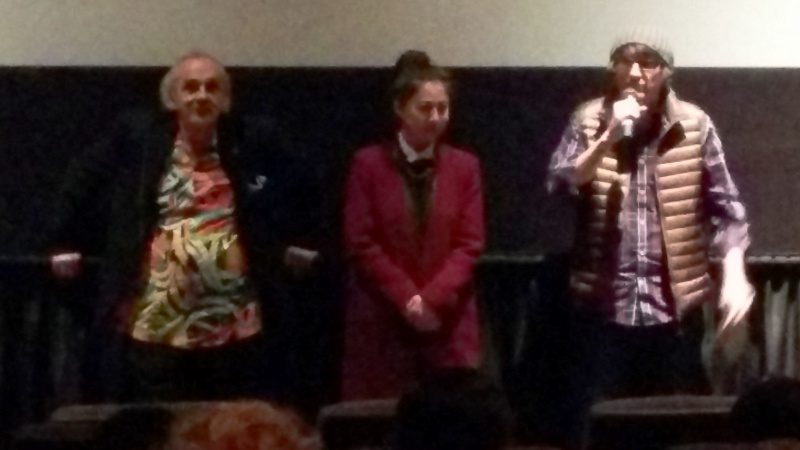
- Boyle (right) with Pepe Serna and Ayako Fujitani
- Born: 1982 (age 43–44)
- Occupations: Filmmaker; editor; actor
- Years active: 2006–present

Dave Boyle (born 1982) is an American filmmaker, editor, and actor. He has written and directed several movies set in Japan, or featuring primarily Japanese or Japanese-American casts, including the feature films Big Dreams Little Tokyo (2006), White on Rice (2009), Surrogate Valentine (2011), Daylight Savings (2012), and Man from Reno (2014), which have won awards at film festivals around the world.

== Early life ==
Boyle studied Japanese at Brigham Young University. He participated in Mormon missionary service in Australia.

== Career ==
=== Big Dreams Little Tokyo ===
Big Dreams Little Tokyo (2006), Boyle's directorial debut, premiered at the AFI Festival in Hollywood, California. Boyle also stars in the film as the character "Boyd." The film also stars James Kyson Lee and Hiroshi Watanabe, who he would later work with on his next film, White on Rice. Boyle also conceived the idea for the film while living in the Japantown area of Sydney, Australia. Many of the characters in the film were based on people he met and interacted with while living there. The film was shot in the summer of 2005 in San Jose and San Francisco, California as well as Salt Lake City, Utah, and the film was produced by Duane Andersen and Megan Boyle.

=== White on Rice ===
White on Rice (2009) was Boyle's second film, which screened at a variety of film festivals and which also won Screenplay Awards at the Los Angeles Asian Pacific Film Festival. The film also stars Hiroshi Watanabe and James Kyson Lee from Big Dreams Little Tokyo as well as Lynn Chen. Actor Justin Kwong in the film also received a Jury Award from the Los Angeles Asian Pacific Film Festival for "Talent to Watch." The film also received an Audience Award at the 2009 San Diego Asian Film Festival. The San Francisco Chronicle's Jeff Yang also called the film "a cinematic milestone."

=== Surrogate Valentine ===
Boyle's third film was Surrogate Valentine (2011), starring indie musician Goh Nakamura, Chadd Stoops, Lynn Chen, Mary Cavett, Joy Osmanski and Parry Shen. It screened at film festivals including SXSW (South by Southwest Film Festival). The film won a Grand Jury Award for Best Narrative Feature at the 2011 San Diego Asian Film Festival. The film also won an Audience Award for Best Narrative Feature at the 2011 San Francisco International Asian American Film Festival, and star Goh Nakamura received a Special Jury Prize from the Dallas International Film Festival for "Special Achievement in Acting."

=== Daylight Savings ===
A 2012 sequel to Surrogate Valentine, Daylight Savings stars Goh Nakamura as well as Yea-Ming Chen, Ayako Fujitani (the daughter of Steven Seagal), Lynn Chen, Michael Aki, Jane Lui, Joy Osmanski and more. The film also screened at the South by Southwest Film Festival (SXSW) as well as a number of other film festivals including the Los Angeles Asian Pacific Film Festival, the San Francisco International Asian American Film Festival and the San Diego Asian Film Festival. The film was also nominated for a Grand Jury Award for Best Narrative Feature at the 2012 Los Angeles Asian Pacific Film Festival.

=== Man from Reno ===
Man from Reno is a neo-noir mystery film set in California's Bay Area that stars Pepe Serna as a small-town sheriff of a town south of San Francisco named Paul Del Moral and Ayako Fujitani as a Japanese crime novelist named Aki who travels to San Francisco to escape press tours on her most recent book. Del Moral investigates the "Running Man" (played by Hiroshi Watanabe from White on Rice), while the title character, Akira (played by Kazuki Kitamura), encounters Aki. A mystery soon unfolds involving Akira, the Running Man, and a number of other diverse characters, including Derrick O'Connor as an elusive wheelchair-using billionaire. The film premiered at the 2014 Los Angeles Film Festival, where it won a Narrative Jury Award for Best Narrative Feature.

== Upcoming projects ==
Other films that Boyle is attached to direct include a Japanese detective story called Komorebi set in Osaka, as well as a film entitled Cover Band written by Matt Warren and David Zarif about a tribute band that goes back in time and end up taking the place of the original band in history.

Boyle is set to direct a currently untitled science fiction horror film for Paramount Pictures. He is also providing rewrites to the script. Boyle is also set to direct a remake of the film Pulse for Screen Gems and Spyglass Media Group.

== Filmography ==
- Big Dreams Little Tokyo (2006) − Writer, Director (also "Boyd")
- White on Rice (2009) − Writer, Director
- Digital Antiquities (2011) − Editor, Post Production Supervisor (Director: J.P. Chan)
- Surrogate Valentine (2011) − Writer, Director, Producer
- Daylight Savings (2012) − Writer, Director, Producer
- Man from Reno (2014) − Writer, Director, Producer
- I Will Make You Mine (2020) − Producer
- Tokyo Cowboy (2023) − Writer
- House of Ninjas (2024) − Writer, Director
- Never After Dark (2026) – Writer, Director

== Awards ==
- Audience Award, Narrative Feature, 2009 San Diego Asian Film Festival, for White on Rice.
- Special Jury Prize, Outstanding Feature Screenplay, 2009 Los Angeles Asian Pacific Film Festival, for White on Rice (shared with Joel Clark)
- Grand Jury Prize, Best Narrative Feature, 2011 San Diego Asian Film Festival, for Surrogate Valentine.
- Audience Award, Best Narrative Feature, 2011 San Francisco International Asian American Film Festival (now CAAMFest), for Surrogate Valentine
- Narrative Jury Award, Best Narrative Feature, 2014 Los Angeles Film Festival, for Man from Reno.
