= I Will Make You Mine =

- Film poster
- Directed by: Lynn Chen
- Written by: Lynn Chen
- Produced by: Dave Boyle; Lynn Chen; Mye Hoang; Cathy Shim; Emily Ting
- Starring: Lynn Chen; Goh Nakamura
- Cinematography: Bill Otto; Carl Nenzen Loven
- Edited by: Abe Forman-Greenwald
- Music by: Goh Nakamura
- Production company: Gray Hat
- Distributed by: Gravitas Ventures
- Release date: May 26, 2020
- Running time: 79 minutes
- Country: United States
- Language: English

I Will Make You Mine is a 2020 American comedy drama film written and directed by Lynn Chen and starring Chen and Goh Nakamura. It is the third film of a trilogy in which Nakamura plays himself following the Dave Boyle films Surrogate Valentine (2011) and Daylight Savings (2012). It is also Chen's feature directorial debut.

== Cast ==
- Lynn Chen as Rachel
- Yea-Ming Chen as Yea-Ming
- Ayako Fujitani as Erika
- Goh Nakamura as Goh
- Joy Osmanski as Amy
- Mike Faiola as Josh
- Tamlyn Tomita as Julia
- Ayami Riley Tomine as Sachiko

== Release ==
In February 2020, it was announced that Gravitas Ventures acquired distribution rights to the film, which was released on May 26, 2020. It was released on VOD on May 29, 2020.

== Reception ==
The film has a 100% rating on Rotten Tomatoes based on 21 reviews. Bobby LePire of Film Threat rated the film a 6 out of 10. David Ehrlich of IndieWire graded the film a B. Ty Burr of The Boston Globe awarded the film two and a half stars.

Kevin Crust of the Los Angeles Times gave the film a positive review and wrote, "More evolution than sequel, Chen‘s chapter maintains the laidback, low-fi charm and black-and-white aesthetic infused with Nakamura’s dreamy, pensive music but also grows the characters, infusing them with more narrative purpose."

Lisa Kennedy of Variety gave the film a positive review, calling it "a female-forward work with three generously drawn roles for Asian women actors."

Jeannette Catsoulis of The New York Times gave the film a positive review and wrote, "Soft black-and-white cinematography (by Bill Otto and Carl Nenzen Loven) and low-key humor help offset the limitations of its partly crowd-funded budget, as does the naturalism of the partly improvised performances."

John DeFore of The Hollywood Reporter gave the film a positive review, calling it "A beautifully shot, settled-down finale."
