= Pepe Serna =

American actor

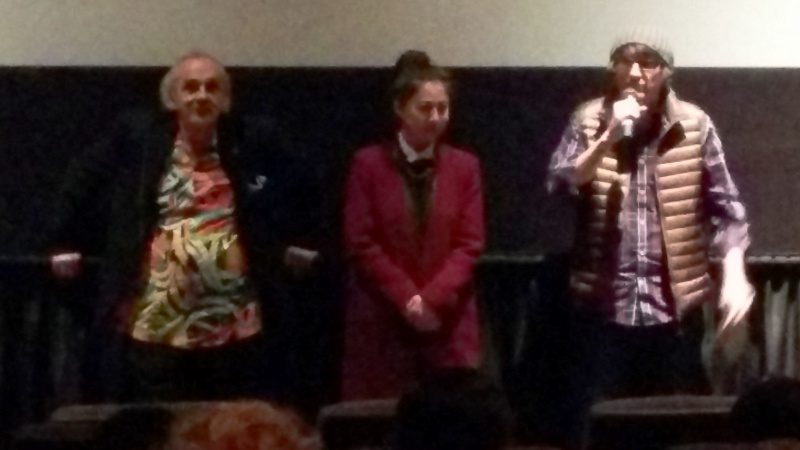
- Serna (left) with Ayako Fujitani and Dave Boyle in 2015
- Born: July 23, 1944 (age 82); Corpus Christi, Texas, U.S.
- Occupations: Actor; artist
- Years active: 1970–present
- Spouse: Diane Serna (m. 1969)

Pepe Serna (born July 23, 1944) is an American actor and artist.

== Career ==
Serna's first break in films came in 1970 on the Roger Corman-directed film The Student Nurses. Serna has also appeared in such films as The Jerk (1979), Scarface (1983) directed by Brian De Palma and The Adventures of Buckaroo Banzai Across the 8th Dimension (1984). Serna acted in the film Aguruphobia, which he also co-produced. He has also appeared on stage, including his solo show El Ruco, Chuco, Cholo, Pachuco. He also played Señor Cárdenas in the film Downsizing (2007).

Serna has been honored by the Screen Actors Guild Heritage Achievement Award; the League of United Latin American Citizens, and the Estrella Award for Arts & Culture from the Orange County Hispanic Chamber of Commerce.

== Personal life ==
Serna is of Mexican heritage.

== Filmography ==
=== Television ===
Year	Title	Role	Notes
1973	Miracle on 34th Street	Y Leader	Television film
1974	The Last Angry Man	Charlie Parelli	Television film
1974	The Gun	Natcho	Television film
1975	The Desperate Miles	Ruiz	Television film
1975	The Deadly Tower	Mano	Television film
1975	Adam-12	Roger Foster	Episode: "Operation Action"
1976	The Rockford Files	Ray Ochoa	Episode: "The Oracle Wore a Cashmere Suit"
1977	Tarantulas: The Deadly Cargo	Illegal Immigrant	Television film; uncredited
1978	The Paper Chase	Luis Sanchez	Episode: "Voices of Silence"
1979	The Streets of L.A.	Sergeant Castro	Television film
1980	City in Fear	Raymond Zavala	Television film
1981	Three Hundred Miles for Stephanie	Bobby Hernandez	Television film
1981	The Monkey Mission	Vito	Television film
1982, 1992	American Playhouse	Manuel Flores, Romaldo Cortez, Marpo	3 episodes
1983	Sadat	Atef Sadat	Television film
1983	White Water Rebels	Harry Cutter	Television film
1984	T. J. Hooker	Frank Fierro	Episode: "The Snow Game"
1984	Best Kept Secrets	Jim Ramos	Television film
1985	Knight Rider	Lupo	Episode: "Knight Sting"
1985	Streets of Justice	Detective Almos	Television film
1986–1987	Miami Vice	Zabado, Oswaldo Guzman	3 Episodes
1987	The Three Kings	Alex Sweetwood	Television film
1988	Hunter	Roberto Sanchez	Episode: "Renegade"
1988	The Fortunate Pilgrim	John Colluci	3 episodes
1988	Break of Dawn	Hector	Television film
1989	The Forgotten	Pepe Guitierrez	Television film
1991	Conagher	Casuse	Television film
1993–1994	Second Chances	Salvador Lopez	6 episodes
1995	Diagnosis: Murder	Captain Collins	Episode: "A Blast from the Past"
1999–2000	The PJs	Emilio Sanchez (voice)	42 episodes
2000	The Princess & the Barrio Boy	Bum	Television film
2001	The Zeta Project	Stevedore (voice)	Episode: "The Next Gen"
2003	Kingpin	Jorge Romo	3 episodes
2003	Justice League	Shifflet (voice)	Episode: "Hearts and Minds"

=== Film ===
Year	Title	Role	Notes
1970	The Student Nurses	Luis	
1971	Red Sky at Morning	Chango Lopez	
1971	Johnny Got His Gun	Jose	Uncredited
1971	Shoot Out	Pepe	
1972	The New Centurions	Mexican Man	
1973	Group Marriage	Ramon	
1974	Hangup	Enrique	
1975	The Day of the Locust	Miguel	
1976	Swashbuckler	Street Entertainer	
1976	The Killer Inside Me	Johnny Lopez	
1976	Car Wash	Chuco	
1978	Roots of Blood	Juan	
1979	A Force of One	Orlando	
1979	Walk Proud	Cesar	
1979	The Jerk	Punk #1	
1980	Honeysuckle Rose	Rooster	
1980	Inside Moves	Herrada	
1982	Vice Squad	Pete Mendez	
1983	Heartbreaker	Loco	
1983	Deal of the Century	Vardis	
1983	Scarface	Angel Fernandez	
1984	The Adventures of Buckaroo Banzai Across the 8th Dimension	Reno Nevada	
1984	Red Dawn	Mr. Mondragón	
1985	Fandango	Gas Station Mechanic	
1985	Silverado	Scruffy	
1986	Out of Bounds	Murano	
1988	Caddyshack II	Carlos	
1990	Bad Jim	Virgilio Segura	
1990	Postcards from the Edge	Raoul	
1990	The Rookie	Raymond Garcia	
1992	American Me	Mundo	
1992	Only You	Dock Official	
1994	A Million to Juan	Mr. Ortiz	
1995	In the Flesh	Harlan Ramirez	
1996	Land of Milk and Honey	Danny	
1997	The Brave	Alessandro	
2000	Luminarias	Rick	
2000	Bread and Roses	Restaurateur	
2000	Picking Up the Pieces	Florencio	
2000	Along for the Ride	Dr. Sanchez	
2000	Rapid Transit	Herman Ortiz	
2002	You Got Nothin'	Carlos	
2003	Deadly Swarm	Commandante Alvarez	
2003	Exposed	Raoul	
2003	Devil's Knight	Hector Rivera	
2004	Latin Dragon	Hector Sanchez	
2006	The Virgin of Juarez	Eduardo Morales	
2006	The Black Dahlia	Tomas Dos Santos	
2006	Big Dreams Little Tokyo	Mr. Gonzalez	
2008	Moe	Older Man	
2009	White on Rice	Professor Berk	
2014	Man from Reno	Paul Del Moral	
2014	Cake	Nuncio	
2015	Ana Maria in Novela Land	Father Miguel	
2015	Kill or Be Killed	Rudy Goebel	
2015	Road to Juarez	Fortunato	
2015	Aguruphobia	Nanak	
2016	Restored Me	Manny	
2016	Gino's Wife	Gino	
2016	Monday Nights at Seven	Paul	
2016	Superpowerless	George Holst	
2017	Downsizing	Señor Cárdenas	
2023	Flamin' Hot	Abuelito	
