= Saving Face (2004 film) =

2004 film by Alice Wu

- Saving Face film poster
- Directed by: Alice Wu
- Written by: Alice Wu
- Produced by: Will Smith; James Lassiter; Teddy Zee
- Starring: Michelle Krusiec; Joan Chen; Lynn Chen
- Cinematography: Harlan Bosmajian
- Edited by: Susan Graef; Sabine Hoffmann
- Music by: Anton Sanko
- Production companies: Destination Films; Overbrook Entertainment; Forensic Films; GreeneStreet Films
- Distributed by: Sony Pictures Classics
- Release dates: September 12, 2004 (TIFF); May 27, 2005 (U.S.)
- Running time: 91 minutes
- Country: United States
- Languages: English; Mandarin; Shanghainese

Saving Face is a 2004 American romantic comedy-drama film directed by Alice Wu, in her feature-length debut. The film focuses on Wilhelmina, a young Chinese American surgeon; her unwed, pregnant mother; and her dancer girlfriend. It was the first Hollywood movie that centered on Chinese Americans since The Joy Luck Club (1993).

The name itself is a reference to the pan-East Asian social concept of face. Saving Face premiered at the Toronto International Film Festival on September 12, 2004 and was released by Sony Pictures Classics on May 27, 2005 in the United States and received mostly positive reviews from critics.

== Plot ==
Dr. Wilhelmina "Wil" Pang is a successful young American surgeon living in New York City. Wil is a lesbian but is closeted to her mother Hwei-Lan and her mother's friends. Wil is forced by her mother to come to a gathering at the restaurant Planet China with family friends where her mother has plans to set her up with a son of a friend, but Wil is drawn to Vivian, the daughter of one of the Chinese mothers who recently got a divorce. They run into each other at the hospital where Wil works, only to discover that Vivian's father is Wil's boss, Dr. Shing. Vivian and her father have a tense relationship since Vivian is currently pursuing her love of modern dance instead of the more respectable ballet.

Wil comes home to discover her mother has been kicked out by her grandfather for being pregnant out of wedlock, bringing shame to the family. Wil asks for the identity of the father, but Hwei-Lan refuses to answer. From then on, Hwei-Lan lives with Wil.

Vivian invites Wil to one of her dance shows and after the show, the two hang out. Vivian reveals the fact that they had met once before when they were children; Vivian kissed Wil on the nose after Wil rescued her from bullies; Wil ran away afterward. Vivian and Wil go to Vivian's apartment and the two kiss. The couple goes on several dates, but Wil is afraid of kissing Vivian in public. At Vivian's request, Wil presents Vivian to her mother as a friend so that they can meet and the three share an awkward dinner. It is revealed later that her mother knows of her homosexuality, but is in denial.

Set up by Wil, Hwei-Lan goes on several dates to find a man to be a father to her unborn child, but remains unattached. She debates on whether to accept the affections of Cho, a man who has loved her for 15 years and is willing to parent her child.

Vivian reveals to Wil that she was accepted into a prestigious ballet program in Paris and is considering the offer. Wil congratulates Vivian and gives her encouragement to accept the offer. While Vivian still debates on the offer, Vivian's father speaks to Wil and presses her to convince Vivian to accept the offer. Wil withdraws from Vivian, and Vivian accepts the job in Paris.

After Wil’s grandmother passes away unexpectedly, Hwei-Lan accepts Cho's marriage proposal. At the wedding, Wil interrupts with a love note from the father of the child saying how much he loves her and wants to marry her despite their age gap. Wil points out the elderly pharmacist, Old Yu, as the man she loves. Old Yu protests, and Little Yu, his son, stands up and announces that he is the one. Wil and her mother run out of the wedding and onto a bus, laughing. After an emotional talk with her mother, Wil rushes to the airport to catch Vivian. Wil apologizes, but Vivian challenges Wil to kiss her to prove her sincerity. Unable to publicly display her love out of fear, Wil is left at the terminal as Vivian leaves for Paris.

Three months later, Wil goes to another party at Planet China, where Hwei-Lan and Little Yu are now a couple. Wil sees Vivian, who has come to see her mother. Wil approaches Vivian and asks her to dance. They dance and kiss. Hwei-Lan and Vivian's mother smile at each other while giving a thumbs up. Some people leave in disgust, but Wil and Vivian ignore them, while everyone else joins in to dance.

In between credits, Hwei-Lan has Wil and Vivian (now engaged), family and friends over at her apartment for a function. Hwei-Lan asks Wil about having babies, to which she reacts with a spit take.

== Cast ==
- Michelle Krusiec as Wilhelmina Pang
- Lynn Chen as Vivian Shing
- Joan Chen as Hwei-Lan Gao (Mother/Ma)
- Jin Wang as "Wai Gung" (Grandfather)
- Guang Lan Koh as "Wai Po" (Grandmother)
- Jessica Hecht as Randi
- Ato Essandoh as Jay
- Wang Luoyong as Dr. Shing
- David Shih as Norman
- Brian Yang as Yu
- Nathaniel Geng as Stimson Cho
- Mao Zhao as Old Yu

== Production ==
=== Origins ===
Alice Wu, who directed the movie, wrote the script several years earlier while working as a program manager at Cinemania and Music Central, Microsoft's CD-ROM entertainment department. She originally started writing a novel inspired by her experience coming out as a lesbian to her middle-aged mother. Wu came out to her mother in her last year of college and remembered her reaction as “she basically said, 'I don't think you're gay, and I never want to see you again.' We didn't talk for two years. But I never doubted her love for me. It had everything to do with her willingness to make changes in her own life to be happy." Later, Wu and her mother grew very close, resulting in Wu dedicating Saving Face to her mother because “[she] wanted her [mother] to know it’s not too late to fall in love for the first time. [Wu] want[ed] her to leave the theater feeling that sense of hope.” She has also explained that although she has a lot in common with Wil, the situation of the film is not based on her life. Alice Wu later realized that her novel would be a better fit for a movie and drafted the first script in three days during a 12-week screen writing class at the University of Washington. As advised by her instructor, Wu gave herself five years to make the movie, quitting her Microsoft job, moving to New York, and taking a filmmaking class taught by Alan Oxman.

=== Development ===
In 2002, Wu submitted her script for Saving Face to a contest sponsored by the Coalition of Asian Pacifics in Entertainment and won. It was there that she met Teddy Zee, the president of Will Smith’s production company, Overbook Entertainment. Zee described the process as "an awakening for me about the Asian American experience in Hollywood, because I was always such a part of the studio system. Every day there are actors coming in who are Chinese American, who don't get an opportunity except to play prostitutes or waiters."

As a first-time director and writer, Wu faced many challenges in maintaining her vision of the film. Studios that saw potential in her script wanted to make it like My Big Fat Greek Wedding. She was asked to make the characters white so that they could cast Reese Witherspoon as Wil and Ellen Burstyn as her mother. The studio then tried to compromise and asked to make the love interest white so that a star like Scarlett Johansson could bring more attention to the film. Despite further proposals for script changes, Wu maintained that the Mandarin dialogue, lesbian romance, and her involvement as both writer and director were non-negotiable.

=== Casting ===
Alice Wu described the casting process as “a challenge” due to her difficulty in finding Mandarin-speaking actors. She felt the film needed to be bilingual in order to make it authentic and believable and thus met with over one thousand actors before finding the right cast. Wu also experienced an issue in casting one of the main roles because the actor was stuck in China due to visa problems; therefore, she had to use her second choice, who was in the United States.

Saving Face was Lynn Chen's first feature film and Michelle Krusiec's first lead role.

At her first audition, Lynn Chen played Vivian simply as a friend of Wil's in the vending machine scene because she did not have access to the script and was therefore unaware that it was a lesbian romantic comedy. She returned to audition four more times, once with Michelle Krusiec before securing the role of Vivian Shing.

Because she was not a native Mandarin speaker and the film required natural comedic timing, Wu allowed Krusiec's character to respond to her mother's Mandarin in English, which the director-writer said “is a very first-generation-American thing to do”. Wil was made to only speak in Mandarin “when she wants to elicit a response from her mother”. Before production began, Michelle Krusiec was flown out to Taiwan for three months to take an immersive Mandarin course.

=== Filming ===
Filming began in fall 2003 on the $2.5 million project. Saving Face was filmed on location in New York’s Flushing, Queens, Brooklyn, and Manhattan on 35 mm film. Featuring the New York City Chinese American community, the film features in a mixture of Mandarin Chinese and English.

The production team came across budgetary issues when Wu insisted that they include landscape shots of New York to ground the film in its environment. With little money left, the team was able to film in a helicopter that was being used to get aerial shots of Manhattan for the movie Hitch.

== Release ==
Saving Face premiered at the Toronto International Film Festival on 12 September 2004, and made its way around the independent film circuit, screening at Sundance Film Festival, Seattle International Film Festival. It was chosen as the opening night film in 2005 for the Florida Film Festival. The film was subsequently bought by Sony Pictures Entertainment and initially planned for release through their midbudget division Screen Gems before going into limited release in the US through arthouse division Sony Pictures Classics on May 27, 2005.

=== Box office ===
Saving Face initially opened at only 6 theaters, making $75,104 (averaging $12,517/theater) in its opening weekend, and went on to gross $1,187,266 from 56 theaters in its theatrical run. It grossed an additional $49,252 in the UK, for a worldwide gross of $1,236,518.

=== Critical reception ===
The critical reaction to the movie was mostly positive, with most critics praising the tender romance and the light-hearted comedy, although some critics lambasted it for a lack of depth and a "soap opera-like" ending.

Stephen Holden of The New York Times, Wesley Morris of the Boston Globe, Ed Park of Village Voice, among others, gave positive reviews, with Holden in particular calling it an 'amiable' romance spanning three generations of Chinese Americans. Holden's overall positive review noted that the film had failings at the end: "Sadly, as "Saving Face" ties up the strands of its story, it forfeits its credibility at a wedding finale with a series of instant feel-good solutions and reconciliations."

Owen Gleiberman of Entertainment Weekly praised the movie’s interesting storyline and twists but stated that “the writer-director, Alice Wu, fudges a lot of the basics — I never believed the heroine was really a physician”.

David Rooney of Variety Media said that the film excelled at “spanning the fragile bridge between traditional values and independent spirit” and providing “gentle humor and [a] universal emotional experience”. However, despite the “satisfying payoff” he also criticized the film for its predictability, pacing, and momentum.

Jonathan Rosenbaum of the Chicago Reader was notably critical of the film, especially the latter half, describing it as collapsing into "nonsense".

Autostraddle ranked the film #2 of the best 200 Lesbian Movies of All Time.

On Rotten Tomatoes the film holds an 88% approval rating based on reviews from 89 critics, with an average rating of 6.70/10. The site's consensus describes it as "A charming tale of a love affair that overcomes cultural taboos". On Metacritic it has a score of 65 out of 100 based on 28 reviews.

=== Awards ===
Saving Face was nominated for the Breakthrough Director Award at the 2005 Gotham Awards, the Viewer's Choice Award and the Best Actress Award for Michelle Krusiec at the 2005 Golden Horse Film Festival, and the GLAAD Media Award for Outstanding Film in Limited Release at the 2006 GLAAD Media Awards. Out of these, it won the Viewer's Choice Award at the 2005 Golden Horse Film Festival.

Michelle Krusiec explained that the Golden Horse nomination enabled her to begin perceiving the Asian and Asian American communities as a legitimate audience, leading her to pursue roles that targeted both groups.

At the 2006 Asian Excellence Awards, Lynn Chen won the Outstanding Newcomer Award. Alice Wu also won the Visionary Award at the San Diego Asian Film Festival and the Audience Award for Best Narrative at the San Francisco International Asian American Film Festival in 2005.

== Themes ==
=== Character development ===
Saving Face centralizes the relationships between women and their perspectives, mainly that of Vivian and Wil and Wil’s Ma. At the start of the movie, Wil is guarded, focused on work and juggling her life as a lesbian in the city and a dutiful daughter in the Chinese community in Flushing, Queens. Vivian acts as a link between Wil's two worlds (the city and Flushing). By falling in love with Wil and wanting her to be open about their relationship, Vivian gave her the confidence to come out to her mother and her community. Eventually, Wil is able to come out which allows for her to start living her life as her true life which also inspires her to stop her mother's unwanted wedding, giving her the same gift of freedom.

Ma's character starts as being dependent, not open about her feelings and willing to marry a man only to restore her father's honour. After being banished from Flushing for her scandalous pregnancy, she is able to deepen her relationship with Wil while simultaneously becoming more independent and in tune with her own feelings. Furthermore, the film briefly addresses the issue of anti-Black racism in Asian communities when Ma insisted that Jay, Wil's African American neighbour use paper plates because it is "safer." However, as the movie progresses, Ma becomes close friends with Jay, demonstrating her ability to change her traditional views.

The evolution of the importance of saving face is also intertwined with the character development of Wil and Ma since as they become more empowered and sexually liberated, they begin to care less about saving face, implying the possibility of change in traditional Chinese family ethics. The ending scene of the movie included Ma, Wil, and Vivian as a way to indicate Wil's development where all aspects of her life have now become interconnected. The end is also a result of the relationships between these three women, further demonstrating the importance of their relationships in achieving "personhood and…empowerment…The progressive liberating process of coming out of the closet embraced by Ma and Wil in the end also invokes cultural change in the Chinese American community."

=== The concept of face ===
Like the title suggests, one of Saving Face’s major themes is the concept of face, a value central to many Chinese families where family members are “expected to perform his or her role properly to maintain the family reputation …and [is] strongly monitored by the community.” The very first scene in the film, Wil is wearing a face mask, indicating that she is hiding and not being her true self. When Ma shows up to Wil's apartment with her face covered by sunglasses, it is a physical manifestation of her father and her own loss of face since she has been banished from Flushing for being pregnant outside of wedlock.

The concept of face is especially clear during the climactic scene of the film: when Wil comes out to her mother by saying “I love you…and I’m…gay”. When Ma responds by saying “How can you say you love me, and throw that in my face?”, face has a double meaning. Wil's mother sees the impossibility of accepting her daughter's sexuality because she believes it is based on a “bad ideology” on top of it negatively affecting her reputation (face). In this way, the closet serves as a way to reinforce the concept of face because it is used to hide Wil's sexuality and in the same vein, Ma's pregnancy. Consequently, both characters perform normative forms of heterosexuality in order to hide these realities that are perceived as shameful by their community.

=== Stereotypical representation ===
This film has also been interpreted as an example of the blurring between mainstream and marginal representations of Chinese Americans in film. Wu uses stereotypes to establish a “Chinese authenticity” for the characters while also subverting others in important ways. As an intelligent surgeon, Wil is an example of the model minority while her mother is “germ-obsessed…and [a] meddling matchmaker”. Elders are generally shown to be maintainers of tradition who pressure their children to integrate. For instance, Wil's grandfather practices tai chi while Old Yu tells fortunes. Saving Face references mainstream Chinese American movies such as The Joy Luck Club and Maid in Manhattan in the scene when Ma goes to the video store. There, she examines porn movies that stereotype Asian women as docile, the “China Doll” and “Dragon lady” who are all sexual objects for the Western white male gaze. By combining these stereotypes with ironic comments, consumption of porn meant for men, a homosexual storyline and characters, Wu questions these stereotypes.

=== The fluidity of identity and tradition ===
==== Complex identities ====
Saving Face explores the experiences of being marginalized within an ethnic community and addressing “the multiple layers of minority status by examining intersections of gender, ethnicity, and sexual orientation”. The complexities and contradictions of these experiences are displayed using the changing identities of Wil and her mother as well as their defiance of norms. Throughout most of the film, Wil's mother is both constrained by traditional Chinese values and the enforcer of these values. She decides to marry a man that she does not love in order to please her father and regain her family's honour while also setting Wil up with men even though she already knew that she was interested in women. Moreover, Ma's character defies norms despite this emphasis on filial piety: she is autonomous as she is pregnant, explores the city alone, and rents a porn DVD. These contradictions demonstrate Ma's flexibility, negotiation, and social construction of her values.

==== Incompatibility of homosexuality and traditional Chinese values ====
This film's dealing with the topic of the incompatibility of homosexuality with Chinese traditions and its evolution throughout demonstrate the fluidity of these traditions in accommodating new realities. Homosexuality is seen as a threat in traditional Chinese families because they threaten “filial piety, family continuity and family reputation” and is seen as linked to failed education and Americanization. The heteronormativity of the Chinese Flushing community is first displayed during the first dance hall scene when the shots alternate between those of men and women. These shots represent accepted heteronormative binary that places men and women on opposite sides.

Wil's mother's refusal to accept Wil's lesbianism despite having walked in on her with a woman demonstrates this incompatibility as she continues to set Wil up with men. The incompatibility of gay and Asian identities was also exemplified in Wil's coming out scene when Ma says “I am not a bad mother. My daughter is not gay”, relating homosexuality to a “bad ideology” that could not have come from Ma's traditional Chinese teachings and must therefore originate in Wil's Americanization. When Vivian and Wil break up near the end of the film, it seems as though these two identities are truly irreconcilable.

Yet at the end of the movie, this dichotomy between men and women at the dancehall is no longer present, and Wil and Vivian's kiss symbolize the breaking of this binary. While some of the partygoers leave, rejecting the inclusion of homosexual people in their community, others stay, including Wil's mother and grandfather. The happy ending shows that even though Chinese families are seen as traditional and static, they can transform to accept homosexuality.

== Impact and legacy ==
In an interview with Asians on Film, Michelle Krusiec mentioned that although Saving Face did not make a dramatic impact on Hollywood through the box office, the film has remained relevant through its staying power. Saving Face has continued to be screened at festivals such as at the San Diego Asian Film Festival in 2019 and at the 30th annual San Francisco International Asian American Film Festival in 2012.

Looking back on the film at the eight-year anniversary reunion and press conference, Joan Chen, Michelle Krusiec, and Lynn Chen recalled that the movie was a special project that they continue to treasure. On this topic, Joan Chen said “I was always this tragic woman, and Alice gave me this opportunity to play in a comedy. In a lot of the movies that I did, before Saving Face, I had a dark period where I played a lot of awful roles in films like On Deadly Ground and Judge Dredd … But I really felt I wasn’t being authentic, and so Saving Face came along and gave me the opportunity to get the authenticity that I was craving for.” Similarly, Krusiec was appreciative of her role as a “fulfilling” opportunity to show “real depth” in a central role where she could develop her character. Lynn Chen also praised Alice Wu for her skill at directing and commanding the set and realized that she has not had as much of a special opportunity since filming Saving Face.

At the Saving Face reunion panel at Clexacon in 2017, Krusiec commented on the power of the movie, being one of the few lesbian movies with a happy ending. She explained that this film remains important because many viewers have told her that it has made them feel represented to the point where they were able to come out.

In an episode of Drunk Lesbians Watch posted in 2018 to YouTube, Michelle Krusiec and Lynn Chen appeared with the hosts and commented on specific scenes from the film, explaining the motivations and emotions of their characters in the scenes.

== See also ==
- List of LGBT films directed by women
- List of lesbian filmmakers
