= Goya Robles =

American actor and poet

- Born: Connecticut, U.S.
- Education: University of Bridgeport; Pace University (MFA)
- Occupations: Actor; poet
- Years active: 2010–present

Goya Robles is an American actor and poet. He is best known for playing Yago as a main cast member across all three seasons of the Epix crime comedy series Get Shorty (2017–2019). He has since had recurring and guest roles in Power Book III: Raising Kanan (2021–2025), the Netflix miniseries Griselda (2024), and the CBS drama CIA (2026), and starred as Javier in the film Tokyo Cowboy (2024).

== Early life and education ==
Robles was born in Connecticut into a family of Puerto Rican and Ecuadorian descent. He studied music at the University of Bridgeport and earned a Master of Fine Arts from the Actors Studio Drama School at Pace University in New York City. He became a lifetime member of the Actors Studio in 2010.

== Career ==
Robles made his screen debut in the 2010 short film Utopia Lies at the Horizon. He went on to appear in independent films, including the crime drama 11:55 (2016), in which he played Teyo alongside John Leguizamo, Julia Stiles and David Zayas.

In 2016, Robles was cast as Yago, a member of a Nevada crime ring, in the Epix series Get Shorty, an adaptation of the Elmore Leonard novel co-starring Chris O'Dowd and Ray Romano. He remained a main cast member for all three seasons, through the show's conclusion in 2019.

Robles played Joaquin Lara, a drug connection to the Thomas family, in a recurring role on the Starz series Power Book III: Raising Kanan across its first four seasons (2021–2025). In 2022 he appeared as Almeida in the Apple TV+ war comedy-drama The Greatest Beer Run Ever, directed by Peter Farrelly and starring Zac Efron and Russell Crowe. He also guest-starred as Oscar Papa in the NBC series Law & Order: Special Victims Unit and Law & Order: Organized Crime in 2023.

In 2024, Robles played Ricardo "Monkey" Morales Navarrete in the Netflix miniseries Griselda, starring Sofía Vergara. The same year he played Javier, an ex-rodeo ranch hand, in the independent comedy-drama Tokyo Cowboy, which premiered at the 2023 Tallgrass Film Festival and received a US theatrical release on August 30, 2024. Reviewers singled out his performance: Film Threat noted that the film centers on the friendship between his character and the protagonist, and The Asian Cut described his Javier as the rancher who teaches the lead to "meet them halfway".

In 2026, Robles guest-starred as Luis Zamora in the episode "Rare Earth" of the CBS and Paramount+ espionage drama CIA, created by Dick Wolf.

Robles executive produced the short film Wonder (2019), which screened at festivals including the Martha's Vineyard African American Film Festival and Outfest.

== Other work ==
Robles is a poet and has taught slam poetry on the faculty of the Lee Strasberg Theatre & Film Institute. He is the founder of Paint The Mic, a spoken-word and visual-arts initiative. His stage credits include the role of Jackie in the Actors Studio production of The Motherfucker with the Hat in Los Angeles and off-Broadway roles in Extremities and Crystal Clear.

== Filmography ==
=== Film ===
Year	Title	Role	Notes
2010	Utopia Lies at the Horizon		Short film
2016	11:55	Teyo	
2019	Wonder		Short film; executive producer
2022	The Greatest Beer Run Ever	Almeida	
2024	Tokyo Cowboy	Javier	

=== Television ===
Year	Title	Role	Notes
2013	The Mentalist	Franklin Morales	Episode: "My Blue Heaven"
2017–2019	Get Shorty	Yago	Main cast
2021–2025	Power Book III: Raising Kanan	Joaquin Lara	Recurring; 9 episodes
2022	NCIS: Los Angeles	Miguel Flores	Episode: "Live Free or Die Standing"
2023	Law & Order: Special Victims Unit	Oscar Papa	2 episodes
2023	Law & Order: Organized Crime	Oscar Papa	Episode: "Shadowërk"
2024	Griselda	Ricardo "Monkey" Morales Navarrete	Episode: "Middle Management"
2026	CIA	Luis Zamora	Episode: "Rare Earth"
