= Save Me (American TV series) =

- Genre: Sitcom
- Created by: John Scott Shepherd
- Starring: Anne Heche; Michael Landes; Alexandra Breckenridge; Madison Davenport; Heather Burns; Joy Osmanski
- Narrated by: Anne Heche
- Composer: Danny Lux
- Country of origin: United States
- Original language: English
- No. of seasons: 1
- No. of episodes: 13 (6 unaired)

Production
- Executive producers: Vivian Cannon; Neal H. Moritz; John Scott Shepherd; Scott Winant; Alexa Junge; Darlene Hunt
- Producers: Joanne Toll; Anne Heche; Andrea P. Stilgenbauer
- Editors: Gregg Featherman; Elba Sanchez-Short; Tara Timpone; Dan Schalk (pilot only)
- Camera setup: Single-camera
- Running time: 30 minutes
- Production companies: JSS Entertainment; Original Film; Sony Pictures Television

Original release
- Network: NBC
- Release: May 23 – June 13, 2013

Save Me is an American sitcom television series starring Anne Heche as Beth Harper, a woman who, after nearly choking to death on a sandwich, becomes a direct pipeline to God. NBC placed a 13-episode series order in May 2012. It debuted on Thursday, May 23, 2013, at 8:00 p.m. Eastern/7:00 p.m. Central and ended on June 13, 2013, after the seventh episode.

== Cast ==
=== Main ===
- Anne Heche as Beth Harper
- Michael Landes as Tom Harper, Beth's husband
- Alexandra Breckenridge as Carly Brugano
- Madison Davenport as Emily Harper, Beth & Tom's daughter
- Heather Burns as Jenna Derring
- Joy Osmanski as Maggie Tompkins

=== Recurring ===
- Diedrich Bader as Elliot Tompkins, Maggie's husband
- Stephen Schneider as Pete Dennings

== Episodes ==
No.	Title	Directed by	Written by	Original release date	Prod. code	US viewers (millions)
1	"The Book of Beth"	Scott Winant	John Scott Shepherd	May 23, 2013	100	3.18
2	"Clutter and Mud"	TBD	TBD	UNAIRED	101	TBD
3	"Angels"	TBD	TBD	UNAIRED	102	TBD
4	"Ghosts"	TBD	TBD	UNAIRED	103	TBD
5	"Demons"	TBD	TBD	UNAIRED	104	TBD
6	"God Only Knows What's Gotten Into Her"	TBD	TBD	UNAIRED	105	TBD
7	"Rest In Peace"	TBD	TBD	UNAIRED	106	TBD
8	"Take It Back"	Scott Winant	Darlene Hunt	May 23, 2013	107	2.93
9	"WWJD"	Wendey Stanzler	Andy Bobrow	May 30, 2013	108	2.66
10	"Heal Thee"	Randy Zisk	Mark Driscoll	May 30, 2013	109	2.66
11	"Whatever the Weather"	Jann Turner	Nancy Fichman & Jennifer Hoppe-House & Anthony King	June 6, 2013	110	3.12
12	"Heavenly Hostess"	Michael McDonald	Steve Baldikoski & Bryan Behar	June 6, 2013	111	2.76
13	"Holier Than Thou"	Scott Winant	Raphael Bob-Waksberg & Joanna Calo & Julie Durk	June 13, 2013	112	2.15

== Controversy ==
Censorship advocacy group One Million Moms (part of the American Family Association) complained about Save Me's content in June 2013, accusing it of being anti-Christian, while focusing its complaints on the character of Beth. The group urged others to protest to NBC to cancel the show.
