= Joy Osmanski =

American actress (born 1975)

- Born: October 29, 1975 (age 50); Seoul, South Korea
- Education: Principia College (BA); University of California, San Diego (MFA)
- Occupation: Actress
- Years active: 2006–present

Joy Osmanski (born October 29, 1975) is an American actress. She is best known for her wide range of comedic roles on the TV shows The Loop, Samantha Who?, True Jackson, VP and Devious Maids. Joy is also known for her recurring role on Grey's Anatomy, her voicing of the Failsafe AI in the video game Destiny 2 and Jing Harris in Duncanville. Osmanski played Paula Brooks / Tigress in the DC Universe series Stargirl.

== Career ==
Osmanski played the recurring character "Maggie Tompkins" on the NBC show Save Me starring Anne Heche. She has also voiced "Julie" on the FOX animated show Allen Gregory, created by and also starring Jonah Hill. She has also starred as the recurring character "Winnie Hyde" in the unaired NBC series Next Caller created by Stephen Falk and also starring Dane Cook, Collette Wolfe and Jeffrey Tambor.

Osmanski had a guest starring position on the ABC sitcom Better Off Ted as Lucy and also guest starred on the FX TV series It's Always Sunny in Philadelphia as Jackie. She also had notable recurring roles on Samantha Who? as Tracy and on Grey's Anatomy as surgical intern Lucy. She was recurring on the sitcom True Jackson, VP as Ms. Park.

She has also appeared on the TV shows Good Job, Thanks!, Men of a Certain Age (as Lindsey), Dwelling (as Thai Lady), Chaos (as Unchin Song) and Numb3rs. She has also starred in the TV movies Family Album (as Holly Shapiro), Nathan vs. Nurture (as Lexi Miller), Five Year Plan (as Judy).

Osmanski has appeared in the feature films Fired Up! (as curious cheerleader) and Alvin and the Chipmunks: The Squeakquel (as airline rep). For independent films, Osmanski stars as Jinnie Park in Christine Yoo's film, Wedding Palace opposite Brian Tee, and also stars as Amy in Dave Boyle's films, Surrogate Valentine and Daylight Savings. She also stars as Mary in Dave Boyle's film, White on Rice. She also had a recurring role as Joy on Devious Maids. In 2017, she appeared in the Netflix comedy series Santa Clarita Diet.

Joy Osmanski has also provided the voice of the Failsafe AI, a non-playable character in Bungie's video game Destiny 2 alongside Nolan North, Lance Reddick, Nathan Fillion, and more.

In 2020, Osmanski was cast in a recurring role on DC Universe/The CW’s Stargirl as supervillain Paula Brooks / Tigress for the shows first two seasons. In 2021 it was announced that Osmanski was upped to series regular for the third and final season.

== Personal life ==
Osmanski was born in Seoul, South Korea and adopted by American parents. She does not know the identity of her birth parents, but a DNA test uncovered significant Japanese ancestry. She graduated from Principia College with a degree in creative writing and studio art, and from the University of California, San Diego with an MFA from the graduate acting program.

She has been married to actor Corey Brill since 2009, and they have one daughter.

== Filmography ==
=== Film ===
| Year | Title | Role | Notes |
|---|---|---|---|
| 2007 | A Fat Girl's Guide to Yoga | Receptionist | Short film |
| 2007 | Borderline | | Short film |
| 2009 | Fired Up! | Curious Cheerleader | |
| 2009 | White on Rice | Mary | |
| 2009 | A New Color | Melanie Wynn | Short |
| 2009 | Alvin and the Chipmunks: The Squeakquel | Airline Rep | |
| 2011 | Surrogate Valentine | Amy | |
| 2012 | Daylight Savings | Amy | |
| 2013 | Wedding Palace | Jinnie Park | |
| 2016 | Superpowerless | Radio Announcer No. 3 (voice) | Voice role |
| 2017 | Shot | Nurse Samantha | |
| 2017 | Dead Night | Mika Shand | |

=== Television ===
| Year | Title | Role | Notes |
|---|---|---|---|
| 2006–2007 | The Loop | Darcy | Main role – 17 episodes |
| 2007–2008 | Samantha Who? | Tracy | Recurring role – 4 episodes |
| 2007–2008 | Grey's Anatomy | Lucy | Recurring role – 8 episodes |
| 2008 | Five Year Plan | Judy | TV film |
| 2009 | Numbers | File Clerk | Episode: "Greatest Hits" |
| 2009 | Better Off Ted | Lucy | Episode: "Bioshuffle" |
| 2009 | It's Always Sunny in Philadelphia | Jackie | Episode: "The Waitress Is Getting Married" |
| 2009–2011 | True Jackson, VP | Patti Park | Recurring role – 11 episodes |
| 2010 | Nathan vs. Nurture | Lexi Miller | TV film |
| 2011 | Chaos | Unchin Song | Episode: "Song of the North" |
| 2011 | Dwelling | Thai Lady | Recurring role – 4 episodes |
| 2011 | Men of a Certain Age | Lindsey | 2 episodes |
| 2011 | Slanted | Lee | Episode: "Action!" |
| 2011 | Allen Gregory | Julie De Longpre | Main voice role – 7 episodes |
| 2011 | Family Album | Holly Shapiro | Unsold TV pilot |
| 2011–2013 | Good Job, Thanks! | Assistant / Ex-Assistant No. 1 | Recurring role – 4 episodes |
| 2012–2013 | Next Caller | Winnie Hyde | Main role – 5 episodes |
| 2013 | Middle Age Rage | Mimi Duncan | TV film |
| 2013 | Save Me | Maggie Tompkins | Main role – 6 episodes |
| 2014 | Kirstie | Amy | Episode: "The Girl Next Door" |
| 2014 | Legit | Lisanne | Episode: "Reunion" |
| 2014 | See Dad Run | Mrs. Lee | Episode: "See Dad Run Joe Into Detention" |
| 2014 | Kingdom | Jennifer | Episode: "The Gentle Slope" |
| 2014 | Mulaney | Alexa | Episode: "Motif & the City" |
| 2015 | Perception | Hospital Doctor | Episode: "Brainstorm" |
| 2015 | The Following | Anna Clarke | 2 episodes |
| 2015 | The Mysteries of Laura | Linda Singer | Episode: "The Mystery of the Intoxicated Intern" |
| 2015 | Castle | Liz Bell | Episode: "Dead from New York" |
| 2015 | Devious Maids | Joy | Recurring role (season 3) – 4 episodes |
| 2016 | Lucifer | Sandy Shaw / Alexandra Shaw | 2 episodes |
| 2016 | Younger | Kiko Kagami | Episode: "A Kiss Is Just a Kiss" |
| 2016 | Late Bloomers: The Chloe & Sage Chronicles | Michelle Lee | TV film |
| 2016 | Gorgeous Morons | Mary | TV film |
| 2016 | Still Single | Michelle Lee | TV movie |
| 2017 | iZombie | Barb Gant | Episode: "Some Like It Hot Mess" |
| 2017 | Freakish | Felicity | Recurring role – 4 episodes |
| 2017–2019 | Santa Clarita Diet | Alondra | Recurring role – 6 episodes |
| 2018 | Will & Grace | Trish Yashida | Episode: "Where In the World Is Karen Walker?" |
| 2019 | Shameless | Dr. Kawn | Recurring role – 3 episodes |
| 2019 | The Good Doctor | Laura Petrie | Episode: "Breakdown" |
| 2020 | Magnum P.I. | Ana Chua | Episode: "A Game of Cat and Mouse" |
| 2020 | Monsterland | Faye / Old Hag | Episode: "Iron River, Michigan" |
| 2020–2021 | S.W.A.T. | Agent Jennifer Carr | 2 episodes |
| 2020–2022 | Duncanville | Jing Harris | Recurring role (Season 1), Main role (Season 2–3) – 39 episodes |
| 2020–2022 | Stargirl | Paula Brooks / Tigress | Recurring role (Season 1–2), Main role (Season 3) – 16 episodes |
| 2022 | American Dad! | Port-a-Potty Captive | Voice role, episode: "A League of His Own" |
| 2022 | 1923 | Alice Davis | Episode: "Nothing Left to Lose" |
| 2023 | Hailey's On It! | Sunny Denoga | Recurring voice role |
| 2023 | Family Guy | Party Guest | Voice role, episode: "Adult Education" |
| 2025 | Creature Commandos | Lily Mazursky | Voice role, episode: "A Very Funny Monster" |
| 2025 | Boots | Setsuko McAffey | 2 episodes |
| 2026 | High Potential | Katie Millay | Episode: "In the Driver's Seat" |

=== Video games ===
| Year | Title | Role | Notes |
|---|---|---|---|
| 2017–present | Destiny 2 | Failsafe | Voice |
| 2018 | Epic Seven | Mercedes, Gloomyrain, Aerin | Voice – English version |
| 2019 | Rage 2 | Ark AI / Donna Rex / Lagooney Guard | Voice |
| 2020 | Fallout 76: Wastelanders | Cherise / Maximum Maddie | Voice |
| 2022 | Guild Wars 2 | Ayumi / Claw of Koda / Precinct Captain Min | Voice |
