= Big Dreams Little Tokyo =

- Film poster
- Directed by: Dave Boyle
- Written by: Dave Boyle
- Produced by: Duane Andersen; Meg Boyle
- Starring: Dave Boyle; Jayson Watabe; Rachel Morihiro; Drew Knight; Pepe Serna
- Cinematography: Bill Otto
- Edited by: Duane Andersen; Scott Hurst
- Music by: Mark Schulz
- Production companies: Brainwave; Beagledorp Productions
- Distributed by: Echo Bridge Home Entertainment
- Release date: November 2, 2006 (AFI Fest)
- Running time: 85 minutes
- Country: United States
- Language: English

Big Dreams Little Tokyo is a 2006 feature-length comedy film written and directed by Dave Boyle. The film premiered November 2, 2006 at the AFI Festival in Hollywood, California and was released on DVD through Echo Bridge on July 22, 2008.

== Plot ==
Boyd is an American with an uncanny ability to speak Japanese. He aspires to succeed in the world of Japanese business but finds himself mostly on the outside looking in. Meanwhile, his roommate Jerome is a Japanese American who has always felt too American to be Japanese but too Japanese to be American. He aspires to be a sumo wrestler but finds his weight and blood pressure are thwarting his dreams. Together they struggle to find their place in a world where cultural identity is seldom what it seems.

== Cast ==
Actor	Character
Dave Boyle	Boyd
Jayson Watabe	Jerome
Rachel Morihiro	Mai
Drew Knight	Andy
Pepe Serna	Mr. Gonzalez
Michael Yama	Mr. Ozu
James Kyson Lee	Murakami
Sonny Saito	Mr. Tanaka
Bobby Suetsugu	Mr. Sugimoto
Naohiro Takita	Mr. Fuji

== Production ==
The film was the feature debut of Boyle who conceived the idea while living in the Japantown area of Sydney, Australia. Many of the characters in the film were based on people he met and interacted with while there. It was shot in the summer of 2005 in San Jose and San Francisco, California as well as Salt Lake City, Utah. Big Dreams Little Tokyo was produced by Duane Andersen and Megan Boyle.
