= Surrogate Valentine =

- Film poster
- Directed by: Dave Boyle
- Written by: Dave Boyle; Joel Clark; Goh Nakamura
- Produced by: Duane Andersen; Dave Boyle
- Starring: Goh Nakamura; Chadd Stoops; Lynn Chen; Parry Shen; Calpernia Addams; Joy Osmanski; Eric M. Levy; Mary Cavett
- Cinematography: Bill Otto
- Edited by: Duane Andersen; Dave Boyle; Michael Lerman
- Music by: Goh Nakamura
- Distributed by: Tiger Industry Films; Brainwave
- Release date: September 30, 2011
- Running time: 114 minutes
- Country: United States
- Language: English

Surrogate Valentine is a 2011 independent comedy film directed and produced by Dave Boyle. The film's plot concerns a musician named Goh Nakamura, playing a fictionalized version of himself. It is the first in a trilogy following Nakamura's character, followed by Daylight Savings (2012) and I Will Make You Mine (2020).

== Premise ==
San Francisco indie musician Goh Nakamura lives a life playing shows on the road. He reconnects with his high school crush, and is hired to teach an actor, Danny Turner, how to play guitar for a film role.

== Cast ==
- Goh Nakamura as himself
- Chadd Stoops as Danny Turner
- Lynn Chen as Rachel
- Parry Shen as Bradley
- Mary Cavett as Valerie
- Joy Osmanski as Amy
- Calpernia Addams as Tammi
- Eric M. Levy as Arthur
- Dan Damage as Mark
- Di Quon as Emily

== Reception ==
Critical response to the film was generally positive. Rotten Tomatoes reports a 60% approval rating based on 5 reviews.

John DeFore of The Hollywood Reporter called the film "a slight, but amiable buddy comedy" as well as saying that it "offers a certain mild slacker charm". Michelle Orange of The Village Voice also gave a positive review of the film saying that it "cultivates a sweet, shucksy tone that wears thin in some of the early scenes, but ultimately deepens into genuine heart". David DeWitt of The New York Times wrote that the film "sometimes catches an insightful moment in the offstage lives of gigging musicians, and shots of San Francisco have photo-realist charm. But the story never asserts itself in any dramatic or comedic or even home-movie fashion."
