= Daylight Savings (film) =

- Film poster
- Directed by: Dave Boyle
- Written by: Dave Boyle; Michael Lerman; Joel Clark; Goh Nakamura
- Produced by: Duane Andersen; Michael Lerman
- Starring: Goh Nakamura
- Cinematography: Bill Otto
- Edited by: Dave Boyle; Michael Lerman; Duane Andersen
- Music by: Goh Nakamura
- Production companies: Tiger Industry Films; Brainwave Films
- Release date: March 10, 2012 (SXSW)
- Running time: 72 minutes
- Country: United States
- Language: English

Daylight Savings is a 2012 American comedy film written by Dave Boyle, Michael Lerman, Joel Clark and Goh Nakamura, directed by Boyle and starring Nakamura. It is the sequel to Boyle's 2011 film Surrogate Valentine, and is followed by I Will Make You Mine (2020).

== Cast ==
- Goh Nakamura as himself
- Michael Aki as Mike
- Yea-Ming Chen as Yea-Ming
- Lynn Chen as Rachel
- Ayako Fujitani as Erika
- Jane Lui as herself
- Will Long as The Beast
- Joy Osmanski as Amy
- Aya Nakamura as Herself
- Theresa Navarro as Cindy
- Duane Andersen as Moustache
- Michael Tully as Banana Man
- Chadd Stoops as Danny Turner

== Release ==
The film premiered at South by Southwest on March 10, 2012.

== Reception ==
Dennis Harvey of Variety gave the film a positive review and wrote, "Pic has some funnier incidents than the first film, as well as a little more narrative oomph within a still-loose framework."

Peter Martin of Screen Anarchy also gave the film a positive review and wrote, "Less a sequel to Surrogate Valentine than another chapter in the life of an itinerant musician, Dave Boyle's Daylight Savings is charming, low-key, and self-effacing, reflecting the appealing on-screen personality of Goh Nakamura."

J. R. Jones of the Chicago Reader gave the film a negative review and wrote, "...this is one of those indie walk-and-talks—like Medicine for Melancholy or In Search of a Midnight Kiss—that aim no higher than to replicate the buzz of a good first date.
