= Superpowerless (film) =

- Directed by: Duane Andersen
- Written by: Duane Andersen; Dominic Mah
- Produced by: Duane Andersen; Yukie Hashimoto; Alun Lee
- Starring: Josiah Polhemus; Amy Prosser; Natalie Lander; Guinevere Turner; Pepe Serna; H.P. Mendoza
- Cinematography: Bill Otto
- Edited by: Duane Andersen; Dave Boyle
- Music by: Sarah Saturday
- Production company: Brainwave Films
- Distributed by: First Pond Entertainment
- Release date: July 24, 2016 (Fantasia International Film Festival)
- Country: United States
- Language: English

Superpowerless is a 2016 American feature film and the feature directorial debut of Duane Andersen. An autobiographical collaboration between Andersen and childhood friend/lead actor/co-producer Josiah Polhemus, the screenplay was written by Andersen and Dominic Mah. Production took place in early 2014 throughout the San Francisco Bay Area including Andersen and Polhemus's hometown of Palo Alto. The film premiered in July 2016 at the Fantasia International Film Festival and was released in the Fall of 2017 by First Pond Entertainment.

== Plot ==
Bob (Josiah Polhemus) is a typical, frustrated forty-something guy. He spends his days wandering and drinking. The more help he is offered the more frustrated he becomes. One might think that his situation is typical of millions of others who have suffered a sense of loss and a frustrating lack of purpose once they reach forty. But Bob is a bit different... Bob used to be Captain Truth, a masked superhero fighting crime throughout the Bay Area. Now, however, he's just Bob, and it's hard to get used to.

Mimi (Amy Prosser), Bob's girlfriend, is facing her own challenges. Years ago she dreamed of moving to Rome and becoming a museum curator, but now she finds herself as an assistant in a law firm, with the chance for a lucrative promotion. As her future takes shape, she wonders if it's the future she really wants.

Mimi encourages Bob to write a book, in an effort to soothe his mind and put things into perspective. He hires Danniell (Natalie Lander), a college English major, to help him get his thoughts down cohesively. She thinks Bob's book is worth publishing, and has her eyes set on Bob himself. As Bob and Danniell's relationship blossoms, Bob is tempted to risk losing Mimi, the one thing in his life that makes any sense.

Meanwhile, Mimi discovers that she's pregnant. Bob has always been insistent that he didn't want kids, and with a potential new promotion, and her relationship with Bob deteriorating, she wonders if giving up the child might be the smartest thing.

They both struggle as they learn that the best way to make the future worthwhile is to live the current moment as if it's the most important of all.
