= House of Ninjas =

2024 Japanese television series

- Genre: Thriller; Drama; Action
- Created by: Dave Boyle
- Written by: Masahiro Yamaura and Kata Oura
- Directed by: Dave Boyle; Kento Kaku
- Starring: Kento Kaku; Yōsuke Eguchi; Tae Kimura; Kengo Kora; Aju Makita; Riho Yoshioka; Nobuko Miyamoto; Takayuki Yamada
- Country of origin: Japan
- Original language: Japanese
- No. of seasons: 1
- No. of episodes: 8

Production
- Running time: 51–55 minutes

Original release
- Network: Netflix
- Release: February 15, 2024

House of Ninjas (Japanese: 忍びの家, Hepburn: Shinobi no Ie) is a Japanese television series developed by Dave Boyle for Netflix based on a story by Kento Kaku (acting as co-executive producer), Yoshiaki Murrao and Takafumi Imai. It stars Kaku as the protagonist, alongside Yōsuke Eguchi, Tae Kimura, Kengo Kora, Aju Makita, Nobuko Miyamoto, and Riho Yoshioka. It follows a family of ninjas, known as shinobi, as they struggle to connect as a family and return to the shinobi lifestyle.

House of Ninjas was released worldwide on February 15, 2024.

== Premise ==
The series revolves around the Tawaras, a shinobi family that lives in a traditional 'house of ninjas' in present-day Japan and are descended from Hattori Hanzō. Six years ago, the eldest son died during a mission to rescue a kidnapped politician, and the Tawaras abandoned their role in the government. They aim to be a normal family, but struggle with some idiosyncratic dysfunctions. When a new crisis unfolds, however, the family is drawn back into the shadows of its past.

== Cast ==
- Kento Kaku as Haru Tawara

The second-oldest son of the Tawara family of ninjas. He feels responsible for the death of his older brother Gaku, who was killed by an assailant whom Haru spared.

- Yōsuke Eguchi as Soichi Tawara

The patriarch of the Tawara family of ninjas and a descendant of Hattori Hanzō. Since the death of his oldest son Gaku, he has since retired from ninja duties and relegated his life to running the family brewery as a normal civilian, not knowing that his remaining son, daughter, and wife have secretly continued using their abilities for missions.

- Tae Kimura as Yoko Tawara

The wife of Soichi and a small-time shoplifter who is the first to secretly utilize her skills for a mission regarding the cruiser six years ago from which her son Gaku had died on.

- Kengo Kora as Gaku Tawara

The oldest son of the Tawara family who was killed six years ago during a mission to rescue a kidnapped politician.

- Aju Makita as Nagi Tawara

The only daughter of the Tawara family and a college student who utilized her skills to commit a series of high-profile museum thefts that gets her involved in a public conspiracy.

- Nobuko Miyamoto as Taki Tawara

The grandmother and Soichi's mother.

- Riho Yoshioka as Karen Ito

A journalist whom Haru meets regularly at a beef bowl restaurant. She becomes involved when her paper assigns her to investigate a case that Hamashima informs Haru to stop her from doing so.

- Tomorowo Taguchi as Jin Hamashima

The head of the Bureau of Ninja Management who assigns missions to the Tawara family.

- Bambi Naka as Ayame

An assassin working for the Gentenkai cult.

- Tokio Emoto as Masamitsu Oki

A junior member of the Bureau of Ninja Management working under Hamashima.

- Mariko Tsutsui as Touko Mukai

A high-profile politician who was the subject of a kidnapping six years ago, but was rescued by the Tawara family on the day her kidnappers' ransom was announced.

- Kyusaku Shimada as Kosaku Kuze

A cleaner and interrogator for the Bureau of Ninja Management

- Pierre Taki as Zensuke Omi

A police detective investigating the ninja conflict between the Tawara and Fuma.

- Tenta Banka as Riku Tawara

The youngest son of the Tawara family with no knowledge of the ninja activities of his family.

- Takayuki Yamada as Yosuke Tsujioke

The leader of the Gentenkai cult. He is the 19th "Fuma Kotaro" of the Fuma clan and was the man whom Haru spared six years ago.

- Aoba Kawai as Mori Mayuko

The new sales manager at Tawara Brewery with a mysterious past.

== Episodes ==
No.	Title	Directed by	Written by	Original release date
1	"The Offer"	Dave Boyle and Kento Kaku	Dave Boyle	February 15, 2024
2	"The Trail"	Dave Boyle	Masahiro Yamaura and Kota Oura	February 15, 2024
3	"The Flower"	Dave Boyle	Kota Oura and Masahiro Yamaura	February 15, 2024
4	"The Resurrection"	Yoshiaki Murao	Kota Oura and Masahiro Yamaura	February 15, 2024
5	"The Confession"	Yoshiaki Murao	Masahiro Yamaura and Kota Oura	February 15, 2024
6	"The Stranger"	Dave Boyle and Kento Kaku	TBD	February 15, 2024
7	"The Trade"	Dave Boyle and Kento Kaku	TBD	February 15, 2024
8	"The Eclipse"	Dave Boyle and Kento Kaku	TBD	February 15, 2024

== Reception ==
The review aggregator Rotten Tomatoes reported a 100% approval rating based on 7 critic reviews.

Netflix reported that in February 2024, the show was number one in the Weekly Global Top 10 (Non-English) in the second week of release.
