= Michael Yama =

American actor (1943–2020)

- Born: November 14, 1943 Hawaii
- Died: July 30, 2020 (aged 76)
- Occupations: Voice actor, actor

Michael Yama (November 14, 1943 – July 30, 2020) was an American actor who regularly voiced for GI Joe. His credits included The X-Files, Just Shoot Me! and Lois & Clark, and he starred on Betty White's Off Their Rockers. Prior to his death on July 30, 2020, he had worked in theater for over 38 years.

== Partial filmography ==
- The Bad News Bears Go to Japan (1978) as Usher
- Hansel and Gretel (1983) as Step Mother / Wicked Witch
- My Tutor (1983) as Mr. Russell
- Deal of the Century (1983) as Masaggi's Aide #2
- Indiana Jones and the Temple of Doom (1984) as Chinese Co-Pilot
- Bachelor Party (1984) as Japanese Businessman
- The Jeffersons (1985) 11x09 as Mr Lee
- G.I. Joe (1985) as Torpedo (Voice)
- Down and Out in Beverly Hills (1986) as Nagamichi
- Winners Take All (1987) as Japanese Representative
- Number One with a Bullet (1987) as Charlie 'Tai Chi Charlie'
- The Hidden (1987) as Sketch Artist
- Stand and Deliver (1988) as Sanzaki
- Catchfire (1990) as Technician
- It's Pat (1994) as Curious Sushi Man
- Spicy City (1997) as Otaku (Voice)
- Molly (1999) as Asian Client
- Chain of Command (2000) as Chairman Tzu
- Now Chinatown (2000) as Deputy Consul
- Elvis Took a Bullet (2001) as Larry, The Waiter
- All Babes Want to Kill Me (2005) as Mr. Cho
- Avatar: The Last Airbender (2005) as Shyu (voice)
- True Crime: New York City (2005) as Additional voices
- Dead Rising (2006) as Larry Chiang (voice)
- Speechless (2006) as Mr. Sakamoto
- Click (2006) as Watsuhita, Head Executive
- Big Dreams Little Tokyo (2006) as Mr. Ozu
- Doctor Strange: The Sorcerer Supreme (2007) as Ancient One (voice)
- Drillbit Taylor (2008) as Asian Heritage Speaker
- The Sensei (2008) as Yori Nakano
- The Chosen One (2010) as Mr. Nakamuri
- Pure Country 2: The Gift (2010) as Morita
- Adultolescence (2011) as Mr. May / Baba
- Betty White's Off Their Rockers (2013-2014) as Various characters
- Dumb and Dumber To (2014) as Harry's Dad
- I'll See You in My Dreams (2015) as Speed Dater 4
- Hail, Caesar! (2016) as Chinese Restaurant Maitre D'
- The Edge of Sleep (2019) as The Whale / The Old Man
- Avatar: The Last Airbender: Agni Kai (2020) as Fire Priest
