= Tokyo! =

2008 anthology film

- Japanese theatrical release poster
- Directed by: Michel Gondry; Leos Carax; Bong Joon-ho
- Written by: Michel Gondry; Gabrielle Bell; Leos Carax; Bong Joon-ho
- Based on: Cecil and Jordan in New York by Gabrielle Bell ("Interior Design")
- Produced by: Masa Sawada; Michiko Yoshitake
- Starring: Ayako Fujitani; Ryō Kase; Denis Lavant; Jean-François Balmer; Teruyuki Kagawa; Yū Aoi
- Cinematography: Masami Inomoto; Caroline Champetier; Jun Fukumoto
- Edited by: Nelly Quettier; Jeff Buchanan
- Music by: Étienne Charry; Lee Byung-woo
- Production companies: Comme des Cinémas; Kansai Television Corporation; Bitters End; Sponge Entertainment; Arte France Cinéma; Coin Film; WDR/Arte
- Distributed by: Haut et Court (France); Bitters End (Japan); Sidus FNH (South Korea)
- Release dates: 14 May 2008 (Cannes); 16 August 2008 (Japan); 15 October 2008 (France); 23 October 2008 (South Korea)
- Running time: 107 minutes
- Countries: France; Japan; South Korea; Germany
- Languages: Japanese; French
- Box office: $1.2 million

Tokyo! is a 2008 comedy-drama anthology film containing three segments written by three non-Japanese directors and filmed in Tokyo, Japan. Michel Gondry directed "Interior Design", Leos Carax directed "Merde", and Bong Joon-ho directed "Shaking Tokyo"

== Plot ==
=== "Interior Design" ===
Directed by Michel Gondry. "Interior Design" is an adaptation of the short story comic "Cecil and Jordan in New York" by Gabrielle Bell.

Hiroko and Akira are a young couple from the provinces who arrive in Tokyo with a limited budget, staying temporarily in their friend Akemi's cramped studio apartment. Akira is an aspiring filmmaker who has come to Tokyo to screen his debut feature film. The next day, the couple start looking for an apartment of their own, but only find unsuitable and expensive housing. At Hiroko's suggestion, she and Akira both apply for a part-time job as a gift wrapper at a local department store, but only Akira gets the job.

After Akira's film screens to dubious acclaim, one spectator discusses with Hiroko how difficult relationships with creative types are, recounting that she felt invisible while dating a painter who prioritized his work over their relationship. Hiroko relates to these feelings in the wake of her numerous trials and tribulations in the unfamiliar city of Tokyo and starts questioning her role in the relationship. Meanwhile, Akemi's boyfriend grows weary of her houseguests.

Hiroko wakes up one morning and is shocked to see a hand-sized hole in her chest with a round wooden splats down the middle. As she walks down the street, the hole grows larger, and she stumbles as her feet successively turn to wooden poles. Eventually, Hiroko is turned into an inanimate chair, with only her jacket left hanging on the back. People walking past are oblivious to the chair until one man tries to drag it home. When his back is turned, the chair turns into a human Hiroko, who flees into a bus stop nude and reassumes her chair form that an older woman briefly sits on.

Realizing that she can only turn human when no one else sees her and will turn back into a chair in plain sight, Hiroko props herself in chair form on a street where a musician takes her up to his apartment and takes good care of her, which she appreciates. After briefly wandering around in the musician's apartment alone, Hiroko writes a farewell letter to Akira, saying she has never felt so useful in her life and wishing him the best as his filmmaking career takes off.

=== "Merde" ===
Directed by Léos Carax.

"Merde" (French for "shit") is the name given to an unkempt, gibberish-spewing, gnome-like subterranean creature of the Tokyo sewers, who rises from the underground lair where he dwells to attack unsuspecting locals in increasingly brazen and terrifying ways. He steals cash and cigarettes from passers-by, frightens older women, and sexually assaults schoolgirls, resulting in a televised media frenzy that creates mounting hysteria among the city's inhabitants. After discovering an arsenal of hand grenades in his underground lair, Merde goes on a rampage, hurling the munitions at random citizens, which the media promptly cover. French magistrate Maître Voland arrives in Tokyo to represent Merde's inevitable televised trial, claiming to be one of only three in the world able to speak his client's unintelligible language. The media circus mounts as a lawyer defends a client in a surreal court of law hungry for a satisfying resolution. Merde is tried, convicted, and sentenced to death until he survives his execution and disappears into a sewer vent.

=== "Shaking Tokyo" ===
Directed by Bong Joon-ho.

A reclusive Tokyo man living as a hikikomori has not left his apartment in a decade. His only link to the outside world is through his telephone, which he uses to take advantage of delivery services, such as the pizza that he orders every Saturday, thus resulting in hundreds of pizza cartons stacked in his meticulously organized apartment. One day, his pizza is delivered by a lovely young woman who succeeds in catching the shut-in's eye. Suddenly, an earthquake strikes Tokyo, prompting the delivery woman to faint in the hikikomori's apartment, causing him to fall hopelessly in love. Some time later, the shut-in discovers through another pizza delivery person that the improbable object of his affection has quit her job and become a hikikomori in her own right. Taking a bold leap into the unknown, he crosses the threshold of his apartment and goes to the streets in search of the girl. Eventually, he discovers his kindred spirit, and at the very moment, another earthquake strikes.

== Cast ==
=== "Interior Design" ===
- Ayako Fujitani as Hiroko
- Ryō Kase as Akira
- Ayumi Ito as Akemi
- Nao Ōmori as Hiroshi
- Satoshi Tsumabuki as Takeshi

=== "Merde" ===
- Denis Lavant as Mr Merde
- Jean-François Balmer as Mr Voland, the lawyer
- Julie Dreyfus as Voland's interpreter
- Andrée Damant

=== "Shaking Tokyo" ===
- Teruyuki Kagawa as the hikikomori
- Yū Aoi as the pizza delivery girl
- Naoto Takenaka as the pizza store manager

== Music ==
During the credits, HASYMO's single "Tokyo Town Pages" plays. The trailer features the track "Be Good" by Canadian indie rock band Tokyo Police Club.

== Reception ==
On the review aggregator website Rotten Tomatoes, the film holds an approval rating of 76% based on 66 reviews, with an average rating of 6.6/10. The website's critics consensus reads: "An imaginative, if uneven, love letter to a city that signals a great creative enterprise by its three contributing directors." Metacritic, which uses a weighted average, assigned the film a score of 63 out of 100, based on 18 critics, indicating "generally favorable" reviews.

Justin Chang of Variety described the film as "uneven but enjoyable."
