= Lynn Chen =

American actress

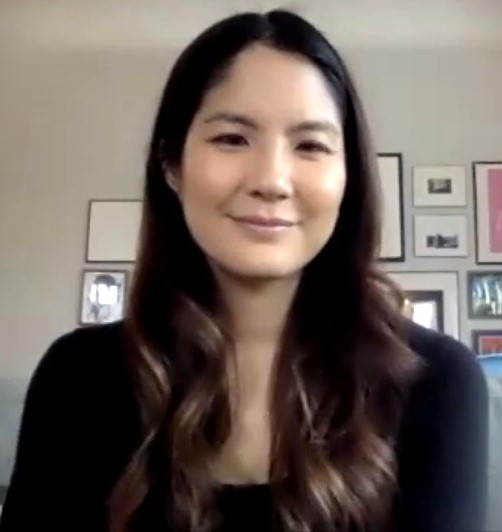
- Chen in 2021
- Born: Queens, New York, U.S.
- Education: Wesleyan University
- Occupations: Actress; singer; filmmaker; audiobook narrator; blogger
- Years active: 2001–present
- Spouse: Abe Forman-Greenwald

Lynn Chen (Chinese: 陳凌; pinyin: chén líng) is a Taiwanese-American actress and singer. She is best known for playing Vivian Shing in the film Saving Face, a role for which she won the "Outstanding Newcomer Award" at the 2006 Asian Excellence Awards. She also narrates audiobooks, including the audiobook edition of Kevin Kwan's novel Crazy Rich Asians. She writes the popular food blog The Actor's Diet. Chen was named a 2013 "New Change Agent" by Marie Claire.

== Early life ==
Chen was born in Queens, New York and raised in Cresskill, New Jersey. Her mother is an opera singer and father was the founding president of The Kunqu Society, Inc. She has one brother; he is also in the music field. Her parents came to America from Taiwan in the late 1960s. Chen attended Wesleyan University, where she studied Women's Studies and Music.

== Career ==
Chen has appeared in Alice Wu's film Saving Face as Vivian Shing opposite Michelle Krusiec (playing Wilhemina Pang, Shing's love interest) and Joan Chen. For her role in that film, she won the "Outstanding Newcomer Award" at the 2006 Asian Excellence Awards.

=== Television ===
In 2014, Chen appeared on the episode "Proof of Concept" of Mike Judge's HBO show, Silicon Valley as Grace Melcher. Before Saving Face, Chen appeared on TV shows such as All My Children (as reoccurring character Regina), Law & Order (as Jenny Wu), Law & Order: Special Victims Unit (as Helen Chen), and a 2002 episode of Saturday Night Live hosted by Jon Stewart as a Vietnamese Girl. She has also appeared on the TV Shows Law & Order: Trial by Jury (as Lin – Kressel's Assistant), Numb3rs (as Bree Eng), NCIS: Los Angeles (as Nurse Lisa), and the pilot for the show The Singles Table (as Lexi Park). In 2015 she played a nurse in the pilot episode of The Walking Dead spinoff series Fear the Walking Dead.

=== Feature films ===
Chen has also appeared in feature films such as Neil LaBute's Lakeview Terrace (2008) opposite Samuel L. Jackson (as Eden), David Langlitz's Mentor (2006) opposite Rutger Hauer (as Susan), Quentin Lee's The People I've Slept With (2009) (as Juliet, the sister of Karin Anna Cheung's character), Richard Wong's Yes, We're Open (2012) (as Sylvia, the wife of Parry Shen's character), Dave Boyle's White on Rice (2009) (as Ramona), Dave Boyle's Surrogate Valentine (2011) and Daylight Savings (2012) (as Rachel), Tom Huang's Why Am I Doing This? (2009) (as Katie), Kedar Korde's Xs & Oxs (2007) (as Gwen), Jennifer Sharp's I'm Through with White Girls (The Inevitable Undoing of Jay Brooks (2007) (as Candace), and Mark Levin's Little Manhattan (2005). She wrote and directed the 2020 film I Will Make You Mine, which was the third in the Surrogate Valentine trilogy and was a selection of the 2020 South By Southwest Film Festival.

=== Audiobook narration ===
Chen works as an audiobook narrator. She recorded the Random House Audio edition of Kevin Kwan's 2013 novel Crazy Rich Asians, a reading in which, according to Kirkus Reviews, she varies her pitch for male and female characters and makes the book's broad cast distinctive. She is also among the narrators of the audiobook of Te-Ping Chen's 2021 story collection Land of Big Numbers.

=== Web series and online content ===
She currently appears on a web series entitled Nice Girls Crew directed by Tanuj Chopra (Sundance Film Festival Humanitas Prize Winner Punching at the Sun) and written by Chopra and Christine Kwon. The web series also stars her Saving Face co-star Michelle Krusiec as well as Sheetal Sheth. She also appears on an episode of Andrea Lwin's web series, Slanted (as Samantha). Chen has also written and produced a short film entitled Via Text (2011), which was directed by her husband Abe Forman-Greenwald.

== Filmography ==
=== Film ===
Year	Title	Role	Notes
2002	Fortune	Jen	Short
2002	Up to the Roof	DJ Night 1	Short
2004	Saving Face	Vivian Shing	
2005	Fly Me Home		Short
2005	Little Manhattan	Girl on the Street	
2006	Mentor	Susan	
2006	Desperate Housewife	Gynecologist	Short
2007	I'm Through with White Girls	Candace	
2007	X's & O's	Gwen	
2008	Lakeview Terrace	Eden	
2009	Why Am I Doing This?	Katie	
2009	White on Rice	Ramona	
2011	Surrogate Valentine	Rachel	
2011	Via Text		Short
2012	Daylight Savings	Rachel	
2012	Yes, We're Open	Sylvia	
2012	The People I've Slept With	Juliet	
2013	Abby White, Interracial Relationship Counselor	Linda	Short
2014	Teacher in a Box	Ms. Malloy	Short
2014	Sutures	Audrey	Short
2015	Dying to Kill	Tracy	
2016	Parachute Girls	Ellie	Short
2016	Chee and T	Lindo Chong	
2016	Baby and Me Yoga	Dana	Short
2017	Rice on White	Linda	Post-production
2017	Growing Apart	Loa	Short, completed
2019	Go Back to China	Carol Li	
2020	I Will Make You Mine	Rachel	Also writer and director
2021	Pooling to Paradise	Jenny	
2021	See You Then	Naomi Liu	

==== Television ====
Year	Title	Role	Notes
2001	Law & Order	Jenny Wu	"Teenage Wasteland"
2001	Law & Order: Special Victims Unit	Helen Chen	"Inheritance"
2002	Saturday Night Live	Vietnamese Girl	"Jon Stewart/India.Arie"
2003	All My Children	Regina	Recurring role
2005	Law & Order: Trial by Jury	Lin	"The Abominable Showman"
2005	Numb3rs	Bree Eng	"Soft Target"
2007	The Singles Table	Lexi Park	"Pilot", "The Housewarming Party"
2010	NCIS: Los Angeles	Nurse Lisa	"Anonymous"
2012	Slanted	Samantha	"Paying Your Dues"
2012–13	Nice Girls Crew	Sophie	Web series
2014	Silicon Valley	Grace Melcher	"Proof of Concept"
2015	Fear the Walking Dead	Nurse	"Pilot"
2015	The Lees of Los Angeles	Peggy Lee	"1.1"
2016	Parker and the Crew	Parker's mom	TV film
2016	Caring	Vicky	TV series
2019	Shameless	Mimi	Recurring role, 2 episodes
2021	Launchpad	Ann	"The Little Prince(ss)"
2021–22	Grey's Anatomy	Dr. Michelle Lin	Recurring role; 5 episodes
2024	High Potential	Nina	"Hangover"

=== Video games ===
Year	Title	Role	Notes
2015	Call of Duty: Black Ops III	Goh Xiulan	

=== Audiobooks ===
Year	Title	Author	Notes
2013	Crazy Rich Asians	Kevin Kwan	Random House Audio
2021	Land of Big Numbers	Te-Ping Chen	One of several narrators
