= White on Rice =

- Film poster
- Directed by: Dave Boyle
- Written by: Dave Boyle; Joel Clark
- Produced by: Duane Andersen; Dominic Fratto
- Starring: Hiroshi Wantanabe; Nae Yuuki; Mio Takada; James Kyson Lee; Justin Kwong
- Cinematography: Bill Otto
- Edited by: Duane Andersen
- Music by: Mark Schulz
- Production companies: Tiger Industry Films; Brainwave; Malatova Productions
- Distributed by: Tiger Industry Films; Variance Films
- Release date: 2009
- Running time: 82 minutes
- Country: United States
- Languages: English; Japanese

White on Rice is a 2009 comedy film directed by Dave Boyle and starring Hiroshi Watanabe, Nae Yuuki, Mio Takada, James Kyson Lee, and Lynn Chen. The film had its world premiere at the 27th annual San Francisco Asian American Film Festival on 17 March 2009.

== Plot ==
Jimmy loves dinosaurs and sleeps on the top bunk. Unfortunately, Jimmy is 40 and shares that bunk with Bob, his 10-year-old nephew. Freshly divorced, Jimmy lives with his sister Aiko and her family while boldly searching for a new wife. His brother-in-law, Tak thinks he's a disaster. And although Jimmy may lack social grace, he is convinced the best years of his life are just beginning. His plan seems like it’s all falling into place when Tak's beautiful niece Ramona moves in. But once Jimmy sets his sights on stealing her from his best friend Tim, he sees his intentions go hilariously awry.

== Cast ==
- Hiroshi Watanabe as Jimmy
- Nae Yuuki as Aiko
- Mio Takada as Tak
- Lynn Chen as Ramona
- James Kyson Lee as Tim
- Justin Kwong as Bob
- Pepe Serna as Professor Berk
- Joy Osmanski as Mary
- Cathy Shim as Betty
- David Christenson as Waiter
- Ron Elliot as Nathan
- Kayako Takatsuna as Shiho
- Jimmy Chunga as Stephens
- Jennifer Klekas as Susan
- Bruce Campbell as Muramoto (voice)
- Kitana Baker as Lingerie Saleswoman

== Production ==
The film was primarily shot in Salt Lake City, Utah, with a few locations in San Jose, California.

== Release ==
White on Rice became a festival favorite during the festival season of 2009. Its festival screenings included the Cleveland International Film Festival, the Newport Beach Film Festival, the Woodstock Film Festival and the São Paulo Film Festival. It was especially well received at Asian themed film festivals such as the Los Angeles Asian Pacific Film Festival where Dave Boyle and Joel Clark received awards for their screenplay and 13-year-old Justin Kwong received an award for his acting, and the San Diego Asian Film Festival where it won the Audience Award.

The film was self distributed through director Boyle's company Tiger Industry Films and Variance Films and premiered on September 11, 2009 in Los Angeles, California at the Laemmle Sunset 5 and in Irvine. The film subsequently traveled throughout the country playing in theaters in the San Francisco Bay Area, Hawaii, Salt Lake City, Denver, San Diego. A DVD release was scheduled for 2010.

== Reception ==
On review aggregator website Rotten Tomatoes, the film holds an approval rating of 45% based on reviews from 11 critics, with an average rating of 6/10. On Metacritic, the film has a weighted average score of 45 out of 100, based on 7 critics, indicating "mixed or average reviews".
