= Tokyo Cowboy =

- Theatrical release poster
- Directed by: Marc Marriott
- Written by: Ayako Fujitani; Dave Boyle
- Produced by: Brigham Taylor; Jeri Rafter; Marc Marriott
- Starring: Arata Iura; Robin Weigert; Ayako Fujitani; Goya Robles
- Cinematography: Oscar Ignacio Jiménez
- Edited by: Yasu Inoue
- Music by: Chad Cannon
- Production company: Salaryman Film LLC
- Distributed by: Purdie Distribution
- Release dates: October 2023 (Tallgrass); August 30, 2024
- Running time: 118 minutes
- Countries: Japan; United States
- Language: English
- Box office: $269,625

Tokyo Cowboy is a 2023 comedy-drama film directed by Marc Marriott and written by Ayako Fujitani and Dave Boyle. An American and Japanese co-production, the film stars Arata Iura in his American film debut. He plays Hideki, a Japanese businessman aiming to turn a Montana-based cattle ranch into a profitable asset for the Japanese company he works for. The film marks director Marc Marriott's first narrative feature.

== Plot ==
Japanese businessman Hideki (Arata Iura) takes over a chocolate company built by its owner, a grandfather with no grandchildren to inherit the company. While buying the chocolate company, he refuses to even taste its chocolate, showing how impersonal his business transactions are. When his boss and fiancée Keiko (Ayako Fujitani) threatens to sell a struggling cattle ranch in Montana to property developers, he convinces her that he can turn it into a profitable business that produces wagyu beef. He embarks on a trip to the United States to convince the American ranch owner.

In Montana, he meets ranch owner Peg (Robin Weigert) and ranch hand Javier (Gaya Robles). Due to cultural differences, he encounters difficulties with his original plan. The ranch hands dislike him, and they think he is just a foreign threat. The ranch itself is also not suitable for growing corn used to feed wagyu cows, and there are significant costs needed to rebuild the infrastructure needed.

At a loss of what to do, his new friend Javier acclimatises Hideki to the ranch, teaching him the ways of the cowboy. Hideki is initially extremely hesitant, having been a city boy all his life, despite his father owning a watermelon farm when he was a small boy. However, as Hideki grows to love the ranch and its people, putting in effort to learn its ways, he becomes a "Tokyo Cowboy," impressing the ranch hands and the ranch owner Peg.

Ultimately, Hideki and Javier come up with a brilliant but risky plan to buy the ranch so that it would not be sold to property developers. They would use the money made from selling quinoa that Javier was growing secretly on the ranch land. Peg agrees to it. Meanwhile, Hideki has been growing distant from Keiko, and cancels his planned flight back to Japan so that he can stay to take care of the ranch. They were supposed to have gone to an onsen couple trip but she is offended and has to cancel it because of him. Keiko then flies all the way to Montana to fire him and also to break off their five-year engagement, after feeling betrayed by him.

With their relationship in shambles and with the threat of the ranch being sold off to property developers by Keiko, Hideki tries his best to salvage the situation by introducing Keiko to the ranch and telling her about their plan to buy the ranch. Keiko is impressed by the ranch and his plan. Hideki shows that he has not forgotten her by bringing her to a nearby hot spring he had found, similar to an onsen. He apologises for not asking her what she wanted from their relationship and they reconcile.

== Cast ==
- Arata Iura as Hideki
- Ayako Fujitani as Keiko
- Goya Robles as Javier
- Robin Weigert as Peg
- Jun Kunimura as Wada

== Production ==
Development on the film was inspired by an American magazine article that director Marc Marriott came across upon his return to the United States from Japan, where he served as a filmmaking apprentice to Yoji Yamada. The magazine article covered a Japanese beef company which purchased a cattle ranch in Montana "to expand its operations". The company sent salarymen to the ranch in order to educate its staff on American cattle farming, as well as to introduce Americans to "the Japanese palate".

Arata Iura stars as Hideki, marking his American film debut. Filming took place in Tokyo and Montana. Filming in Montana primarily took place in Paradise Valley. Oscar Ignacio Jiménez serves as the film's cinematographer.

== Release ==
Tokyo Cowboy premiered at the Tallgrass Film Festival in October 2023. Through Purdie Distribution, it had a limited theatrical release in the United States on August 30, 2024.

== Reception ==
=== Critical response ===
The film has an 91% approval rating on the review aggregator Rotten Tomatoes, based on 11 reviews. Writing for World, Bekah McCallum wrote that "Due to the somewhat predictable storyline, the plot strikes a Hallmark-esque tone, but the overall film offers a bit more gravity than other family-friendly flicks. The path to forgiveness isn't straightforward, so the positive ending doesn't come across as wholly unrealistic."

Writing for the Japan Times, Roland Kelts wrote that Tokyo Cowboy "is charming and beautifully shot", calling the film "a refreshing, transcultural role-reversal drama". Writing for CineGods, Ray Greene stated "An art film that's also a crowdpleaser, Tokyo Cowboy has a big heart, and deserves any audience it finds."

=== Box office ===
The film has grossed $269,625, with $149,575 coming from its domestic release and $120,050 coming from international markets.

=== Accolades ===
In its film festival run, Tokyo Cowboy was a winner at the Tallgrass, Boston, Sedona, and St. Louis International Film Festivals.
