= Man from Reno (film) =

- Film poster
- Directed by: Dave Boyle
- Written by: Dave Boyle; Joel Clark; Michael Lerman
- Produced by: Ko Mori; Taro Goto; Frederic Delmais; Nelson Cheng; Timothy Wenhold; Wade Winningham; Emily Ting; Michael Lerman; Alex Verba; Ben Lyon
- Starring: Ayako Fujitani; Pepe Serna; Kazuki Kitamura
- Cinematography: Richard Wong
- Edited by: Dave Boyle; Sean Gillane; Yasu Inoue
- Music by: Micah Dahl Anderson
- Production company: Eleven Arts
- Distributed by: Gravitas Ventures
- Release dates: June 15, 2014 (Los Angeles Film Festival); March 27, 2015 (US)
- Running time: 110 minutes
- Country: United States
- Languages: English; Japanese
- Box office: $101,438

Man from Reno is a 2014 neo-noir crime drama film directed by Dave Boyle and starring Ayako Fujitani, Pepe Serna and Kazuki Kitamura.

== Plot ==
A small-town sheriff, Paul Del Moral accidentally runs into and knocks down a man late at night on an isolated road. A best-selling Japanese crime novelist, Aki Akahori, has a one-night stand with a mysterious man who suddenly disappears. The two stories eventually dovetail. Furthermore, endangered turtles, cold blooded murders, a night of heated passion, deceit, paparazzi, secrets, a professional impostor, and a rich Brit and his burly henchmen are involved in this baffling mystery plot.

== Cast ==
- Ayako Fujitani as Aki
- Pepe Serna as Paul Del Moral
- Kazuki Kitamura as Akira
- Yasuyo Shiba as Junko
- Hiroshi Watanabe as Hitoshi
- Tetsuo Kuramochi as Shinsuke
- Yuki Matsuzaki as Tsubasa
- Shiori Ideta as Chika
- Elisha Skorman as Teresa Del Moral
- Masami Kosaka as Tatsuji
- Rome Kanda as Kageyama
- Ross Turner as Doctor
- Derrick O'Connor as Stephen Luft
- Thomas Cokenias as Bald Man
- Geo Epsilanty as Porter
- Ron Eliot as Desk clerk
