= James Kyson =

South Korean and American actor (born 1975)

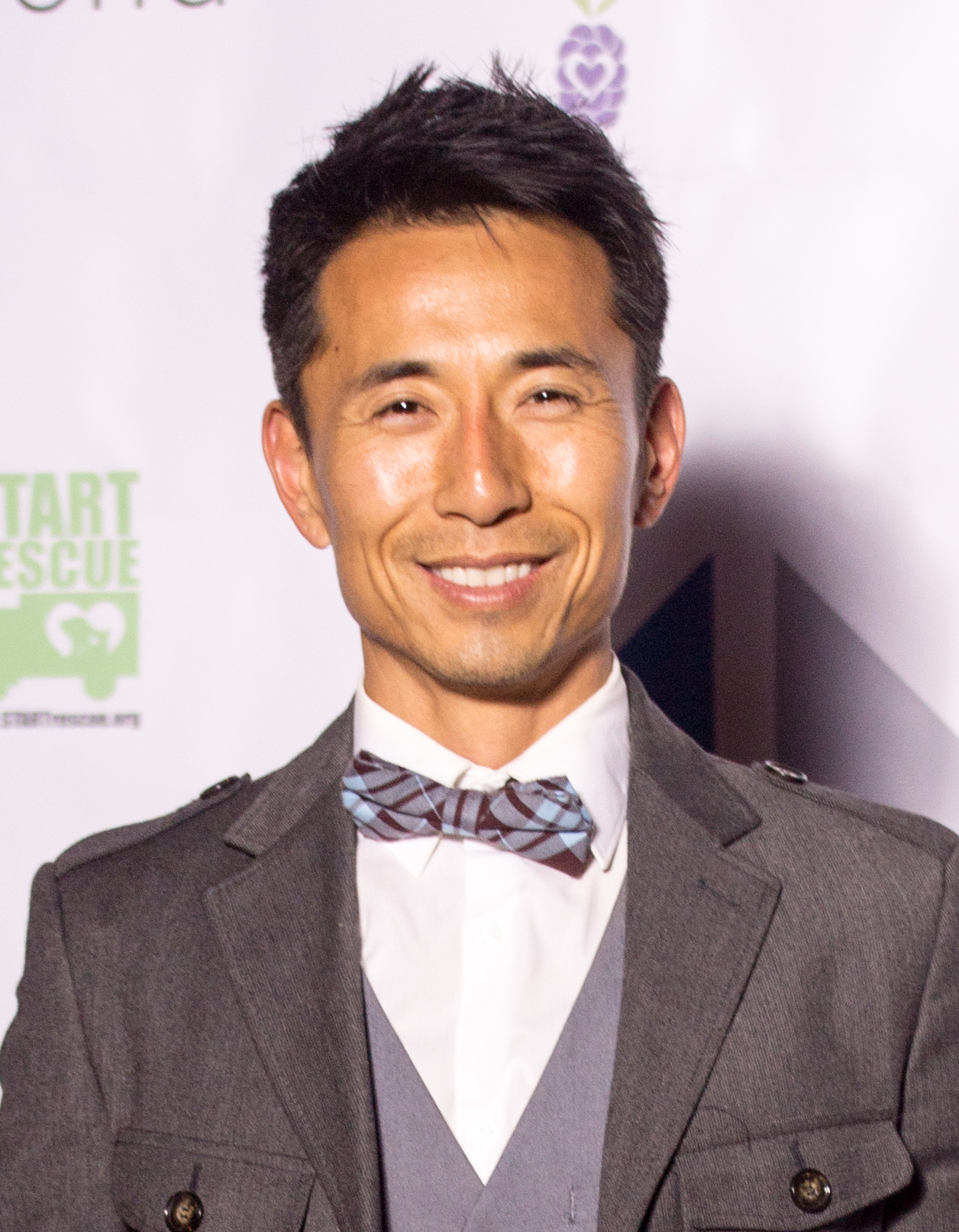
- Kyson at the opening of the Animal Museum in December 2016
- Born: Kim Ji-hoon; December 12, 1975 (age 50); Seoul, South Korea
- Other name: James Kyson Lee
- Citizenship: South Korea; United States
- Education: Boston University; New England Institute of Art
- Occupation: Actor
- Years active: 2003–present
- Spouse: Jamee Mae Berg (m. 2015)
- Children: 2

Korean name
- Hangul: 이재혁
- RR: I Jaehyeok
- MR: I Chaehyŏk

Birth name
- Hangul: 김지훈
- RR: Gim Jihun
- MR: Kim Chihun

Lee Jae-hyeok (Korean: 이재혁, born Kim Ji-hoon [김지훈]; 12 December 1975), known professionally as James Kyson, is a South Korean and American actor, best known for his television work. Best known for his role as Ando Masahashi on the NBC television series Heroes, his guest appearances on television series include Hawaii Five-0, NCIS: Los Angeles, Sleepy Hollow, Elementary, and Criminal Minds: Beyond Borders. Earlier in his career, Kyson was credited as James Kyson Lee or James Kyson-Lee.

== Early life and education ==
Kyson was born Kim Ji-hoon (although his given name was later changed to Jae-hyeok) in Seoul, South Korea. His father was an electrical engineer. He moved with his family to New York City at age 10, where he later attended The Bronx High School of Science. His English name, James, is derived from James Bond. He studied communications at Boston University with the intent of being a sports broadcaster before later transferring to the New England Institute of Art.

In summer of 2001, Kyson sold his car and bought a one-way ticket to Los Angeles with the intent of entering the acting industry. He enrolled in performing arts classes at a community college while auditioning for roles and working as a SAT tutor to pay the bills.

== Acting career ==
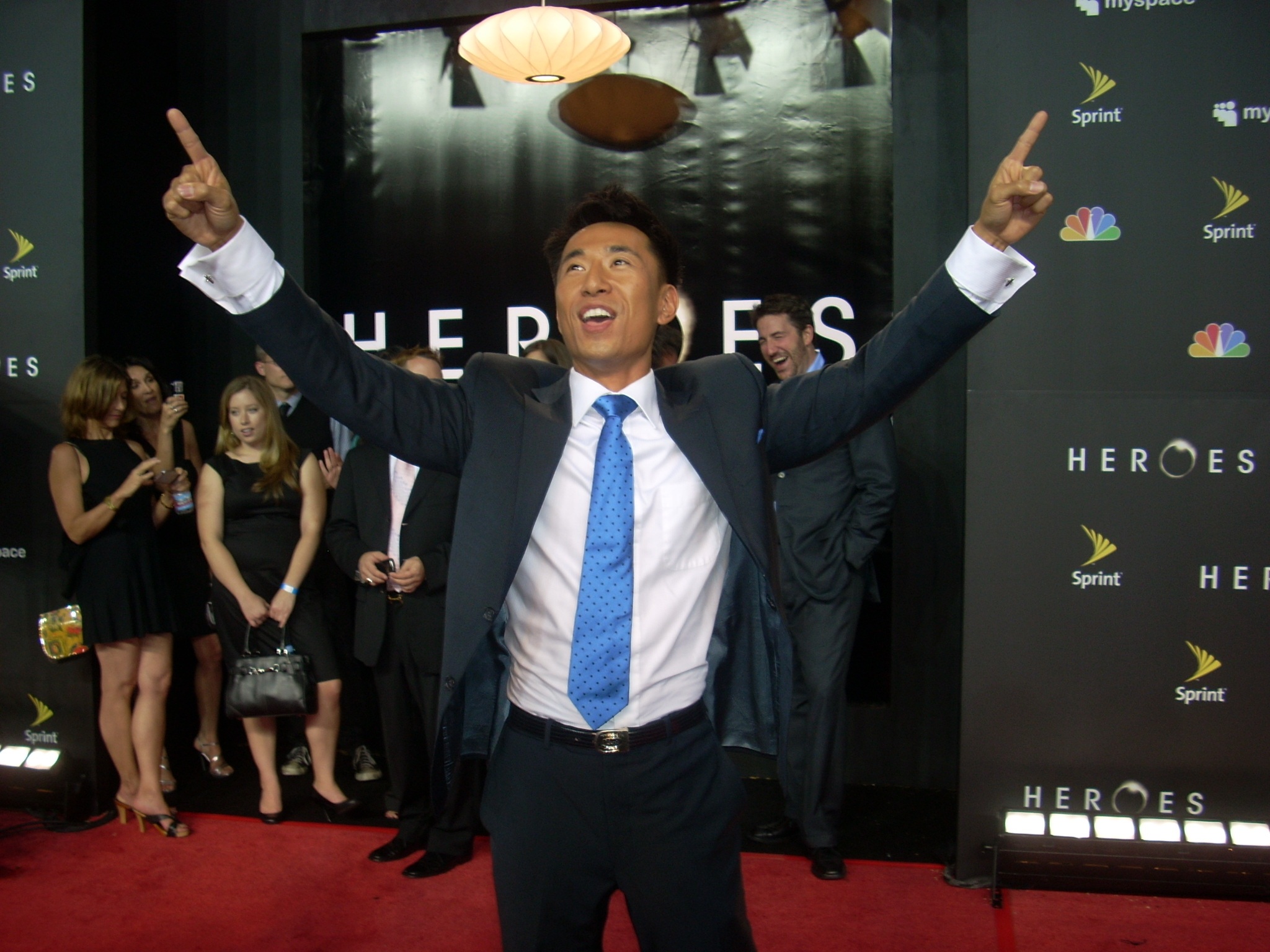
Kyson at the premiere of Heroes

After three years in Los Angeles, Kyson landed his first acting role on the military legal television drama JAG in 2003.

He landed guest roles in hit network television series The West Wing and CSI: Crime Scene Investigation amongst others before being cast as one of his more widely known roles, Ando Masahashi in the sci-fi series Heroes. The role required him to speak Japanese. He later stated that he had taken a semester of Japanese in college and did not find learning the language difficult as it was grammatically similar to Korean, in which he is fluent.

Since Heroes ended, he also guest-starred on Hawaii Five-0, Justified, Animals., Sleepy Hollow, Elementary, and more recently Criminal Minds: Beyond Borders.

His feature films work includes the romantic comedy Another Time, the thriller The Livingston Gardener – and as a mixed martial arts fighter in the action feature Banana Season.

== Other activities ==
Kyson plays basketball for charity celebrity team The Hollywood Knights and participated in Robbie Williams' Soccer Aid for UNICEF at Manchester United's Old Trafford in England. He is also an Ambassador for the International Organization Good Neighbors and their Water for Life campaign.

Kyson represented the Rest of the World team in 2010 Soccer Aid, a British charity soccer match in aid of UNICEF.

Kyson was a celebrity judge at the Miss Universe 2007 beauty pageant.

== Personal life ==
Kyson has been married to singer and neuroscientist Jamee Kyson (née Berg) since 2015.

He is fluent in Korean and learned Japanese to play Ando Masahashi in Heroes.

== Filmography ==
=== Film ===
Year	Title	Role	Notes
2006	Asian Stories	Jim Lee	
2006	Big Dreams Little Tokyo	Murakami	
2007	Doberman	Johnny the Bartender	
2008	Shutter	Ritsuo	
2008	Akira's Hip Hop Shop	Akira	
2009	White on Rice	Tim Kim	
2009	Hard Breakers	Evan	
2009	Necrosis	Jerry	
2009	How to Make Love to a Woman	Aaron	
2009	WWII in HD	Jimmie Kanaya (voice)	
2009	Why Am I Doing This?	Eric	
2010	Despicable Me	Additional voices	
2013	Plush	Coat, Tie Fan	
2014	Ragamuffin	Matt Gast	
2015	Fourth World	Legion	
2015	The Livingston Gardener	Pierce Lawrence	
2016	Convenience Store Diet	Jacked Bro (voice)	
2017	Boone: the Bounty Hunter	Cameo	
2017	No Trace	Detective Phil Chung	
2017	The High Life	Chevy Lee	
2018	Another Time	Kal	
2018	Breaking & Exiting	Peter	
2018	Banana Season	Sun	
2019	Walk to Vegas	Wing	
2023	Godzilla Minus One	Yōji Akitsu (voice)	English dub
2024	Werewolves	Miles Chen	
2025	KPop Demon Hunters	Additional voices	

=== Television ===
Year	Title	Role	Notes
2003	JAG	Lieutenant Pak	Episode: "Close Quarters"
2003	All About the Andersons	Josh	Episode: "Joe's Big Break"
2004	Threat Matrix	Vargas Killer	Episode: "PPX"
2004	Unsolved History	Mysterious Man	Episode: "Flight KAL-007"
2004	The West Wing	Chinese Translator Zheng	Episode: "Impact Winter"
2005	Xtreme Fakeovers	James Parker	Episode: "Xtreme Fakeover"
2005–06	Untold Stories of the E.R.	X-Ray Doctor, Reenactments, Resident Park	3 episodes
2006	Stranger Adventures	Mysterious Man	Episode: "Helen Beaumont"
2006	Heist	Universal Studio Guide	Episode: "Ladies and Gentlemen... Sweaty Dynamite"
2006–10	Heroes	Ando Masahashi	61 episodes
2007	Las Vegas	Joon Ho Park	Episode: "Wagers of Sin"
2008	CSI: Crime Scene Investigation	Officer Kwan	Episode: "Say Uncle"
2009	Star Runners	Lei Chen	Television film
2011	Hawaii Five-0	Sean Leung	Episode: "Ma Ke Kahakai (Shore)"
2012	Chasing the Hill	Curt Barboa	Episode: "Send in the Dancing Chihuahuas"
2012	Daybreak	Gregg Harding	Episode: "Chapter 1"
2012	Have You Met Miss Jones?	Jacob	3 episodes
2012; 2016	Adventure Time	Trami, Big Destiny (voices)	3 episodes
2013	Very Smart Brothers	Marcus	Television film
2013	Armed Response	Charlie Scortino	
2013	Non-Stop	Kevin	Television
2013	Between Bullets	Johnny Parker	3 episodes
2014	Justified	Yoon	2 episodes
2015	The Startup	Mikio	Episode: "Welcome to LA"
2016	Animals	Floor Manager (voice)	Episode: "Rats"
2016	NCIS: Los Angeles	James Kang	Episode: "Seoul Man"
2016	School of Rock	David Kwon	Episode: "We're Not Gonna Take It"
2017	Blade of Honor	John 'Hoss' O'Tekjac	Episode: "Frying Pan"
2017	Sleepy Hollow	Mark Wong	Episode: "Columbia"
2017	Elementary	Joey Ng	Episode: "Rekt in Real Life"
2017	Criminal Minds: Beyond Borders	Detective Joon-Ho Kim	Episode: "Pretty Like Me"
2017	Preacher	The Technician	Episode: "Sokoasha"
2017; 2019	We Bare Bears	Additional Voices (voices)	2 episodes
2018	Glimpse	Scientist Schulze	Episode: "Sebastian Moller"
2018–19	Star vs. the Forces of Evil	Bam Ui Pati Actor, Additional Voices (voices)	2 episodes
2020	Film Lab Presents	Theodore	2 episodes
2020	Lovecraft Country	Byung-Ho	Episode: "Meet Me in Daegu"
2020	Next	Bill Zhai	Episode: "FILE #7"
2023	Scavengers Reign	John (voice)	Episode: "The Mountain"
2023–25	Adventure Time: Fionna and Cake	Big Destiny, Handbag Helmet (voices)	2 episodes
2024	BMF	Officer Kang	5 episodes
2026	Wylde Pak	Security Guard (voice)	Episode: "The Real Woori World/The Collector"

=== Video games ===
Year	Title	Role	Notes
2004	Shellshock: Nam '67	Monty, Vietnamese Soldiers, Prisoners and Civilians #4	
2006	Family Guy Video Game!	Train Conductor	
2007	The Darkness	Cop, Peter Chen	
2008	Mortal Kombat vs. DC Universe	Shang Tsung	
2013	Grand Theft Auto V	The Local Population	
2014	Call of Duty: Advanced Warfare	Additional Voices	
2015	Battlefield Hardline	Additional Voices	
2019	Anthem	Dr. Harken	
2020	Cyberpunk 2077	Additional Voices	
2025	Death Stranding 2: On the Beach	Samson Hook	
2025	Ghost of Yōtei	Additional Voices	

== See also ==
- Masi Oka — Kyson's co-actor on Heroes
