= San Diego Asian Film Festival =

Annual film festival in San Diego, CA

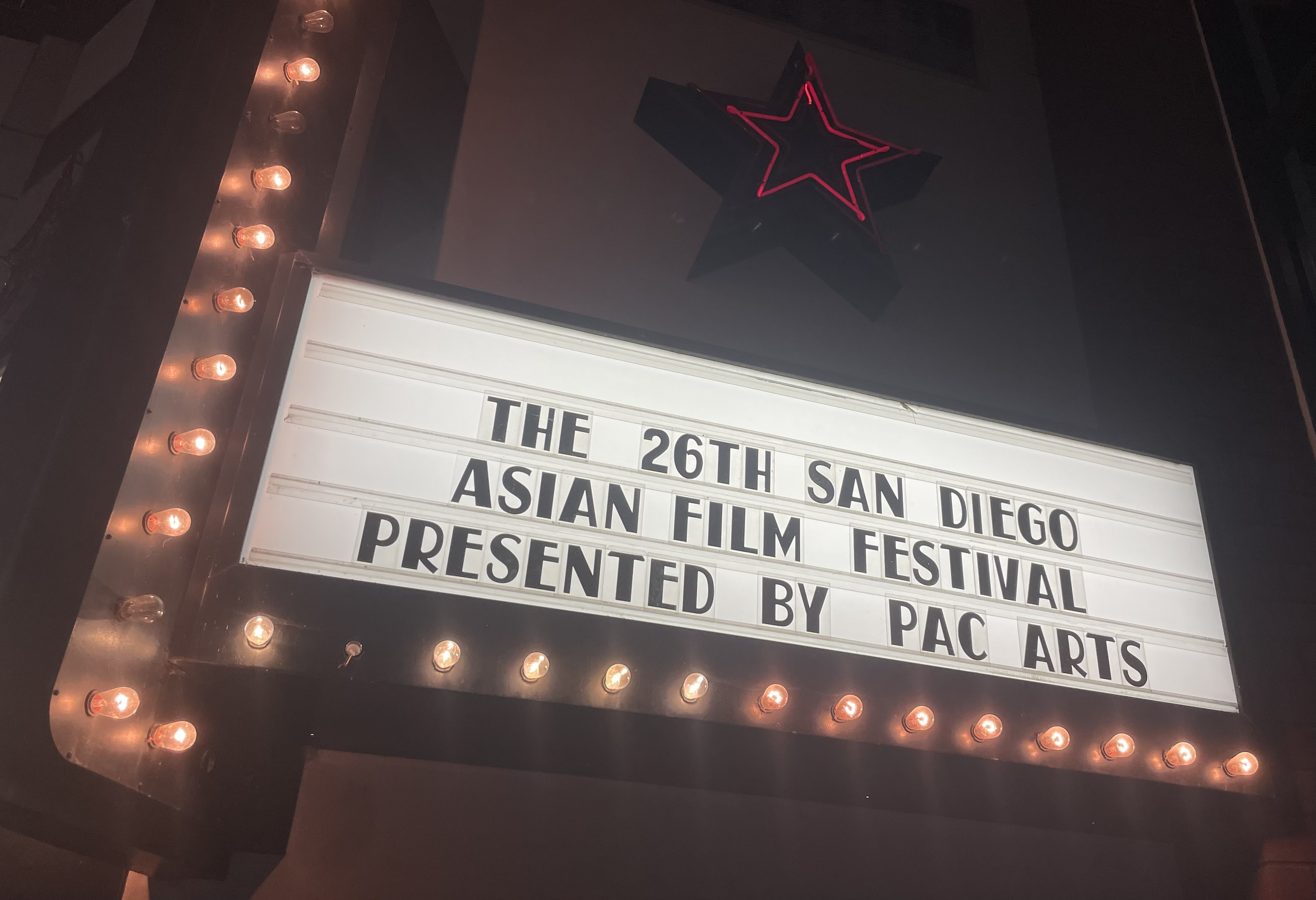
- Marquee for the 26th edition of the festival
- Location: San Diego, California, United States
- Founded: 2000; 26 years ago
- Language: International
- Website: pacarts.org

The San Diego Asian Film Festival (SDAFF) is an annual film festival in San Diego, California, organized by Pacific Arts Movement. It place every November.

== Background ==
SDAFF is the flagship event for the non-profit organization Pacific Arts Movement (Pac-Arts, formerly the San Diego Asian Film Foundation), which also puts on several other arts and culture events throughout the year. The mission of Pacific Arts Movement is to present Pan Asian media arts to San Diego residents and visitors in order to inspire, entertain and support a more compassionate society. Throughout the year, Pacific Arts Movement offers student internships, cultural literacy programs with local high schools and colleges, and a high school filmmaker project entitled "Reel Voices." Pacific Arts Movement also teams up with several movie production and marketing companies to promote both independent and mainstream films that are inline with the mission of the organization.

== History ==
SDAFF found its inception in August 2000 when it was first organized as a fundraiser by the Asian American Journalists Association. After receiving numerous film entries, both domestically and internationally, and seeing sold out crowds at its inaugural festival, Lee Ann Kim, the founding director, saw the potential of making SDAFF an organizational entity of its own. Kim teamed up with several journalists, writers, filmmakers, and community leaders to turn the film festival into the larger non-profit organization that Pacific Arts Movement is today. Since then, the org and SDAFF have consistently grown in size and recognition with each passing year.

In 2025 the San Diego Asian Film Festival is a large international event that shows about 150 movies from 30 countries over ten days. The festival is famous for its wide mix of films, intentionally putting challenging art-house movies and works from "Masters" alongside fun, popular films like the yearly Mystery Kung Fu Theater. The movies shown range from experimental pieces like "Debut, or, Objects of the Field of Debris" to a newly restored version of the classic Bollywood comedy "Andaz Apna Apna," and a new film by master director Lav Diaz. You can see the films at different places in San Diego, including the La Paloma Theatre, UltraStar Mission Valley at Hazard Center, and the UC San Diego Price Center.

== Awards presented ==
=== Lifetime Achievement Award ===
This high honor has been given to Joan Chen, Kieu Chin, George Takei, Soon-Tek Oh, Nancy Kwan, Chung Chang-wha, Tyrus Wong and Wayne Wang.

=== George C. Lin Emerging Filmmaker Award ===
Named for a founding member of the DC Asian Pacific American Film Festival who became Program Director of SDAFF in 2003 until his untimely death after a long battle with cancer in 2008. The award is given to first time, new or otherwise emerging directors.

Past recipients of the award have included Andrew Ahn, Takeshi Fukunaga, Patrick Wang and Nadine Truong among others.

=== Digital Pioneer Award ===
Recipients have included Phil Yu, BuzzFeed Motion Pictures and Anna Akana.

=== Audience Award ===
Recipients have included Island Soldier, Tyrus, Limited Partnership, American Revolutionary: The Evolution of Grace Lee Boggs and White on Rice, among others.

== Annual Spring Showcase ==
The Annual Spring Showcase, introduced in 2011 is a smaller festival than SDAFF, featuring around a dozen films each year. Notable films

- 2011 Little Big Soldier - inaugural opening night film
- 2012 Sunny - opening night film
- 2013 Linsanity - opening night film
- 2014 To Be Takei - won the audience award at the 4th Annual Spring Showcase
- 2015 In Football We Trust - opening night film
- 2016 The Music of Strangers: Yo-Yo Ma and the Silk Road Ensemble - opening night film/audience award winner
- 2017 Gook - closing night film
- 2018 Minding the Gap (Oscar Nominee) - official selection
- 2019 First Night Nerves (Stanley Kwan) - opening night film
- 2020 No event held
- 2021 The Way We Keep Dancing - opening night film
- 2022 Anita - opening night film
- 2023 Starring Jerry as Himself - opening night film

== Reel Voices ==
Each year since 2005, Pacific Arts Movement offers students from local San Diego schools the chance to join this 12-week film internship program. The program accepts around 10 students per year. Students are paired with a mentor and helped to compose a nonfiction documentary film by the Reel Voices staff and volunteers. The final product is screened at SDAFF where the students participate in a Q&A session after the showing.

In 2014, Reel Voices expanded programs to launch a media arts elective class at Monarch School in San Diego's Barrio Logan for high school students interested in film production and digital storytelling.

== Venues ==
Most of SDAFF's film screenings occur at the Hazard Center UltraStar Cinemas in Mission Valley, but some events have taken place at other locations such as UC San Diego, Digital Gym Cinema and the Museum of Contemporary Art San Diego.
