= Ayako Fujitani =

Japanese-American writer and actress

- 藤谷 文子
- Born: Ayako Faith Fujitani; 7 December 1979 (age 46); Osaka, Japan
- Other name: Ayako Seagal
- Occupations: Actress, writer
- Years active: 1995–present
- Spouse: Javier Gullón
- Children: 2
- Parents: Steven Seagal (father); Miyako Fujitani (mother)

Ayako Fujitani (藤谷 文子, Fujitani Ayako; born 7 December 1979) is a Japanese-American actress and writer. She acts and writes in both Japanese and English.

== Early life ==
Ayako Faith Fujitani was born in Osaka, Japan. She is the daughter of Steven Seagal by his first wife, aikido master Miyako Fujitani. Her parents separated when she was about eight years old. She lived in Los Angeles during her teen years.

== Career ==
=== Acting ===
Fujitani made her cinematic debut at age 15 starring in the 1995 cult classic Gamera: Guardian of the Universe directed by Shusuke Kaneko. She reprised her role in subsequent films in the series and also featured in an episode of Ultraman Max. In 2000, she played the lead role in the movie Shiki-Jitsu. In 2008, she played the role of Hiroko in the anthology film Tokyo!, directed by Leos Carax, Bong Joon-Ho and Michel Gondry. She also featured in the indie romance Daylight Savings with the supporting role of "Goh" Nakamura's ex-girlfriend, Mozart in the Jungle and The Last Ship. Other film roles include parts in Sansa and Man from Reno.

=== Writing ===
Fujitani has contributed film reviews to the Japanese magazine Roadshow, and has published several coupled novellas, including Touhimu (Flee-Dream), which was adapted into the film Shiki-Jitsu by writer and director Hideaki Anno. She has also published Yakeinu (Burnt Dog), a novella. Fujitani has written both fiction and non-fiction, contributing essays and short stories to various national publications.

In 2014, Fujitani co-wrote a short film commissioned by Ermenegildo Zegna Group, entitled A Rose Reborn. The film was directed by Park Chan-wook, Chung Chung-hoon and Michael Werwie, and scored by Clint Mansell. It starred Jack Huston and Daniel Wu.

=== Other pursuits ===
At age 12, she won the Asian Beauty Contest, held in honor of the Japanese release of the film Police Story 3, kick starting her modeling career.

In 2006, she directed a short drama for TV Tokyo's Drama Factory program.

== Filmography ==
=== Film ===
Year	Title	Role	Notes
1995	Gamera: Guardian of the Universe	Asagi Kusanagi	
1996	Gamera 2: Attack of Legion	Asagi Kusanagi	
1996	Musashi		
1998	The Patriot	McClaren's Assistant	
1999	Gamera 3: Revenge of Iris	Asagi Kusanagi	
2000	Pyrokinesis	Waitress	
2000	Shiki-Jitsu	She	
2003	Sansa	June	
2005	Ikusa		
2007	Kyaputen Tokio	Cafe Gal Owner	
2008	Tokyo!	Hiroko	
2008	Death of Domomata	Hamada	
2012	Daylight Savings	Erika	
2012	A Chorus of Angels	Kaori Ando	
2013	The Doors	Tub Girl	Short film
2014	Man from Reno	Aki	
2015	The Lion Standing in the Wind	Sakoto Kojima	
2015	Hee	Mrs. Sanada	
2020	I Will Make You Mine	Erika	
2023	Tokyo Cowboy	Keiko Masuda	
2026	Karateka		Spanish film

=== Television ===
Year	Title	Role	Notes
2005	Ultraman Max	Yuri Sakata	Episode: "Prophecy of Baradhi"
2010	Atami no Sousakan	Mio Shikishima	
2010	FACE MAKER	Haruka Shiina	2 episodes
2016	The Last Ship	Kyoko	7 episodes
2018	Mozart in the Jungle	Yuki	2 episodes
