= List of San Diego Asian Film Festival award winners =

The following is a list of San Diego Asian Film Festival winners by year.

== 2025 - 26th Annual ==
November 6–15, 2025

=== Award Winners ===
- Grand Jury Prize - Fucktoys (dir. Annapurna Sriram)
- Best Documentary Feature - The Gas Station Attendant (dir. Karla Murthy)
- Best Narrative Feature - Debut, or, Objects of the Field of Debris as Currently Catalogued (dir. Julian Castronovo)
- Best Documentary Short - We Were the Scenery (dir. Christopher Radcliff)
- Best Narrative Short - We Used to Take the Long Way Home (dir. An Nguyen)
- Best Experimental Short - Eavesdropping on Jason Sato’s Brothers (dir. Nguyen Tan Hoang)
- Special Jury Prize - A Brighter Summer Day for the Lady Avengers (dir. Birdy Wei-Ting Hung)
- George C. Lin Emerging Filmmaker Award - Lucky Lu (dir. Lloyd Lee Choi)
- Best International Short - Water Sports (dir. Whammy Alcazaren)
- Audience Award - The Rose: Come Back to Me (dir. Eugene Yi)

== 2024 - 25th Annual ==
November 7–16, 2024

=== Award Winners ===
- Grand Jury Award - Light of the Setting Sun (dir. Vicky Du)
- Best Narrative Feature - Moloka'i Bound (dir. Alika Tengan)
- Best Documentary Feature - Standing Above the Clouds (dir. Jalena Keane-Lee)
- Best Narrative Short - Myself When I Am Real (dir. Angeline Gragasin)
- Best Documentary Short - Wouldn't Make It Any Other Way (dir. Hao Zhou)
- Best Experimental Short - I Would've Been Happy (dir. Jordan Wong)
- International Short - The Inescapable Desire of Roots (dir. Mark Chua and Lam Li Shuen)
- Special Jury Mention All That We Love (dir. Yen Tan)
- Emerging Filmmaker Award - History as Hypnosis (dir. Alison Nguyen)
- Audience Award Winner - Home Court (dir. Erica Tanamachi)

=== Notable Events and Appearances ===
- Notable Films: international premiere of Cells at Work! live action film, world premiere of Tura Satana documentary

== 2023 - 24th Annual ==
November 2–11, 2023

=== Award Winners ===
- Grand Jury Award - When You Left Me On That Boulevard (dir. Kayla Abuda Galang)
- Best Narrative Feature - Egghead & Twinkie (dir. Sarah Kambe Holland)
- Best Documentary Feature - Rally (dir. Rooth Tang)
- Best Narrative Short - Invasive Species (dir. Annie Ning)
- Best Documentary Short - Tracing History (dir. Jalena Keane-Lee)
- Best Experimental Short - Teetering Graphite (dir. Cherlyn Hsing-Hsin Liu)
- International Short - Primetime Mother (dir. Sonny Calvento)
- Special Jury Mention Through Sunless Ways (dir. Kira Dane, Katelyn Rebelo)
- Emerging Filmmaker Award - Divine Factory (dir. Joseph Mangat)
- Audience Award Winner - Wonderland (dir. Chai Yee Wei)

=== Notable Events and Appearances ===
- Notable Films: Monster, Elegies with Ann Hui in attendance

== 2022 - 23rd Annual ==
November 3–12, 2022

=== Award Winners ===
- Grand Jury Award - Wisdom Gone Wild (dir. Rea Tajiri)
- Best Narrative Feature - Riceboy Sleeps (dir. Anthony Shim)
- Best Documentary Feature - Bad Axe (dir. David Siev)
- Best Narrative Short - Last Hawaiian Sugar (dir. Déjà Cresencia Bernhardt)
- Best Documentary Short - In Loving Memory (of Who We Used to Be) (dir. Vicky Lee)
- Best Experimental Short - Declarations of Love (dir. Tiff Rekem)
- International Short - Will You Look at Me (dir. Shuli Huang)
- Special Jury Mention - Lucky Fish (dir. Emily May Jampel)
- Emerging Filmmaker Award - Liquor Store Dreams (dir. So Yum Um)
- Audience Award Winner - Riceboy Sleeps (dir. Anthony Shim)

=== Notable Events and Appearances ===
- Notable Films: A Confucian Confusion 4K restoration, No Bears

== 2021 - 22nd Annual ==
October 28 to November 6, 2021

=== Award Winners ===
- Grand Jury Award - I Was A Simple Man (dir. Christopher Makoto Yogi)
- Best Narrative Feature - 7 Days (dir. Roshan Sethi)
- Best Documentary Feature - Manzanar Diverted: When Water Becomes Dust (dir. Ann Kaneko)
- Best Narrative Short - Americanized (dir. Erica Eng)
- Best Documentary Short - An Uninterrupted View of the Sea (dir. Mika Yatsuhashi)
- Best Experimental Short - Rumi and his Roses (dir. Navid Sinaki)
- International Short - Lemongrass Girl (dir. Pom Bunsermvicha)
- Special Jury Mention - To Live Here (dir. Melanie Dang Ho)
- Emerging Filmmaker Award - Never Rest/Unrest (dir. Tiffany Sia)
- Audience Award Winner - Like a Rolling Stone: The Life and Times of Ben Fong-Torres (dir. Suzanne Joe Kai)

=== Notable Events and Appearances ===
- Notable Films: Catch the Fair One, Drive My Car
- Special Sections: Asian-American Panorama, Asia Pop!, Masters, Classics Restored, Taiwan Film Showcase

== 2020 - 21st Annual ==
October 23–31, 2020

=== Award Winners ===
- Grand Jury Award - Mizuko (Water Child) (dir. Katelyn Rebelo, Kira Dane)
- Best Narrative Feature - Mogul Mowgli (Bassam Tariq)
- Best Documentary Feature - The Donut King (Alice Gu)
- Best Narrative Short - Thank You, Come Again (Nirav Bhakta)
- Best Documentary Short - I Bought a Time Machine (Yeon Park)
- Best Animated Short - Felt Love (Angeline Vu and Arlene Bongco)
- International Short - Red Aninsri; or, Tiptoeing on the Still Trembling Berlin Wall (Ratchapoom Boonbunchachoke)
- Special Jury Mention - Finding Yingying (Jiayan “Jenny” Shi)
- George C. Lin Emerging Filmmaker Award - Stray (Elizabeth Lo)
- Audience Award Winner - Down a Dark Stairwell (Ursula Lang)

=== Notable Events and Appearances ===
- Notable Films: 76 Days, Mogul Mowgli
- Special Events (Pandemic Specials): Virtual Cinema options, Drive-In Movies, Q&As on Twitch, 16mm x Twitch, Mystery Kung Fu Theater, Taiwan Showcase, Virtual Lobby on Animal Crossing

== 2019 - 20th Annual ==
November 7–16, 2019

=== Award Winners ===
- Grand Jury Award - Straight Up (James Sweeney)
- Best Narrative Feature - Driveways (Andrew Ahn)
- Best Documentary Feature - The Cancer Journals, Revisited (Lana Lin)
- Best Narrative Short - First (Micaela Durand & Daniel Chew)
- Best Documentary Short - My American Surrogate (Leslie Tai)
- Best Animated Short - Umbilical (Danski Tang)
- International Short - Grand Bouquet (Nao Yoshigai)
- Special Jury Mention - Jaddoland (Nadia Shihab)
- George C. Lin Emerging Filmmaker Award - No Data Plan (Miko Revereza)
- Audience Award Winner - Yellow Rose (Diane Paragas)

=== Notable Events and Appearances ===
- Opening Night Film: The Paradise We Are Looking For
- Centerpiece: Straight Up
- Closing Night: To Live to Sing

Special Events: Taiwan Film Showcase, Spotlight on Tibet

=== 9th Spring Showcase ===
April 11–18, 2019

- Opening Night Film: First Night Nerves
- Closing Night Film: Ek Ladki Ko Dekha Toh Aisa Laga
- Notable Films: Memories of My Body, Swing Kids, Song Lang, The Crossing
- Special Events: From the Claws of Darkness: Restoring Philippine Cinema, Mystery Kung Fu Theater

== 2018 - 19th Annual ==
November 8–17, 2018

=== Award Winners ===
- Grand Jury Award: June
- Best Narrative Feature: Bitter Melon
- Best Documentary Feature: Blowin' Up
- Best Narrative Short: First Generation
- Best Documentary Short: Nai Nai
- Best International Short: Babylon
- Best Animated Short: Yoko
- Special Jury Mention: Origin Story
- George C. Lin Emerging Filmmaker Award: August at Akiko's (dir. Christopher Makoto Yogi)
- Lifetime Achievement Award: Marcus Hu
- Audience Award: One Cut of the Dead

=== Notable Events and Appearances ===
- Notable Films: Little Forest, Inventing Tomorrow, Ramen Shop
- HBO Preview: Folklore

=== 8th Spring Showcase ===
April 19–26, 2018

- Opening Night Film: Meditation Park
- Closing Night Film: Kusama: Infinity
- Notable Films: Minding the Gap, Love Education, Mukshin, The Third Murder,
- Special Presentations: Falling for Angels: the Films of Yasmin Ahmad

== 2017 - 18th Annual ==
November 9–18, 2017

=== Award Winners ===
- Grand Jury Award: My Enemy My Brother, directed by Ann Shin
- Narrative Feature: Wexford Plaza, directed by Joyce Wong
- Documentary Feature: Out of State, directed by Ciara Lacy
- Narrative Short: Float, directed by Tristan Seniuk & Voleak Sip
- Documentary Short: Mother’s Day, directed by Elizabeth Lo & R.J. Lozada
- Animated Short: Crushed in Spaces, directed by Janice Chun
- International Short: Afternoon Clouds, directed by Payal Kapadia
- Special Jury Mention: Santa Claus, directed by Jeff Man
- Digital Pioneer Award: Angry Asian Man, directed by Phil Yu
- George C. Lin Emerging Filmmaker Award: Anahita Ghazvinizadeh, director of They
- Audience Award: Island Soldier, directed by Nathan Fitch

=== Notable Events and Appearances ===
- Notable Films: Oh Lucy!, A Better Man, The Villainess, Columbus and Newton.
- Musical performance by actress/singer Tia Carrere.
- Potluck Collective Podcasts: Saturday School, the Fresh Creatives and They Call Us Bruce.
- Classic Films Restored: Shopping for Fangs (1997), Pigsy Eats Watermelon (1958) and The Little Sisters of the Grassland (1965).
- Mystery Kung Fu Theater

=== 7th Spring Showcase ===
April 20–27, 2017

- Notable Films: Gook, An Insignificant Man, The Long Excuse, Sunday Beauty Queen, Window Horses
- Special Presentations: “Right to Resist: From 9066 to 2017” featuring four documentary films and four shorts about political resistance.
- Audience Award: Abacus: Small Enough to Jail

== 2016 - 17th Annual ==
November 3–12, 2016

=== Award Winners ===
- Grand Jury Award: The Lockpicker, directed by Randall Okita
- Narrative Feature: Chee and T, directed by Tanuj Chopra
- Documentary Feature: Bad Rap, directed by Salima Koroma
- Narrative Short: Death in a Day, directed by Lin Wang
- Documentary Short: Bruce Takes Dragon Town, directed by Emily Chao
- Animated Short: Hold Me (Ca Caw Ca Caw), directed by Renee Zhan
- Special Jury Mention: Random Acts of Legacy, directed by Ali Kazimi
- George C. Lin Emerging Filmmaker Award: Andrew Ahn, director of Spa Night
- Lifetime Achievement Award: Wayne Wang
- Audience Award: Daze of Justice, directed by Michael Siv

=== Notable Events and Appearances ===
- Notable Films: The Tiger Hunter, Mifune: The Last Samurai
- Standup comedy by Actor and Comedian Randall Park (Fresh Off the Boat, Trainwreck, The Interview).
- Panel discussion with The Edge of Seventeen actor Hayden Szeto.

=== 6th Spring Showcase ===
April 28th - May 5th, 2016

- Notable Films: Sweet 20, 3688, Born to Dance, Heart Attack, Honor Thy Father, Right Now, Wrong Then
- Special Presentations: “China Now: Independent Visions” featuring four film programs from works from the Beijing Independent Film Festival.
- Audience Award: The Music of Strangers: Yo-Yo Ma and the Silk Road Ensemble (Morgan Neville)

== 2015 - 16th Annual ==
November 5–14, 2015

=== Award Winners ===
- Grand Jury Award: Distance Between, directed by R.J. Lozada
- Narrative Feature: Crush the Skull, directed by Viet Nguyen
- Documentary Feature: Operation Popcorn, directed by David Grabias
- Narrative Short: Drama, directed by Tian Guan
- Documentary Short: From Tonga, directed by Huay-Bing Law
- Animated Short: Cuz He’s Black, directed by Ji Sub Jeong
- Special Jury Mention: Reunification, directed by Alvin Tsang
- George C. Lin Emerging Filmmaker Award: Takeshi Fukunaga, director of Out of My Hand
- Lifetime Achievement Award: Tyrus Wong
- Audience Award: Tyrus, directed by Pamela Tom
- Digital Pioneer Award: BuzzFeed Motion Pictures

=== Notable Events and Appearances ===
- Notable Films: Miss India America, Seoul Searching, Made in Japan.
- Panel discussion with Ken Jeong.
- Discussion with BuzzFeed producer Eugene Lee Yang.

=== 5th Spring Showcase ===
April 16th-25th, 2015

- Films: Top Spin, Giovanni’s Island, Margarita, With a Straw, Mariquina, My Brilliant Life, The Taking of Tiger Mountain 3D (Tsui Hark), Today
- Special Presentation: Cinema Little Saigon, a retrospective of films and videos by Vietnamese Americans on the occasion of the 40th anniversary of the Fall of Saigon
- Audience Award: Princess Jellyfish

== 2014 - 15th Anniversary ==
Nov 6-14, 2014

=== Award Winners ===
- Grand Jury Award: Appropriate Behavior, directed by Desiree Akhavan
- Narrative Feature: Man from Reno, directed by Dave Boyle
- Documentary Feature: My Life in China, directed by Kenneth Eng
- Narrative Short: Hypebeasts, directed by Jessica dela Merced
- Documentary Short: Transformers: the Premake, directed by Kevin B. Lee
- Animated Short: Behind My Behind, directed by David Chai
- Special Jury Mention: Kumu Hina, directed by Dean Hamer and Joe Wilson
- George C. Lin Emerging Filmmaker Award: Vera Brunner-Sung, director of Bella Vista
- Audience Award: Limited Partnership, directed by Thomas Miller
- Digital Pioneer Award: Anna Akana

=== Notable Events and Appearances ===
- Notable Films: Revenge of the Green Dragons, The Kingdom of Dreams and Madness and Meet the Patels.
- Pilot episode of Fresh Off the Boat screening.
- Taiwan Films Showcase
- Remembering Queer Korea Reception

=== 4th Spring Showcase ===
April 17–24, 2014

- Notable Films: Like Father, Like Son, How to Fight in Six Inch Heels, Miss Granny, The Protector 2, Siddharth, Why Don’t You Play in Hell?
- Special Presentation: Live performances of 18 Mighty Mountain Warriors
- Audience Award Winner: To Be Takei

== 2013 - 14th Annual ==
November 7–16, 2013

=== Award Winners ===
- Grand Jury Award: Karaoke Girl, directed by Visra Vichit-Vadakan
- Narrative Feature: Sake-Bomb, directed by Junya Sakino
- Documentary Feature: Your Day is My Night, directed by Lynne Sachs
- Narrative Short: The Perils of Growing Up Flat-Chested, directed by Yulin Kuang
- Documentary Short: Draft Day, directed by Josh Kim
- Animated Short: The Present, directed by Joe Hsieh
- Special Jury Mention: Documented, directed by Jose Antonio Vargas and Ann Lupo
- Social Justice Award: When I Walk, directed by Jason DaSilva
- George C. Lin Emerging Filmmaker Award: Leslie Tai
- Audience Award: American Revolutionary: The Evolution of Grace Lee Boggs, directed by Grace Lee

=== Notable Events and Appearances ===
- Notable Films: Finding Mr. Right, Blind Detective, Norte: The End of History and Ip Man: The Final Fight.
- Drive-By Cinema screenings of webseries premieres: Night Girls Crew and Flat3.
- Mapping event for wheelchair accessibility with Jason DaSilva.

=== 3rd Spring Showcase ===
April 18–25, 2013

- Opening Night Film: Linsanity
- Closing Night Film: Jab Tak Hai Jaan
- Notable Films: Abigail Harm, Comrade Kim Goes Flying, Kai Po Che, Key of Life, La Source, The Last Supper, Pieta, United Red Army
- Audience Award: Harana

== 2012 - 13th Annual ==
November 1–9, 2012

=== Award Winners ===
- Grand Jury Award: Johnny Loves Dolores, directed by Clarissa de los Reyes
- Narrative Feature: Graceland, directed by Ron Morales
- Documentary Feature: Seeking Asian Female, directed by Debbie Lum
- Narrative Short: Monday Monday, directed by Eric K. Yue
- Animated Short: 38-39°C, directed by Kangmin Kim
- Special Jury Mention: The World Before Her, directed by Nisha Pahuja
- George C. Lin Emerging Filmmaker Award: Ernie Park, director of Late Summer
- Lifetime Achievement Award: Chung Chang-wha

=== Notable Events and Appearances ===
- Notable Films: Don't Stop Believin': Everyman's Journey

=== 2nd Spring Showcase ===
April 19–26, 2012

- Opening Night Film: Sunny
- Closing Night Film: Zindagi Na Milegi Dobara
- Notable Films: The Front Line, Headshot, I Wish, Life Without Principle, My Back Page, Patang (Prashant Bhargava), A Simple Life.

== 2011 - 12th Annual ==
=== Award Winners ===
- Grand Jury Award: Surrogate Valentine, directed by Dave Boyle
- Narrative Feature: In the Family, directed by Patrick Wang
- Documentary Feature: Tales of the Waria, directed by Kathy Huang
- Narrative Short: Andy, directed by Andrew Ahn
- Documentary Short: Making Noise in Silence, directed by Mina T. Son
- Animated Short: Enrique Wrecks the World, directed by David Chai
- Special Jury Mention: The LuLu Session, directed by S. Casper Wong
- George C. Lin Emerging Filmmaker Award: Patrick Wang, director of In the Family
- Lifetime Achievement Award: Nancy Kwan
- Audience Award: The Power of Two, directed by Marc Smolowitz

=== Notable Events and Appearances ===
- Honored Gala Guests: the Board of San Diego County Supervisors, the director of the San Diego Chinese Historical Museum and the Principal of Barnard Mandarin Chinese Magnet School.

=== 1st Spring Showcase ===
April 15–22, 2011

- Opening Night Film: Little Big Soldier (Ding Sheng)
- Closing Night Film: Boy (Taika Waititi)
- Films: Getting Home, Hansel & Gretel, The House of Suh, The Man from Nowhere, One Voice, Patisserie Coin De Rue, Poetry (Lee Chang-dong), Saigon Electric
- Special Presentation: Japan earthquake fundraiser screening of A Tale of Mari & Three Puppies.

== 2010 - 11th Annual ==
=== Award Winners ===
- Grand Jury Award: The House of Suh, directed by Iris Shim
- Narrative Feature: Littlerock, directed by Mike Ott
- Documentary Feature: Finding Face, directed by Skye Fitzgerald and Patti Duncan
- Narrative Short: Works of Art, directed by Andrew Pang
- Documentary Short: Top Spin, directed by Sara Newens and Mina T. Son
- Animated Short: The Wonder Hospital, directed by Beomsik Shimbe Shim
- George C. Lin Emerging Filmmaker Award: Nadine Truong
- Influential Asian American Artist Award: Daniel Dae Kim
- Audience Award: One Voice, directed by Lisette Flannery

=== Notable Events and Appearances ===
- Asian Americans in Hollywood (Panel) - featuring: Ellen Wong, Harry Shum, Aaron Yoo, Jon M. Chu, and CS Lee.

== 2009 - 10th Anniversary ==
=== Award Winners ===
- Grand Jury Award: Children of Invention, directed by Tze Chun
- Narrative Feature: Children of Invention, directed by Tze Chun
- Documentary Feature: Whatever It Takes, directed by Christopher Wong
- Narrative Short: A Green Mountain In a Drawer, directed by Hwa-Jun Lee
- Documentary Short: Rough Cut, directed by Firouzeh Khosrovani
- Animated Short: Kudan, directed by Taku Kimura
- Special Jury Mention: A Song For Ourselves, directed by Tadashi Nakamura
- George C. Lin Emerging Filmmaker Award: Mark Tran, director of All About Dad
- Audience Award: White on Rice, directed by David Boyle

=== Notable Events and Appearances ===
- Notable Screenings: Red Cliff, Afro Samurai Resurrection (TV), Detroit Metal City, Neko Ramen and Vampire Girl Vs. Frankenstein Girl.
- Celebrity Appearances: Margaret Cho, Tamlyn Tomita, and Dante Basco.

== 2008 - 9th Annual ==
=== Award Winners ===
- Grand Jury Award: Dirty Hands: the Art & Crimes of David Choe, directed by Harry Kim
- Narrative Feature: Santa Mesa, directed by Ron Morales
- Documentary Feature: Shame, directed by Mohammed Naqvi
- Narrative Short: Lady, directed by Wendy Cheng
- Animated Short: Meat Days, directed by Joe Hsieh
- Special Jury Mention: Damn the Past!, directed by Julie Kang
- Lifetime Achievement Award: Soon-Tek Oh

=== Notable Events and Appearances ===
- A Celebrity Panel: Asian Americans in Hollywood - featuring: Aaron Yoo, James Kyson Lee, Leonardo Nam, Smith Cho, Sheetal Sheth, and Jimmy Tsai.
- From Comics to Film - featuring: Greg Pak and Jim Lee

== 2007 - 8th Annual ==
=== Award Winners ===
- Grand Jury Award: Cats of Mirikitani, directed by Linda Hattendorf
- Narrative Feature: Owl and the Sparrow, directed by Stephane Gauger
- Documentary Feature: Na Kamalei: The Men of Hula, directed by Lisette Flanary
- Narrative Short: Monsoon, directed by Shyam Balse
- Documentary Short: Mookey’s Story, directed by Carolyn Goossen & Daffodil Altan
- Animated Short: City Paradise, directed by Gaelle Denis
- Music video: Champion by Native Guns, directed by Patricio Ginelsa
- Lifetime Achievement Award: George Takei

== 2006 - 7th Annual ==
=== Award Winners ===
- Grand Jury Award: Journey From the Fall, directed by Ham Tran
- Narrative Feature: Eve & the Firehorse, directed by Julia Kwan
- Documentary Feature: Last Atomic Bomb, directed by Robert Richter
- Narrative Short: Hiro, directed by Matthew Swanson
- Animated Short: Mirage, directed by Youngwoon Jang
- Experimental: Latent Sorrow, directed by Shon Kim
- Music Video: Steal the Blueprints, directed by Chris Deaner
- Special Jury Mention: Colma: The Musical, directed by Richard Wong
- Lifetime Achievement Award: Kieu Chin

== 2005 - 6th Annual ==
=== Award Winners ===
- Grand Jury Award: Seibutsu: (Still Life), directed by Joe Turner Lin
- Narrative Feature: The Motel, directed by Michael Kang
- Documentary Feature: And Thereafter, directed by Hosup Lee
- Narrative Short: Summer of the Serpent, directed by Kimi Takesue
- Documentary Short: Daastar: Defending Sikh Identity, directed by Kevin Lee
- Animated Short: Public Bath, directed by Tak Hoon Kim
- Experimental: 5 x 90: The Wake, directed by Samuel Kiehoon Lee
- Music Video: Psychokinetics: The Vault, directed by Gene Celso
- Visionary Award: Saving Face, directed by Alice Wu
- Lifetime Achievement: Joan Chen

== 2004 - 5th Anniversary ==
=== Award Winners ===
- Grand Jury Award: The Magical Life of Long Tack Sam, directed by Ann Marie Fleming
- Narrative Feature: First Morning, directed by Victor Vu
- Documentary Feature: The Magical Life of Long Tack Sam, directed by Ann Marie Fleming
- Narrative Short: Sangam, directed by Prashant Bhargava
- Documentary Short: Yellow Brotherhood, directed by Tadashi Nakamura
- Animated Short: Birthday Boy, directed by Sejong Park
- Experimental: Balikbayan, directed by Larilyn Sanchez & Riza Manalo
- Music Video: Skyflakes: Bad Thoughts, directed by Dino Ignacio

== 2003 - 4th Annual ==
=== Award Winners ===
- Grand Jury Award: Refugee, directed by Spencer Nakasako
- Narrative Feature: Book of Rules, directed by Sung H. Kim
- Documentary Feature: Sleeping Tigers: The Asahi Baseball Story, directed by Jari Osborne
- Narrative Short: Anniversary, directed by Ham Tran
- Documentary Short: How to Make Kimchee, directed by Samuel Kiehoon Lee
- Animated Short: Henry’s Garden, directed by Moon Seun
- Experimental: Nothing But Love, directed by Wen-Yao Chuang

== 2002 - 3rd Annual ==
=== Award Winners ===
- Grand Jury Award: Sophie, directed by Helen Lee
- Narrative Feature: Charlotte Sometimes, directed by Eric Byler
- Documentary Feature: Journey for Lotus, directed by Eunhee Cha
- Narrative Short: Barrier Device, directed by Grace Lee
- Documentary Short: BLT Genesis, directed by Evan Leong
- Animated Short: Vessel Wrestling, directed by Lisa Yu
- Experimental: Still I Rise, directed by Umesh Shukla

== 2001 - 2nd Annual ==
=== Award Winners ===
- Grand Jury Award: Roads and Bridges, directed by Abraham Lim
- Narrative Feature: Dog Food (Azucena), directed by Carlos Siguion-Reyna
- Documentary Feature: Made in China, directed by Karin Lee
- Narrative Short: Talk to Taka, directed by Richard Kim
- Documentary Short: Bitter and Sweet, directed by Johanna Lee
- Animated Short: Lint People, directed by Helder Sun
- Experimental: Staccato Fugue, directed by Teo Carlo Pulgar

== 2000 - Festival Launch ==
=== Award Winners ===
- Grand Jury Award: Karma Local, directed by Darshan Bhagat
- Narrative Feature: The Debut, directed by Gene Cajayon
- Documentary Feature: When You’re Smiling, directed by Janice Tanaka
- Narrative Short: Mouse, directed by Greg Pak
- Documentary Short: Shit, the Movie, directed by Julie Gaw
- Experimental: By this Parting, directed by Mieko Ouchi
