= AXS Map =

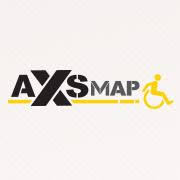
- The AXS Map logo
- Website type: Web mapping
- Owner: AXS Lab
- Creator: Jason DaSilva
- Website: www.axsmap.com
- Commercial: No
- Launched: 2010; 16 years ago
- Current status: Online

AXS Map is a user-generated database of accessible locations in all major cities. Powered by GoogleMaps API, AXS Map functions by providing users with a database of locations that they can edit with ratings and reviews of accessibility metrics for disabled individuals. This in turn allows other users to see these reviews, screening which locations they choose to travel to, and adding their own reviews of the places they enter to expand the database. Rather than leaving accessibility reviews to specialists, AXS Map allows any member of the public to use the tool to report their experience. As well as offering accessibility ratings for the mobility impaired, AXS Map also reviews accessibility for the visually and hearing impaired.

== History ==
AXS Map was founded by Jason DaSilva in 2009. DaSilva had been diagnosed with primary progressive multiple sclerosis several years prior to the creation of AXS Map, and began to recognize that many of places surrounding him in New York City were not accessible. Inspired by his increasing difficulties navigating through his daily life, DaSilva created an AXS Map as an app and web database to help people with disabilities. The creation of the database was shown in Dasilva's film When I Walk.

In 2011, DaSilva received a grant from Google Earth Outreach and a couple other foundations to build the prototype for AXS Map. After receiving this funding, he then partnered with Kevin Bluer, a skilled technologist and entrepreneur, to build the first prototype. DaSilva and Bluer discussed the project at "Maps for Good," part of the prestigious Google I/O conference, in June 2012, the same year it launched. AXS map received major media attention in 2014, including a national profile by Dr. Sanjay Gupta and a feature in Oprah Magazine. DaSilva presented AXS Map at the White House in November 2015. In a profile of AXS Map in his book Mad Genius, Randy Paul Gage wrote that AXS Map "has now morphed into a movement to map out a searchable database of accessible sites". By mid-2019, AXS Map had been used in over 200 cities. AXS Map has been supported by Google, the Government of Ontario, the Canada Media Fund, the Fledgling Fund, New York Community Trust, and the Rubin Foundation, and has had many partners over the years, including Stanford University, Parsons School of Design, New York University, and Kwantlen Polytechnic University. AXS Map is being expanded to map accessibility in all of the world's major cities. It is available to access online, and by iPhone and Android phones.

== AXS Mapathons ==
AXS Mapathons are events in which community members come together using AXS Map to map the accessibility of their neighborhoods, and are held regularly. AXS Mapathons have been held in New York City, San Francisco, Toronto, and over 50 other cities. Outside of North America, AXS Mapathons have been held in the countries of Georgia and Paraguay. As part of Google Serve, AXS Mapathons also take place in many Google offices around the world. Significant Google Serve Mapathons have happened in New York, Toronto, Mountain View, Austin, and Atlanta.

List of AXS Mapathon Events
Date	Place	Hosts	Notes	Ref
June 11, 2013 to June 13, 2013	New York, New York	AXS Map and Acorda Therapeutics		
May 28, 2016	Amsterdam, Netherlands	AXS Map and Diversability		
May 18, 2019	Queens, New York, New York	AXS Map, Woodside Sunnyside Runners, Sunnyside Woodside Action Group, the Girl Scouts of Greater New York Troops 4283 and 4597, and the Love, Hallie Foundation		
June 23, 2021	Honolulu, Hawaii	AXS Map		

== Awards ==
- 2025 Anthem Awards - Silver, Responsible Technology, Short Form Video
- 2025 Gold Telly Award - Promotional Video, General Accessibility
- 2021 Fast Company - World Changing Ideas Awards finalist
- 2021 Shorty Awards - Best Social Good Campaign (Nominated)
