= Karan Soni =

Indian and American actor (born 1989)

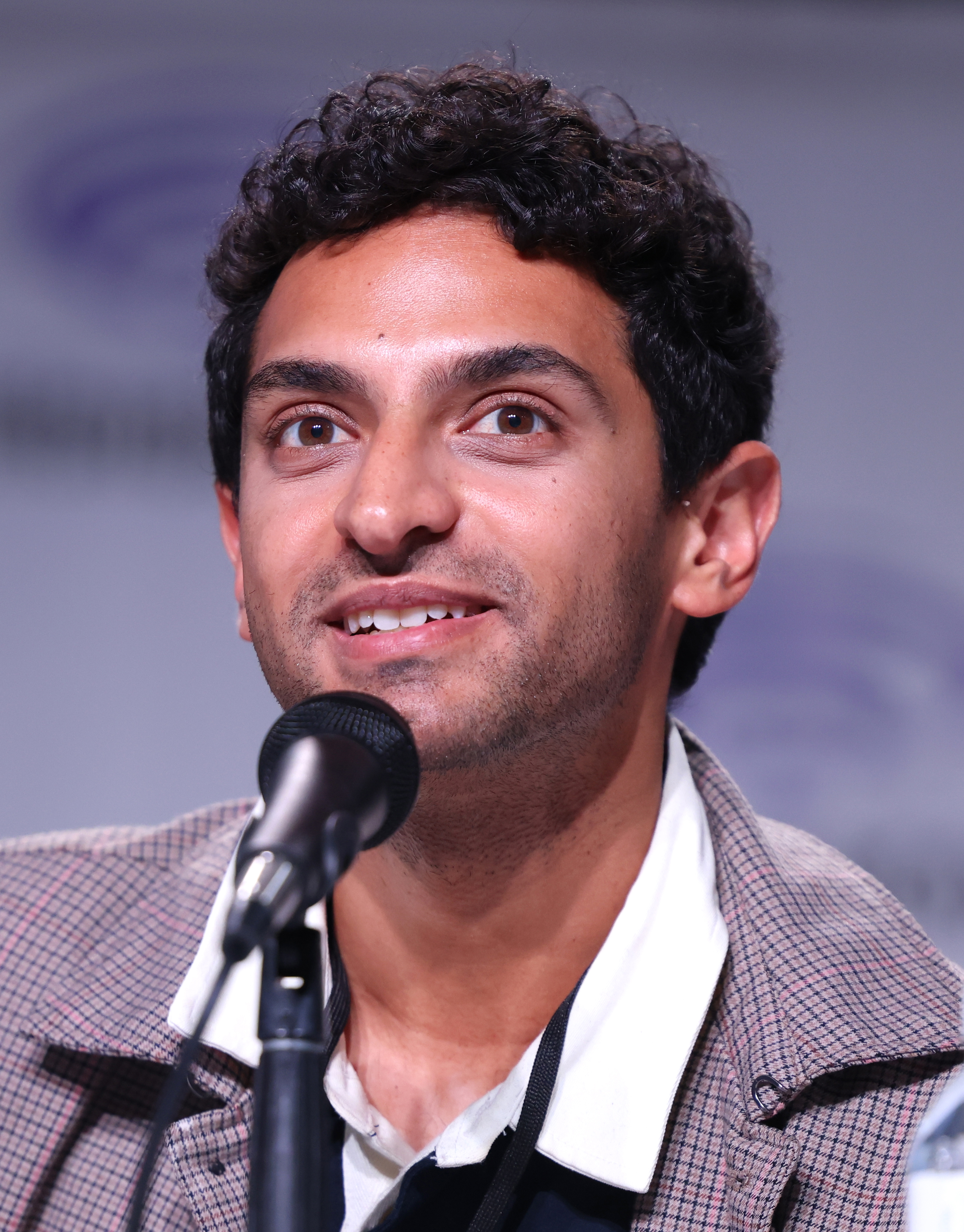
- Soni in 2025
- Born: January 8, 1989 (age 37); New Delhi, India
- Citizenship: United States
- Education: USC School of Dramatic Arts
- Occupation: Actor
- Years active: 2010–present
- Spouse: Roshan Sethi

Karan Soni (born January 8, 1989) is an Indian-American actor. Often appearing in comedic roles, he came to prominence for playing Dopinder in the films Deadpool (2016) and its sequels Deadpool 2 (2018) and Deadpool & Wolverine (2024), and voicing Pavitr Prabhakar / Spider-Man India in Spider-Man: Across the Spider-Verse (2023).

Born in New Delhi, Soni moved to the United States to study business at the University of Southern California before pursuing an acting career. He made his feature film debut in Safety Not Guaranteed (2012), which was followed by lead appearances on the series Betas (2013) and Other Space (2015), and the film A Nice Indian Boy (2024). Soni has also appeared in the films Ghostbusters (2016), Office Christmas Party (2016), and Pokémon Detective Pikachu (2019). On television, he has appeared as a series regular on Blunt Talk (2015–2016) and Miracle Workers (2019–2023).

== Early life ==
Soni was born in New Delhi, India, and he attended an international school there. He came to the United States to study at the University of Southern California.

== Career ==
Soni made his film debut in Yusuf Sumer's 2010 comedy film Kaka Nirvana, alongside Rachel Quinn. In 2013, Soni was cast in the Amazon Studios original series Betas. The series was canceled after one season. In 2014, Soni appeared in commercials for AT&T along with Jim Conroy.

In 2015, Soni appeared in Other Space, a series created by Paul Feig for Yahoo! Screen, as Captain Stewart Lipinski. Yahoo! Screen would be shut down later in the year, preventing the series from being renewed for a second season, while the first season would later be picked up by DUST in 2020. Later in 2015, he appeared in episodes of Melissa & Joey, The Goldbergs and 100 Things to Do Before High School and began starring in Blunt Talk, opposite Patrick Stewart, as Martin. The series was renewed for a second season, which premiered in 2016.

Soni appeared in the 2016 Marvel film Deadpool as a taxi driver named Dopinder and reprised the role in its sequels Deadpool 2 (2018) and Deadpool & Wolverine (2024). In 2016, Soni also appeared in Ghostbusters as the delivery man Benny and in 2019, he appeared in Pokémon Detective Pikachu. From 2019 to 2023, Soni was a main cast member of the anthology comedy television series Miracle Workers.

In February 2023, Soni was announced as the voice of Pavitr Prabhakar / Spider-Man India in Spider-Man: Across the Spider-Verse. In August 2024, Soni confirmed that he would reprise his role as Spider-Man India in Spider-Man: Beyond the Spider-Verse.

Soni played the lead role in the romantic comedy A Nice Indian Boy which premiered at South by Southwest on March 12, 2024. He also starred in Stealing Pulp Fiction. In September 2024, it was announced that Soni had been cast as the lead role in the thriller film Fade to Black. In 2025, he was part of the ensemble cast for the Audible Original audio drama Murder at the Patel Motel. Soni appeared in the opening episode of Pluribus.

== Personal life ==
Soni is gay. He is married to writer and director Roshan Sethi, with whom he developed the film 7 Days.

== Filmography ==
Key
†	Denotes works that have not yet been released

=== Film ===
Year	Title	Role	Notes
2010	Kaka Nirvana	Kemal	Short film
2012	Safety Not Guaranteed	Arnau	
2012	Bit by Bit	Chander	Short film
2014	Supremacy	Store Clerk	
2014	Obedient Artists	Jaxton	
2015	Goosebumps	Mr. Rooney	
2016	Deadpool	Dopinder	
2016	Chee and T	Roger Raval	
2016	The Sweet Life	Convenience Store Clerk	
2016	Mono	Amit Chowdury	
2016	Ghostbusters	Benny	
2016	Office Christmas Party	Nate Winetoss	
2017	Rough Night	Raviv	
2017	And Then There Was Eve	Zain	
2017	Unicorn Store	Kevin	
2017	Creep 2	Dave	
2018	Little Bitches	Hall Monitor Andy	
2018	Deadpool 2	Dopinder	
2018	Better Start Running	Nelson	
2018	Office Uprising	Mourad	
2019	Corporate Animals	Freddie	
2019	Pokémon Detective Pikachu	Jack	
2019	Always Be My Maybe	Tony	
2020	Like a Boss	Josh Tinker	
2020	Trolls World Tour	Riff	Voice
2020	Superintelligence	Ahmed	
2020	Coffee Shop Names	Sathya/Scott	Short film
2021	7 Days	Ravi	Also writer
2021	Coming Out with the Help of a Time Machine	Sid	Short film
2022	Not Okay	Kelvin	
2022	The People We Hate at the Wedding	Dominic	
2022	Four Samosas	Sanjay	
2022	Strange World	Caspian	Voice
2023	Spider-Man: Across the Spider-Verse	Pavitr Prabhakar / Spider-Man India	Voice
2023	World's Best	Calming Voice	Voice
2024	A Nice Indian Boy	Naveen Gavaskar	
2024	Paper Flowers	Milan Mehta	
2024	Deadpool & Wolverine	Dopinder	
2024	Stealing Pulp Fiction	Steve	
2027	Spider-Man: Beyond the Spider-Verse †	Pavitr Prabhakar / Spider-Man India	Voice; In production
TBA	Fade to Black †	Amit	Post-production
TBA	Thud †		Post-production

=== Television ===
Year	Title	Role	Notes
2011	The Protector	Kenny	Episode: "Safe"
2011	Worst. Prom. Ever.	Glenn	Television film
2012	Touch	Ravi	Episode: "1+1=3"
2012	Linked Out	Keith	Episode: "Facebook Intervention"
2012	1600 Penn	Misfit	Episode: "Putting Out Fires"
2012	Bite Me	Teacher's Assistant	Episode: "Continue!"
2012	Are You There, Chelsea?	Stan	Episode: "Sloane's Ex"
2012–2013	The Neighbors	Indian Allen	2 episodes
2012–2013	Geo's Pizza	Asheed	8 episodes
2013	Little Horribles	Unknown	Episode: "Road Rage"
2013	Trophy Wife	Graduate No. 2	Episode: "Pilot"
2013	Aim High	Mingesha Dutta	Episode 2.2
2013	The Middle	Vijal	Episode: "Life Skills"
2013–2014	Mighty Med	Benny	3 episodes
2013–2014	Betas	Avinash "Nash" Dagavi	Main role
2014	Growing Up Fisher	Owen	Episode: "Secret Lives of Fishers"
2015	Melissa & Joey	Flash	Episode: "Failure to Communicate"
2015	Other Space	Stewart Lipinski	Main role
2015	100 Things to Do Before High School	Caltech Dude	Episode: "Be a Mad Scientist Thing!"
2015	Any Tom, Dick, or Harry	Ernie Dassani	Television film
2015–2016	Blunt Talk	Martin Bassi	Recurring (season 1); Main role (season 2)
2015–2017	The Goldbergs	Randy Mescunda, Srinivas Bollimpalli	6 episodes
2016	The Grinder	Cooper	Episode: "From the Ashes"; uncredited
2017	I Live with Models	Marshall	5 episodes
2017	What Would Diplo Do?	Bellboy	1 episode
2017	Silicon Valley	Tenley	Episode: "Hooli-Con"
2017	Room 104	Anish	Episode: "The Internet"; also director
2018	Bobcat Goldthwait's Misfits & Monsters	Ravi	Episode: "Mermaid"
2018	Wrecked	Keith	2 episodes
2019	Brooklyn Nine-Nine	Gordon Lundt	Episode: "The Honeypot"
2019	Miracle Workers	Sanjay Prince	Main role
2019	Will & Grace	Mike	Episode: "With Enemies Like These"
2020	Miracle Workers: Dark Ages	Lord Chris Vexler	Main role
2020	Cake	Himself	Episode: "Auditions: No Reader"
2020	Dream Corp LLC	Patient 27	Episode: "Fear of Heights"
2020	Aunty Donna's Big Ol' House of Fun	Jerry Seinfeld	Episode: "Housemates"
2020	Big Mouth		Voice, episode: "Four Stories About Hand Stuff"
2020–2021	Mira, Royal Detective	Manjeet	Voice, 10 episodes
2021	Special	Dev Laghari	2 episodes
2021	Miracle Workers: Oregon Trail	The Gunslinger	Main role
2021	Trolls: Holiday in Harmony	Riff	Voice, television film
2021–2022	Karma's World	Mr. Rishi Singal	Voice, 11 episodes
2022	The Great North	Gavin	Voice, episode: "Woodfellas Adventure"
2022	Home Economics	Tod	Episode: "Novel Signed by Author, $22.19"
2022–2023	The Boss Baby: Back in the Crib	Pip	Voice, 25 episodes
2023	Miracle Workers: End Times	TI-90, Tai	Main role, 10 episodes
2023	Strange Planet	Being No. 1 / Bestie	Voice, episode: "Adolescent Limbshake"
2024	Abbott Elementary	Avi	3 episodes; also directed episode: "Librarian"
2024	Nobody Wants This	Vali	Episode: "Obliterated"
2025	American Dad!	Indian Anchor	Voice, episode: "Guardian"
2025	Mickey Mouse Funhouse	Naatu Bandar	Voice, episode: "The Golden Mango"
2025	Pluribus	Deshpande	Episode: "We Is Us"
2026	The Boroughs †	Toby	

== Podcasts ==
Year	Title	Role	Notes	Ref.
2021	The Coldest Case	Edgar	3 episodes	
2021	Bridgewater		4 episodes	
2021	Dark Air with Terry Carnation	Jeet Batra	18 episodes	
2025	Murder at the Patel Motel			
