= Abraham Lim =

Abraham Lim may refer to:

- Abraham Lincoln Lim, American film director
- Abraham Lim (actor), American actor and singer
