= Punam Patel =

American actress

- Occupation: Actress
- Years active: 2015–present

Punam Patel is an American actress. She is best known for her roles in the sitcom Kevin from Work (2015) and the television series Special (2019), the latter of which earned her a Primetime Emmy Award nomination.

== Early life ==
Patel grew up in Vero Beach, Florida and graduated from Saint Edward's School.

== Career ==
Patel was nominated for a 2019 Primetime Emmy Award for Outstanding Actress in a Short Form Comedy or Drama Series for her role as Kim Laghari on Special.

In 2021, Patel joined the Showtime comedy pilot I Love That for You.

== Filmography ==
=== Film ===
Year	Title	Role	Notes
2019	Rim of the World	Angeline	
2023	World's Best	Priya Patel	
2025	Diary of a Wimpy Kid: The Last Straw	Mrs. Winsky (voice)	

=== Television ===
Year	Title	Role	Notes
2015	East Los High	Guest Star	2 episodes
2015	Kevin from Work	Patti	Regular
2016	Life in Pieces	Kara	Episode: "Bite Flight Wing-Man Bonnie"
2016	Lonely and Horny	Pua	Episode: "Threesome"
2016	The Gay and Wondrous Life of Caleb Gallo	Panana (advisor)	2 episodes
2017	Return of the Mac	Soozie	Regular
2017	Adam Ruins Everything	Melinda	4 episodes
2018	Alone Together	Tara	Recurring
2018	I Feel Bad	Leena	Episodes: "I'm a Massive Hypocrite" and "There's Never Enough Time"
2018–19	The Cool Kids	Punam	Recurring
2019–21	Special	Kim Laghari	Regular
2020	Carol's Second Act	Dr. Mehta	Episode: "Blocking"
2020	Space Force	Ranatunga	Recurring
2021	American Dad!	Radika (voice)	Episode: "Stan & Francine & Stan & Francine & Radika"
2021	Curb Your Enthusiasm	Hulu Executive #3	Episode: "The Mini Bar"
2021	Hot Mess Holiday	Sheila	TV movie
2022-present	Ghosts	Bela	14 episodes
2022	I Love That for You	Beena Patel	
2022	Mira, Royal Detective	Janki	
2025	Running Point	Gloria	
