= Zarna Garg =

Indian-American comedian

- Born: February 15, 1975 (age 51); India
- Education: University of Akron (BA); Case Western Reserve University (JD)
- Spouse: Shalabh Garg
- Children: 3

Zarna Garg (born February 15, 1975) is an Indian American stand-up comedian and screenwriter. CNBC said she is "the zany, outspoken voice of the Indian American woman." She is also a New York Times bestselling author.

== Early life and education ==
Born in India, Zarna lived in Mumbai as a teenager. Her mother died of hepatitis when Zarna was 14. Her father demanded that she get married the day after her mother died. Rather than have an arranged marriage, she moved out of the house and stayed with friends and family. Eventually, she emigrated to the United States to live with her sister in Akron, Ohio.

Garg earned a bachelor's degree in finance from the University of Akron, and a Juris Doctor degree from the Case Western Reserve University School of Law in Cleveland, Ohio. After being a stay-at-home mother for 16 years, she was encouraged by her children to try stand-up comedy.

== Career ==
Garg first performed at an open mic in a basement under a Mexican restaurant in New York City in 2018, and her first official stand-up show was in February 2019 at Carolines on Broadway in Midtown Manhattan, New York. Her debut romantic comedy screenplay Rearranged won the Best Comedy Screenplay Award at the 2019 Austin Film Festival in Austin, Texas, and was also a 2019 Academy Nicholl Fellowships Semi-Finalist.

In 2021, Garg won Kevin Hart's comedy competition on Peacock, Lyft Comics. In the same year, she won the Ladies of Laughter Award in the Newcomer Winner category. In 2022 she was highlighted as "one of the gutsiest women comedians in America" in Gutsy on Apple TV, hosted by Hillary Clinton and Chelsea Clinton. She appeared on Tamron Hall, Today, and This American Life to discuss how her daughter Zoya inspired her to start her stand up comedy career. Zarna Garg made a second appearance on This American Life with her husband, Shalabh. She was named one of "Variety's 10 Comics to Watch for 2023."

Her first comedy special, Zarna Garg: One in a Billion, was released on Prime Video on May 16, 2023. It was filmed in September 2022 at the Gramercy Theatre in Manhattan. "Quick set-ups, rapid-fire punchlines... Zarna has the kind of presence that powers network sitcoms," said Jason Zinoman of The New York Times. In June 2023, Garg joined Kamala Harris and others to welcome Indian Prime Minister Narendra Modi during his visit to Washington. In August 2023, Garg launched The Zarna Garg Family Podcast, exploring a variety of both everyday and traditionally "off limits" topics with her husband and kids. The podcast currently receives around 40,000 YouTube views per episode.

From 2023 to 2025 Garg opened for Tina Fey and Amy Poehler's Restless Leg Tour. In January 2024, Garg made her Tonight Show debut, followed by her Late Night debut in May. In October 2024, the Garg family celebrated Diwali with President Biden in the White House, which Zarna Garg described as "such an honor."

Garg's follow up special, Practical People Win, debuted at #2 on Hulu on July 18, 2025. Garg's memoir This American Woman was released on April 29, 2025 and is a New York Times bestseller. Garg starred in A Nice Indian Boy as the mother of the Gavaskar family. The film premiered at the SXSW film festival to positive reviews and is a New York Times Critic's Pick. In August 2025 Garg was awarded one of the inaugural Instagram Ring Awards for Creativity. Her upcoming sitcom Zarna is in development at CBS with Kevin Hart and Mindy Kaling. Garg participated in the 2025 Saudi Arabia's Riyadh Comedy Festival, an event which Human Rights Watch characterized as an attempt by the Saudi government to whitewash its human rights abuses. She is one of three women to agree to participate in the festival. Garg has stated that her comedy specials are most watched in the Middle East out of all regions, and that she feels an obligation to represent and perform for "brown women" there.

Garg is currently performing her next stand-up hour, Million Dollar Excuses, on tour in the U.S. and internationally.

== Political views ==
Garg has praised Usha Vance, the wife of U.S. vice president JD Vance, describing her speech at the Republican National Convention in July 2024 as "brilliant" and calling her "Vance's Michelle Obama". She has also spoken out against the immigration policies of the Biden administration.

Garg cheered on Kamala Harris's candidacy after President Biden endorsed her in July 2024, saying, "Go, Indian ladies!" referring to Usha Vance and Kamala Harris. Garg described Harris as "absolutely ready," "extremely eloquent," "extremely elegant," and a "brilliant woman", and that Kamala's presence in the White House has "forever changed" American life and stretched the imagination of millions of Indian American women. When asked whom she likes better (Usha Vance or Kamala Harris), Zarna said she would be "very happy and very comfortable" if Kamala ends up running America, but that she was bursting with pride to see Usha Vance in the public eye as well.

== Personal life ==
In 1998, Zarna and Shalabh Garg were married in the U.S. They met on an online platform. They have three children and live in New York City.

== Filmography ==
Year	Title	Role	Notes
2021	To the Letter	Asha	Voice, short film
2023	Zarna Garg: One in a Billion Amazon	Self	Also writer
2023	The Zarna Garg Show: Family Podcast	Self	Producer
2024	The Tonight Show Starring Jimmy Fallon	Self	Guest
2024	A Nice Indian Boy	Megha Gavaskar	Actress
2025	Zarna Garg: Practical People Win	Self	Also writer
2026	Hell's Kitchen	Self	Chef's table guest diner for the red team; Episode: "Revolutionary Revenge"
