= 7 Days (2021 film) =

- Film poster
- Directed by: Roshan Sethi
- Written by: Karan Soni; Roshan Sethi
- Produced by: Liz Cardenas; Mel Eslyn
- Starring: Karan Soni; Geraldine Viswanathan
- Cinematography: Jeremy Mackie
- Edited by: Stephanie Kaznocha
- Music by: Amanda Jones
- Production company: Duplass Brothers Productions
- Distributed by: Cinedigm
- Release dates: June 10, 2021 (Tribeca); March 25, 2022
- Running time: 86 minutes
- Country: United States
- Language: English

7 Days is a 2021 American romantic comedy film directed by Roshan Sethi, in his directorial debut, from a screenplay by Sethi and Karan Soni. It stars Soni, Geraldine Viswanathan, Mark Duplass, Zenobia Shroff, Aparna Nancherla, Gita Reddy and Jeffery Self.

It had its world premiere at the Tribeca Film Festival on June 10, 2021.

== Plot ==
The film opens with several Indian couples discussing their traditional arranged marriages. An Indian website is a modern method for unmarried singles to seek a spouse. Both Ravi's and Rita's mothers have created profiles for them on Arranged, a website for America-based Indians.

Ravi and Rita have an awkward pre-arranged date at a dry reservoir. As her mother had posted she was a vegetarian, he had brought a special meat-free meal. When she points out that the lemonade he brought was hard and the site stated he is a teetotaler, embarrassed, he pours it on the ground.

Suddenly they both get alerts to their phones about the COVID-19 pandemic, going back to her place they simultaneously call their moms. It is a mess, trash everywhere, dirty dishes and evidence that she drinks. Ravi waits for the car rental agency to call him back, as his train has been cancelled. As there won't be a car until morning, Rita offers him the couch. After he updates his mom, he overhears her talking dirty to someone on the phone. In a panic, he goes to her bathroom and finds her vibrator.

First thing in the morning Ravi leaves as soon as he can on foot to the agency. Rita gives him a friendly goodbye, but he leaves coldly. Relieved he's gone, she grabs a beer and a cold chicken drumstick from the fridge. Ravi suddenly pops back in, as he is told it will be three more days. He is forced to shelter in place due to the pandemic.

When Ravi asks about the alcohol and meat Rita begs him to not tell her mother. He concedes then blurts out that they aren't a good match, pointing out her dishonesty as a reason. She explains that her mother pays for her rent in exchange for her participation in the website.

Ravi tries to make small talk, and then asks Rita if he can clean, saying it relaxes him. Finished cleaning, he gets a teasing call from his brothers about being holed in with her. He is antsy whereas she is totally relaxed, used to inactivity as she's unemployed.

Chatting again, Rita admits she's not remotely interested in marriage, whereas Ravi insists he needs to get married before he can have any intimacy. He insists he's not boring, describing odd idiosyncrasies of his lab mates.

Rita gets a call from her lover, who turns out to be married. Unable to go for a walk, Ravi shows he's emotional as he describes to her a Bollywood movie. Bored, she spikes his Coke with whiskey and, as he's never touched alcohol, it quickly affects him. He both tries to do standup comedy and then dance for the first time, but gets sick.

Sore at Rita the next morning, Ravi blames her for his hangover. A short while later, she joins him for an online workout. Her mother calls, asking about the date, hoping she didn't divulge her true self, as he couldn't love 'that you'.

Ravi offers to teach Rita to cook. In the process, he is appalled at her process and the result, but she is pleased. His mother sets him up on a virtual blind date, which Rita coaches him through. Ravi finishes the date really happy, but dreams of Rita.

The next morning, after Rita hears Ravi's conversation via speakerphone with his mother she goes stir crazy and insists on going out, and doesn't take a mask. She arrives back late. In the morning, upon saying goodbye she coughs, so he cancels his departure to help Rita quarantine.

During the day or so of quarantining, they get to know one another. She talks about her affair, he tells her very infantile knock knock jokes and during the night her bad coughing concerns him, so he spoons her. By morning, he calls an ambulance.

Once Rita is hospitalized, Ravi goes through her things, with notable and increasing affection. He has a lot of difficulty contacting her via phone. Ravi discovers her paintings are all sweet and about love, not raunchy as she implied.

Her mom calls, and he tells her about Rita's COVID hospitalization. She asks to Zoom with him. Finally able to talk with Rita, she informs him that the woman she'd been sharing her hospital room with has died. Rita then gets progressively sicker and cannot respond but a doctor at the hospital keeps Ravi informed, and Rita recovers. When she's released, they meet in a park and their mutual affection is visible.

== Cast ==
- Karan Soni as Ravi
- Geraldine Viswanathan as Rita
- Mark Duplass as Daddy (voice)
- Zenobia Shroff as Rita's mom
- Aparna Nancherla as Swathi
- Gita Reddy as Ravi's mom
- Jeffery Self as Dr. Henry
- Asif Ali as Asif
- Vinny Chhibber as Vinny
- Deborah Baker Jr. as work out instructor (voice)

== Production ==
Principal photography on the film began in summer 2020, over the course of 8 days.

== Release ==
7 Days had its world premiere at the Tribeca Film Festival on June 10, 2021.

The film won Best Narrative Feature awards at the San Diego Asian Film Festival and the Coronado Island Film Festival. The film also won Best First Feature at the 37th Independent Spirit Awards.

In November 2021, Cinedigm bought US distribution rights to the film, planning to release it on March 25, 2022.

== Reception ==
7 Days received positive reviews from film critics. It holds an 86% approval rating on review aggregator website Rotten Tomatoes, based on 51 reviews, with a weighted average of 6.6/10. The website's critics consensus reads, "If it isn't the most convincing love story, 7 Days remains a well-acted rom-com with a fresh perspective and some strong ideas."
