= I Love That for You =

American television comedy series

- Genre: Comedy
- Created by: Vanessa Bayer; Jeremy Beiler
- Starring: Vanessa Bayer; Molly Shannon; Paul James; Ayden Mayeri; Matt Rogers; Punam Patel; Jenifer Lewis
- Country of origin: United States
- Original language: English
- No. of seasons: 1
- No. of episodes: 8

Production
- Executive producers: Jeremy Beiler; Vanessa Bayer; Jessi Klein; Michael Showalter; Megan Ellison; Sue Naegle; Jordana Mollick; Allyce Ozarski
- Camera setup: Single-camera
- Production companies: The First Todd; Say Mama; Go Balloons; Semi-Formal Productions; Annapurna Television; Showtime Networks

Original release
- Network: Showtime
- Release: May 1 – June 19, 2022

I Love That for You is an American comedy television show created and executive produced by Vanessa Bayer and Jeremy Beiler for Showtime. The show stars Bayer as Joanna Gold, an aspiring host for shopping channel SVN, who lies that her childhood cancer has returned in order to keep her job. The story is inspired by Bayer's personal experience with childhood leukemia. I Love That for You premiered on May 1, 2022. In June 2023, the series was canceled after one season.

== Cast ==
=== Main ===
- Vanessa Bayer as Joanna Gold
- Molly Shannon as Jackie Stilton
- Paul James as Jordan Wahl
- Ayden Mayeri as Beth Ann McGann
- Matt Rogers as Darcy Leeds
- Punam Patel as Beena Patel
- Jenifer Lewis as Patricia Cochran, CEO of SVN

=== Recurring ===
- Matt Malloy as Chip Gold
- Michelle Noh as Suzanne Dunaysh
- Bess Armstrong as Marcy Gold
- Jason Schwartzman as Ethan
- Johnno Wilson as Perry

== Episodes ==
No.	Title	Directed by	Written by	Original release date	U.S. viewers (millions)
1	"GOTTAHAVEIT"	Michael Showalter	Vanessa Bayer & Jeremy Beiler	May 1, 2022 (Note: The episode was first released on the Showtime app on April 29, 2022, ahead of its Showtime on-air premiere.)	0.071
2	"FAUX FLORALS"	Michael Showalter	Jeremy Beiler	May 8, 2022	0.061
3	"#JOANNASTRONG"	Andrew DeYoung	Zora Bikangaga	May 15, 2022	0.080
4	"IMPECCABLE SHE CASUALS"	Andrew DeYoung	Sudi Green	May 22, 2022	0.049
5	"DADDY'S LIL' COOKIES"	Desiree Akhavan	Crystal Jenkins	May 29, 2022	0.053
6	"CRYSTAL BUDDIEZ"	Desiree Akhavan	Ali Liebegott	June 5, 2022	0.054
7	"POINT OF NO RETURNS"	Heather Jack	Albertina Rizzo	June 12, 2022	0.039
8	"SHOP CANCER'S ASS"	Heather Jack	Vanessa Bayer & Jeremy Beiler and Jessi Klein	June 19, 2022	0.059

== Production ==
I Love That for You was filmed in Los Angeles. The series consists of eight episodes. The show was originally titled I Love This for You. On June 7, 2023, Showtime canceled the series after one season.

== Reception ==
=== Critical response ===
On the review aggregator website Rotten Tomatoes, 75% of 12 critics' reviews are positive, with an average rating of 6.8/10. The website's consensus reads: "Tonal inconsistency and an ill-defined ensemble can make this comedy hard to love, but it wholly delivers as an overdue showcase for Vanessa Bayer." Metacritic, which uses a weighted average, assigned a score of 62 out of 100 based on 12 critics, indicating "generally favorable reviews".

=== Ratings ===
Viewership and ratings per episode of I Love That for You
No.	Title	Air date	Rating (18–49)	Viewers (millions)	DVR (18–49)	DVR viewers (millions)	Total (18–49)	Total viewers (millions)
1	"GOTTAHAVEIT"	May 1, 2022	0.01	0.071	TBD	TBD	TBD	TBD
2	"FAUX FLORALS"	May 8, 2022	0.00	0.061	TBD	TBD	TBD	TBD
3	"#JOANNASTRONG"	May 15, 2022	0.01	0.080	TBD	TBD	TBD	TBD
4	"IMPECCABLE SHE CASUALS"	May 22, 2022	0.00	0.049	TBD	TBD	TBD	TBD
5	"DADDY'S LIL' COOKIES"	May 29, 2022	0.01	0.053	TBD	TBD	TBD	TBD
6	"CRYSTAL BUDDIEZ"	June 5, 2022	0.01	0.054	TBD	TBD	TBD	TBD
7	"POINT OF NO RETURNS"	June 12, 2022	0.00	0.039	TBD	TBD	TBD	TBD
8	"SHOP CANCER'S ASS"	June 19, 2022	0.00	0.059	TBD	TBD	TBD	TBD
