= Mogul Mowgli =

2020 film by Bassam Tariq

- Official promotional poster
- Directed by: Bassam Tariq
- Written by: Bassam Tariq; Riz Ahmed
- Produced by: Riz Ahmed; Thomas Benski; Bennett McGhee; Michael Peay
- Starring: Riz Ahmed; Aiysha Hart; Alyy Khan; Sudha Bhuchar; Nabhaan Rizwan; Anjana Vasan
- Cinematography: Anika Summerson
- Edited by: Adam Biskupski; Hazel Baillie
- Music by: Paul Corley
- Production companies: Pulse Films; Left Handed Films; BBC Films; Cinereach; VICE Studios; RYOT Films; Silvertown Films
- Distributed by: BFI Distribution (United Kingdom); Strand Releasing (United States)
- Release dates: February 21, 2020 (Berlin); October 30, 2020 (United Kingdom); September 3, 2021 (United States)
- Running time: 90 minutes
- Countries: United States; United Kingdom
- Language: English
- Box office: $127,015

Mogul Mowgli is a 2020 drama film directed by Bassam Tariq, and written by Tariq and Riz Ahmed. It stars Ahmed and features Aiysha Hart, Alyy Khan, Sudha Bhuchar, Nabhaan Rizwan, and Anjana Vasan. It tells the story of a British-Pakistani rapper who is struck down by a disease.

Produced by Pulse Films, the film had its world premiere in the Panorama section at the 70th Berlin International Film Festival on February 21, 2020. It was released in the United Kingdom on October 30, 2020, by BFI Distribution, and in the United States on September 3, 2021, by Strand Releasing.

== Plot ==
Zed is a British-Pakistani rapper who is based in New York. He is offered a big break supporting a more famous rapper on a European tour, but before it begins, he returns home to England for a somewhat tense reunion with his rather traditional family, leaving behind Bina, his American girlfriend. After collapsing he is taken to hospital and told his leg muscles have weakened. He also starts experiencing bizarre visual and auditory hallucinations. He is diagnosed with a degenerative autoimmune disease and experimental stem-cell infusions are recommended, but they come with the risk of infertility. His manager Vaseem proposes substituting RPG, a rival rapper whom Zed doesn't respect, as a replacement for the tour, but Zed resists the idea and refuses to accept that his illness will put an end to his dream. As Zed grows weaker, his father helps him at hospital, but they argue and Zed tells him to leave. Zed is offered the chance to freeze his sperm, but when he finally calls Bina to tell her he's sick and offer her his sperm, she rejects him, so he does not make a sperm donation. Although he misses the tour when his therapy begins, he does achieve something of a rapprochement with his father.

== Cast ==
- Riz Ahmed as Zed
- Aiysha Hart as Bina
- Alyy Khan as Bashir
- Sudha Bhuchar as Nasra
- Nabhaan Rizwan as RPG
- Anjana Vasan as Vaseem
- Hussain Manawer as Bilal
- Kiran Sonia Sawar as Asma
- Jeff Mirza as Toba Tek Singh

== Production ==
The idea for the film first began in 2017 when Riz Ahmed met Bassam Tariq. The film was tentatively titled Mughal Mowgli. In March 2019, it was announced Ahmed would star in the film, with Tariq directing from a screenplay by himself and Ahmed. Thomas Benski, Bennett McGhee, Michael Peay and Ahmed would produce the film, under their Pulse Films and Left Handed Films banners, while BBC Films, Cinereach, Vice Media, and RYOT Films would also produce. That same month, Aiysha Hart, Anjana Vasan, Sudha Bhuchar, Alyy Khan, and Nabhaan Rizwan joined the cast of the film. Production began that same month.

== Release ==
The film had its world premiere in the Panorama section at the 70th Berlin International Film Festival on February 21, 2020. In August 2020, BFI Distribution acquired U.K. distribution rights to the film. It was released in the United Kingdom on October 30, 2020. In November 2020, it was shown at the Hawai'i International Film Festival as part of the Vilcek Foundation's New American Perspectives program. In December 2020, Strand Releasing acquired U.S. distribution rights to the film. It was released in the United States on September 3, 2021.

=== Critical reception ===
On review aggregator website Rotten Tomatoes, the film holds an approval rating of 93% based on 104 reviews, with an average rating of 7.4/10. The site's critics consensus reads: "An ambitious portrait of the complicated nature of identity, the challenging and emotionally raw Mogul Mowgli showcases a heartbreaking performance from Riz Ahmed." On Metacritic, the film has a weighted average score of 71 out of 100, based on 27 critics, indicating "generally favorable reviews".

Stephen Dalton of The Hollywood Reporter commented that "Although Mogul Mowgli is an admirably ambitious effort overall, a more complex, colorful, daring film seems to be trapped just below the surface." Guy Lodge of Variety wrote, "This is gutsy, spiky, imperfect independent filmmaking that finds the formal gusto to complement and buoy its star's aggressive dynamism: Ahmed affirms his standing as one of Britain's most vital, risky actors, even in a role we thought we'd already seen him play."

Roxana Hadadi of RogerEbert.com gave the film 3/4 stars and highlights its "aesthetic power and cultural curiosity." She notes that the film tackles big questions about "individual ambition, inherited trauma, artistic integrity, and cultural assimilation", resulting in a "deeply personal and sometimes-opaque cinematic experience." Hadadi points out that Tariq prioritizes depicting Muslim lives in ways beyond accusations of terrorism and that the film reflects this ideology.

Peter Bradshaw's gave Mogul Mowgli 3/5 stars. In his review for The Guardian, he describes the film as a "deeply personal drama" that can sometimes be "self-indulgent" but also tackles "the complexities of 21st-century British selfhood head on". He considers the film a "black-comic fable" about the dangers of returning home after achieving success. In another review for The Guardian, Wendy Ide praises Tariq for his inventive exploration of cultural identity, family, and the long shadow of Partition through Zed's illness. She describes the filmmaking as abrasive and confrontational, blending spoken-word poetry, Partition history, and painful family memories in a powerful and impactful way. Ide gave Mogul Mowgli 4/5 stars.

== Accolades ==
Mogul Mowgli won Best Narrative Feature at the 2020 San Diego Asian Film Festival.
