= A Nice Indian Boy =

2024 American romantic comedy film

- Theatrical release poster
- Directed by: Roshan Sethi
- Screenplay by: Eric Randall
- Based on: A Nice Indian Boy by Madhuri Shekar
- Produced by: Renee Witt; Charlie McSpadden; Andrew Calof; Justin Baldoni
- Starring: Karan Soni; Jonathan Groff; Sunita Mani; Zarna Garg; Harish Patel
- Cinematography: Amy Vincent
- Edited by: Stephanie Kaznocha
- Music by: Raashi Kulkarni
- Production companies: Levantine Films; Wayfarer Studios; Kaling International; Scythia Films
- Distributed by: Blue Harbor Entertainment
- Release dates: March 12, 2024 (South by Southwest); April 4, 2025 (United States)
- Running time: 96 minutes
- Country: United States
- Languages: English; Hindi
- Box office: $902,453

A Nice Indian Boy is a 2024 American romantic comedy film directed by Roshan Sethi. Based on Madhuri Shekar's play of the same name, the film follows Naveen, an Indian-American doctor, who brings his fiancé, Jay, a white man adopted by Indian parents, to meet his traditional family. It stars Karan Soni, Jonathan Groff, Sunita Mani, Zarna Garg, and Harish Patel. The film premiered at South by Southwest on March 12, 2024, and was released in the US on April 4, 2025, by Blue Harbor Entertainment. The film received positive reviews.

== Plot ==
When Naveen attends his sister Arundhathi's wedding, family and friends in attendance insist that he is the next in line to get married. Six years later, Naveen is still single, working as a doctor with his much more outgoing coworker Paul. Naveen struggles to make romantic connections due to his shyness and perception that his parents are uncomfortable with his sexual orientation.

While praying at a temple to Lord Ganesha, Naveen encounters a white man, much to his surprise. He meets the man again at work, discovering that he is a professional photographer named Jay, and is instantly attracted to him. Jay asks Naveen out to see a movie with him, which Naveen discovers is the famous Bollywood film Dilwale Dulhania Le Jayenge, also known as DDLJ. Jay explains that he was a foster child adopted by Indian immigrant parents, who have since died.

Jay and Naveen become closer and eventually move in together, despite tension over Jay's more free-spirited and bohemian lifestyle, and Naveen's reluctance to introduce Jay to his family. During an argument, in which Jay says that Naveen does not ever express what he wants, Naveen emotionally reveals that he shares Jay's romantic dream of a big family wedding, somewhat inadvertently proposing to Jay. He also agrees to bring Jay home to meet Arundhathi and his parents, Megha and Archit.

Although their meeting starts well, Jay becomes stressed by the growing tension between Naveen and Arundhathi, as well as Naveen's white lies about Jay to make him more acceptable to Megha and Archit. In an attempt to calm down, Jay uses a marijuana pen in Megha and Archit's bathroom, which Arundhathi reveals to the disapproval of their parents. Jay excuses himself and leaves the house, after which Arundhathi discloses that she is leaving her husband, to the shock of her family.

Jay, believing that Naveen does not accept him for who he is, packs up and moves out of Naveen's apartment. Arundhathi stays with Naveen and apologizes for causing the fight between him and Jay. Naveen decides to reconcile with Jay and goes out of his comfort zone, copying a romantic scene from DDLJ to properly propose to Jay, who happily accepts.

Megha enthusiastically begins preparations for Jay and Naveen's wedding, though Archit is initially reluctant. Naveen becomes angry with Archit, believing that Archit has still not accepted Naveen's sexuality. Archit invites Jay over to cook with him, learning more about Jay and realizing that he is a suitable match for Naveen. Megha tells Naveen that she and Archit are accepting of his sexuality, but they feel like he has distanced himself from them and that they are afraid that he will push them out of his life.

At the wedding, Naveen and his family perform a choreographed dance routine for Jay. Megha comforts Arundhathi about her divorce and delivers an emotional wedding speech, moving the usually stoic Archit to tears. The film ends with Naveen and Jay dancing together, surrounded by friends and family.

== Cast ==
- Karan Soni as Naveen Gavaskar
- Jonathan Groff as Jay Kurundkar
- Sunita Mani as Arundhathi Gavaskar
- Zarna Garg as Megha Gavaskar
- Harish Patel as Archit Gavaskar
- Peter S. Kim as Paul
- Sas Goldberg as Billie
- Sean Amsing as Neel
- Sachin Sahel as Manish
- Jason Bradstock as Polly Parton
- James Cousineau as Wedding guest
- Keith Dallas as Head nurse
- Dhirendra as Wedding planner
- Devinder Dillon as Pandit
- Pete Graham as Cranky doctor
- Balinder Johal as Ancient grandmother
- Seth Ranaweera as Manish's Dad
- Tyler Roberge as Bro
- Ryan Roopnarine as Groomsman

== Production ==
The film is directed by Roshan Sethi, with the screenplay written by Eric Randall, who adapted it from a play of the same name by Madhuri Shekar. Shekar was also a co-executive producer. Cinematography was by Amy Vincent. Stephanie Kaznocha edited the film, and Raashi Kulkarni composed the score.

The film was produced by Renee Witt, Charlie McSpadden, Andrew Calof, and Justin Baldoni, and executive produced by Mindy Kaling and Daniel Bekerman. Production companies involved with the film are Levantine Films, Baldoni's Wayfarer Studios, Kaling's Kaling International, and Bekerman's Scythia Films.

== Release ==
A Nice Indian Boy premiered at South by Southwest on March 12, 2024. It was selected as the opening night film for NewFest on 10 October 2024, and then had its international premiere at BFI London Film Festival on 15 October 2024.

In December 2024, it was announced that Blue Harbor Entertainment would handle distribution in the United States. The film's first trailer was released on March 4, 2025, and the film was released in cinemas in the US on April 4, 2025. The film was also released in India on October 17, 2025, with the altered title A Nice Boy.

== Reception ==
On review aggregator Rotten Tomatoes, the film holds an approval rating of 97% based on 58 reviews. The website's critics consensus reads, "Buoyed by Karan Soni and Jonathan Groff's appealingly sweet performances, A Nice Indian Boy navigates cultural mores and romance with an infectiously kind heart." Metacritic, which uses a weighted average, assigned the film a score of 85 out of 100, based on 7 critics, indicating "universal acclaim". The film received the audience award at the 2024 Tasveer Film Festival and won the Sherzum Award at the 2024 Hamptons Film Festival.

=== Accolades ===
Award	Date of ceremony	Category	Recipient	Result	Ref.
Astra Midseason Movie Awards	July 3, 2025	Best Indie	A Nice Indian Boy	Nominated	
GLAAD Media Award	March 5, 2026	Outstanding Film – Limited Release	A Nice Indian Boy	Won	
Golden Trailer Awards	May 29, 2025	Best Romance	"Trailer"	Won	
Society of Composers & Lyricists Awards	February 6, 2026	David Raksin Award for Emerging Talent	Raashi Kulkarni	Nominated	
