= Mary Katherine Gallagher =

Fictional character

- First appearance: Saturday Night Live
- Created by: Molly Shannon
- Portrayed by: Molly Shannon

In-universe information
- Gender: Female
- Occupation: Catholic schoolgirl
- Nationality: American

Mary Katherine Gallagher is a fictional character invented and portrayed by Saturday Night Live cast member Molly Shannon from 1995 to 2001. She was considered the first breakout character from the new 1995 cast and a significant marker of the increased influence of women writers on the show in the 1990s. Shannon portrayed the character in a 1999 film, Superstar, and she also reprised the role when she hosted Saturday Night Live in 2007. Shannon first created an early version of the character when she was in school at NYU, during a comedy show directed by Madeleine Olnek. In 2024, she portrayed the character in a pre-taped video with Vice President Kamala Harris that was shown at the Al Smith Dinner, which Harris declined to attend.

A prototype version of her appears in the Where In The World Is San Diego California? sketch from the Bob Saget-hosted episode of SNL aired May 6, 1995.

== Character ==
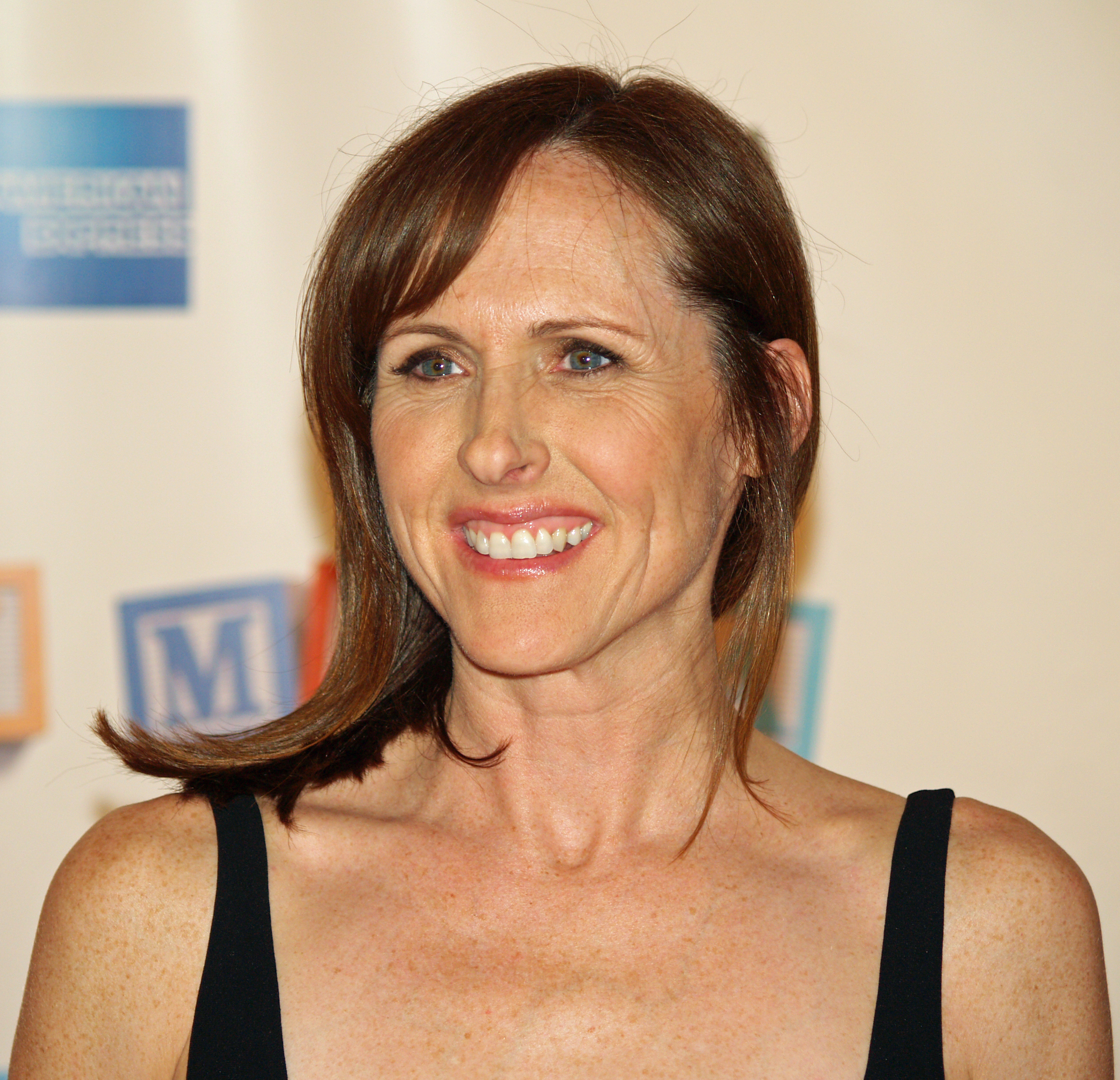
Mary Katherine Gallagher is portrayed by Molly Shannon (pictured in 2008).

Mary Katherine is a sardonic caricature of an unpopular, teenage Catholic school girl. She is prone to comically severe mood swings, alternately hyperactive and ponderous. She suffers from stage fright, but is also hyper-competitive (on one occasion, she engages in a sing-off with Whitney Houston) and egomaniacal, believing she is a "superstar".

Lacking in proper social skills, her signature move is that, when nervous, she squeezes her hands under her armpits and then sniffs them. She demonstrates this habit to most new people she meets. She also has a habit of flashing her underwear either accidentally or on purpose.

The sketches usually begin with a school-related dramatic arts function, such as choir practice or school play rehearsals. Mary Katherine runs on stage and introduces herself, and then attempts to participate, monopolizing the spotlight until she loses her cool and does something socially inappropriate.

At some point, she typically announces that her feelings would be best expressed by reciting a monologue, sometimes from a film such as West Side Story, or from an obscure TV movie such as The Betty Broderick Story starring Meredith Baxter-Birney. While reciting the monologue, she becomes overly dramatic and intensely emotional, to the extent to where others intervene to stop her monologue.

The sketch usually ends with her making a pratfall, such as falling over, crashing into a wall or destroying something. She then jumps up, regains her composure, and extends her hands in the air, proclaiming "Superstar!"

== Superstar ==
In 1999, a feature-length film, entitled Superstar, was released, starring Shannon as Gallagher. Several of her SNL cast mates, including Will Ferrell and Mark McKinney, also appear in the film.

In the film, Mary Katherine lives with her disabled grandmother (an unseen character in the SNL skits), who believes Mary Katherine bears a striking resemblance to a young Elizabeth Taylor. Wanting to attract the attentions of Sky, the most attractive boy in school (played by Will Ferrell), Mary Katherine decides to enter the school talent competition. Her grandmother, however, prevents her from pursuing her dreams and forbids her to compete. It is later revealed that she intervened because Mary Katherine's parents were stomped to death while participating in a dance competition.

== Episodes featuring Mary Katherine Gallagher ==
- May 6, 1995 host: Bob Saget (a proto version of her)
- October 28, 1995 host: Gabriel Byrne
- December 2, 1995 host: Anthony Edwards
- January 13, 1996 host: Christopher Walken
- February 24, 1996 host: Elle MacPherson
- April 20, 1996 host: Teri Hatcher
- October 5, 1996 host: Lisa Kudrow
- November 16, 1996 host: Robert Downey, Jr.
- December 14, 1996 host: Rosie O'Donnell
- February 22, 1997 host: Alec Baldwin
- March 22, 1997 host: Mike Myers
- May 17, 1997 host: Jeff Goldblum
- October 25, 1997 host: Chris Farley
- November 22, 1997 host: Rudy Giuliani
- March 7, 1998 host: Scott Wolf
- November 21, 1998 host: Jennifer Love Hewitt
- February 6, 1999 host: Gwyneth Paltrow
- October 2, 1999 host: Jerry Seinfeld
- February 17, 2001 host: Sean Hayes
- January 20, 2001 host: Mena Suvari (during the American Beauty dream sequences in Suvari's monologue)
- May 12, 2007 host: Molly Shannon
- February 15, 2015, in a cameo appearance during Saturday Night Live 40th Anniversary Special

== See also ==
- List of recurring Saturday Night Live characters and sketches
