= Superstar (1999 film) =

- Theatrical release poster
- Directed by: Bruce McCulloch
- Written by: Steve Koren
- Based on: Mary Katherine Gallagher by Molly Shannon
- Produced by: Lorne Michaels
- Starring: Molly Shannon; Will Ferrell; Elaine Hendrix; Harland Williams; Mark McKinney; Glynis Johns
- Cinematography: Walt Lloyd
- Edited by: Malcolm Campbell
- Music by: Michael Gore
- Production companies: SNL Studios; Broadway Video
- Distributed by: Paramount Pictures
- Release date: October 8, 1999
- Running time: 81 minutes
- Country: United States
- Language: English
- Budget: $14 million
- Box office: $30.6 million

Superstar is a 1999 American romantic comedy film and a Saturday Night Live spin-off about a quirky, socially inept girl named Mary Katherine Gallagher. The character was created by SNL star Molly Shannon and appeared as a recurring character on SNL in numerous sketches.

The story follows Mary Katherine trying to find her place in her Roman Catholic private school. The movie is directed by Kids in the Hall member Bruce McCulloch. It stars Molly Shannon, Will Ferrell, Elaine Hendrix, Harland Williams, Mark McKinney, who appeared in many of the Mary Katherine Gallagher SNL skits on TV, and Glynis Johns in her final film.

Superstar was released by Paramount Pictures on October 8, 1999. The film received mixed reviews from critics and grossed $30.6 million against a $14 million budget. Molly Shannon received a nomination for Blockbuster Entertainment Award "Favorite Actress - Comedy" but lost out to Heather Graham in Austin Powers: The Spy Who Shagged Me.

== Plot ==
As a child, Mary Katherine Gallagher rescues a boy with a distinctive birthmark at the public pool. An orphan, she lives with her grandmother, and becomes obsessed with achieving "superstardom" and having her first kiss.

At St. Monica's Catholic high school, Mary dreams of kissing Sky Corrigan, the most popular boy in school, but her awkwardness brands her a social outcast. Caught kissing a tree, she is placed in special education, where she befriends Helen Lewengrub, and new "bad boy" student Eric Slater takes an interest in her.

A school talent show is announced with the chance to win a trip to Hollywood and be a movie extra. Mary's grandmother forbids her from participating, but Helen urges her to audition anyway, as does a vision of Jesus.

When she tries to sign up, Mary finds herself in an altercation with head cheerleader Evian Graham, Sky's girlfriend. Mary's grandmother reveals the true reason she will not let Mary perform – Mary's parents were stomped to death during an Irish dance competition.

Having witnessed the fight with Mary, Sky breaks up with Evian, who swears revenge on Mary. Auditioning for the talent show, Mary performs an impassioned rendition of "Sometimes When We Touch". Evian dumps a bucket of paint on her, inspired by Carrie; humiliated, Mary flees the school with Slater.

Slater brings Mary to the pool, revealing that he was the boy she saved years ago, and they bond during an impromptu swim. Returning home, she finds her grandmother has been informed that Mary earned a place in the talent show. Finally allowing her to perform, Mary's grandmother coaches her and a chorus line of her special education classmates.

As the talent show begins, Evian apologizes to Mary, revealing she and Sky will be dancing together. Mary resolves to perform not to impress Sky, but for herself. In a last-minute confession, Mary relinquishes her dream of becoming a star, instead asking to survive the performance for her grandmother's sake.

Mary and her friends perform to "Out Here on My Own" as Slater, summoned by another vision of Jesus, arrives just in time to watch. The record player inadvertently speeds up, and Mary falls – echoing her parents' fatal performance – but, encouraged by Jesus, she successfully leads her friends through their performance. Met with a standing ovation, Mary wins the talent show. Sky kisses her, but she rejects him, and kisses Slater.

The film ends as Mary, now dating Slater, kisses the tree goodbye.

== Cast ==
- Molly Shannon as Mary Katherine Gallagher
- Will Ferrell as Sky Corrigan/Jesus
- Harland Williams as Eric Slater
- Elaine Hendrix as Evian Graham
- Mark McKinney as Father Tylenol Ritley
- Glynis Johns as Grandma Gallagher (in her last film role)
- Jason Blicker as Howard
- Gerry Bamman as Father John Insomnic
- Emmy Laybourne as Helen Lewengrub
- Jennifer Irwin as Maria
- Rob Stefaniuk as Thomas Smith
- Natalie Radford as Autumn Winters
- Karyn Dwyer as Summer Falls
- Tom Green as Dylan
- Chuck Campbell as Owen
- Robert Clark as young Eric Slater

== Reception ==
The film received mixed reviews from critics. On the review aggregator website Rotten Tomatoes, 32% of 74 critics' reviews are positive, with an average rating of 4.4/10. The website's consensus reads: "Dumb script and flat jokes made this another SNL misfire." Metacritic, which uses a weighted average, assigned the film a score of 42 out of 100, based on 22 critics, indicating "mixed or average" reviews. Audiences surveyed by CinemaScore gave the film a grade "C+" on scale of A to F.

Roger Ebert of the Chicago Sun-Times rated the film one star out of four, writing: "Here is a portrait of a character so sad and hapless, so hard to like, so impossible to empathize with, that watching it feels like an act of unkindness." He furthermore described Shannon's character as "hostile" and "not very nice", stating that "She's one of those people who inspires in you the inexplicable desire to be hurtful and cruel". James Berardinelli of ReelViews, who gave the film two out of four stars, said that "Molly Shannon is a likable, energetic performer" and some of the jokes were "actually funny", but there would still not be "enough here to justify a feature-length movie". He also felt the film's attempts "at developing Mary into something more than a two-dimensional caricature" were pointless since "the script doesn't show any respect for her". Dennis Harvey of Variety magazine gave a positive review, calling the film a "pleasant surprise" as he expected only mediocrity from another Saturday Night Live adaptation. He said it is "amusing" but "uneven", suggesting it might build good word of mouth and do well but would be unlikely to reach the commercial success of Wayne's World.
