= Molly Shannon =

American actress and comedian (born 1964)

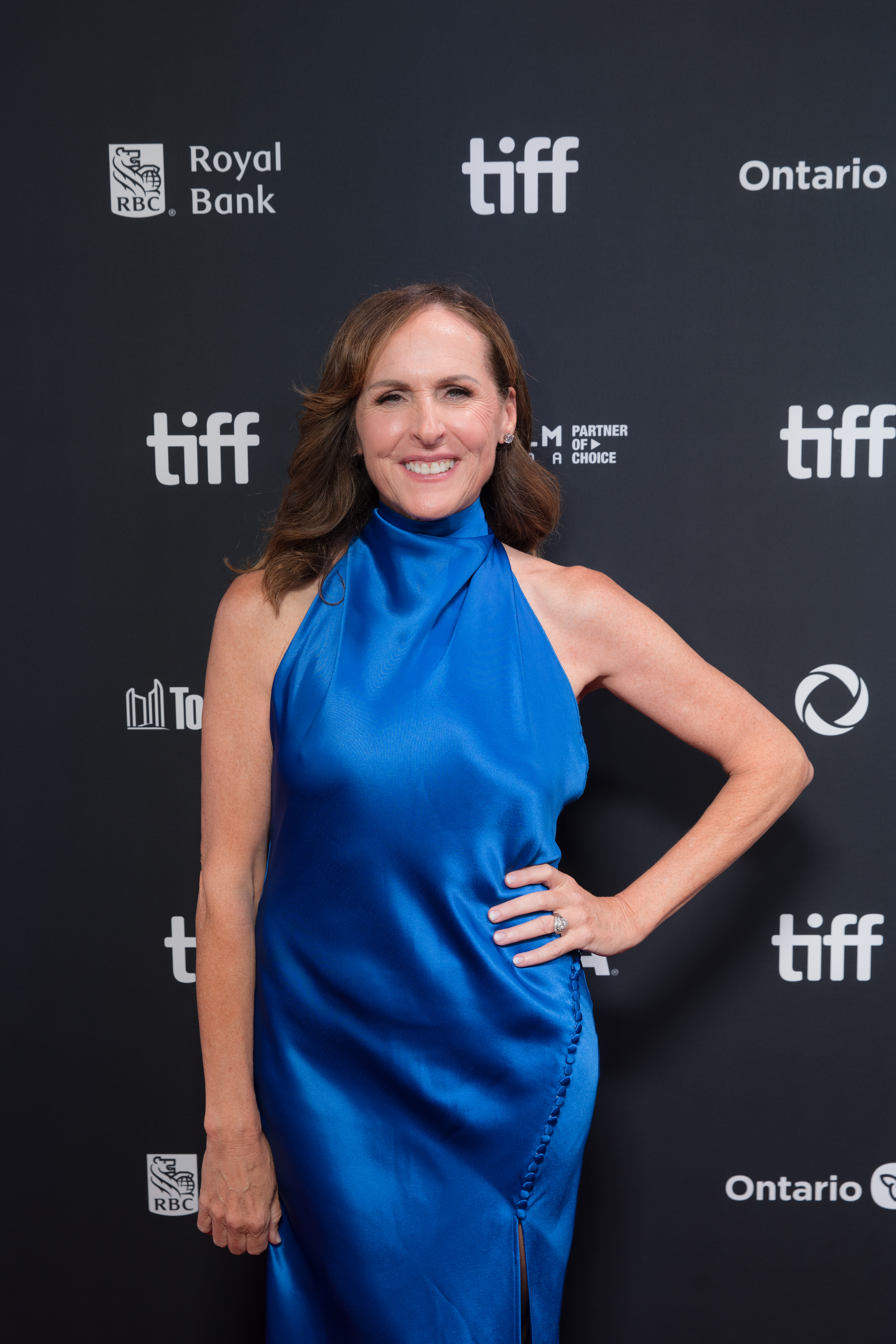
- Shannon in 2025
- Born: September 16, 1964 (age 62); Shaker Heights, Ohio, U.S.
- Education: New York University (BFA)
- Occupations: Actress; comedian
- Years active: 1983–present
- Spouse: Fritz Chesnut (m. 2004)
- Children: 2

Molly Shannon (born September 16, 1964) is an American actress and comedian. She was a cast member on the NBC sketch comedy series Saturday Night Live from 1995 to 2001. In 2017, she won the Film Independent Spirit Award for playing Joanne Mulcahey in the Chris Kelly autobiographical film Other People.

Shannon appeared in supporting roles in several films, including Happiness (1998), A Night at the Roxbury (1998), Never Been Kissed (1999), How the Grinch Stole Christmas (2000), Wet Hot American Summer (2001), Serendipity (2001), Osmosis Jones (2001), My Boss's Daughter (2003), Talladega Nights: The Ballad of Ricky Bobby (2006), More of Me (2007), Evan Almighty (2007), and Me and Earl and the Dying Girl (2015). She appeared in the animated films Igor (2008) and Hotel Transylvania (2012). On television, Shannon had roles in Enlightened (2013), Divorce (2016–2019), The Other Two (2019–2022), The White Lotus (2021), I Love That for You (2022), and Only Murders in the Building (2024), winning her first Screen Actors Guild Award for Outstanding Performance by an Ensemble in a Comedy Series for the lattermost.

== Early life ==
Shannon was born in Shaker Heights, Ohio, to an Irish-American Catholic family. Her maternal grandparents were born in Ireland, with her grandfather being from Cloghmore, Achill, Mayo.

On June 1, 1969, when Shannon was four years old, she and her older sister survived a car crash that killed her younger sister, her cousin, and her mother. Her father, Jim, was driving the family home from an all-day party during which he drank alcohol and subsequently took a nap. The crash occurred 90 minutes into the drive later that evening when the car struck a solid steel light pole (since that time, most light poles have been converted to breakaway poles to reduce injuries). Contrary to published articles that Jim had been driving drunk, there was no BAC report taken. In her memoir, Hello, Molly!, Shannon writes: "There is no way to know exactly what happened that night, though my gut tells me he fell asleep at the wheel."

Shannon attended high school in Ohio, and she attended New York University, where she studied drama and graduated from NYU's Tisch School of the Arts in 1987.

== Career ==
Before Saturday Night Live, Shannon worked as a hostess at Cravings restaurant on Sunset Boulevard, and as a food demo girl at Gelson's supermarket in Marina Del Rey. She auditioned for her first big film role and was cast, playing the supporting part of Meg in the 1989 horror film remake of The Phantom of the Opera, with Robert Englund. In 1991, she had a brief appearance in the second season of Twin Peaks as "the happy helping hand lady", and in 1993, she appeared with minor roles in three episodes of In Living Color, the first in a fake TV commercial with Shawn Wayans playing Chris Rock, the second in a sketch with Jim Carrey, playing LAPD Sergeant Stacey Koon, and third being a parody of Star Trek.

Shannon's major break came in February 1995, when she was hired as a featured player on Saturday Night Live to replace Janeane Garofalo, who had left mid-season. Shannon was one of the few cast members to be kept (along with David Spade, Norm Macdonald, Mark McKinney and Tim Meadows) when Lorne Michaels overhauled his cast and writers for season 21 (1995–96).

She appeared in a 1997 episode of Seinfeld titled "The Summer of George", where she played Sam, the co-worker who drove Elaine Benes crazy because she did not swing her arms while walking. She appeared in Sheryl Crow's video for the song "A Change (Will Do You Good)" and played the recurring role of loony neighbor Val Bassett, Grace Adler's nemesis, on Will & Grace, appearing in five episodes over the sitcom's eight-season run. In 1998, she played the role of Emily Sanderson in the film A Night at the Roxbury, featuring Will Ferrell and Chris Kattan who were also cast members of SNL at the time. She appeared in Sex and the City in a number of episodes.

In 1999, Shannon starred in Superstar, a feature film based on her character Mary Katherine Gallagher, an awkward Catholic school student who aspires to be a musical superstar. Shannon had created the character while a student at NYU, and had expanded on her in a series of SNL sketches prior to the film.

During her run on SNL, Shannon starred in the films Never Been Kissed (1999), How the Grinch Stole Christmas (2000), Osmosis Jones (2001) and Serendipity (2001). Shannon left SNL in 2001. In 2003, she appeared in the romantic comedy My Boss's Daughter and the television remake of The Music Man.

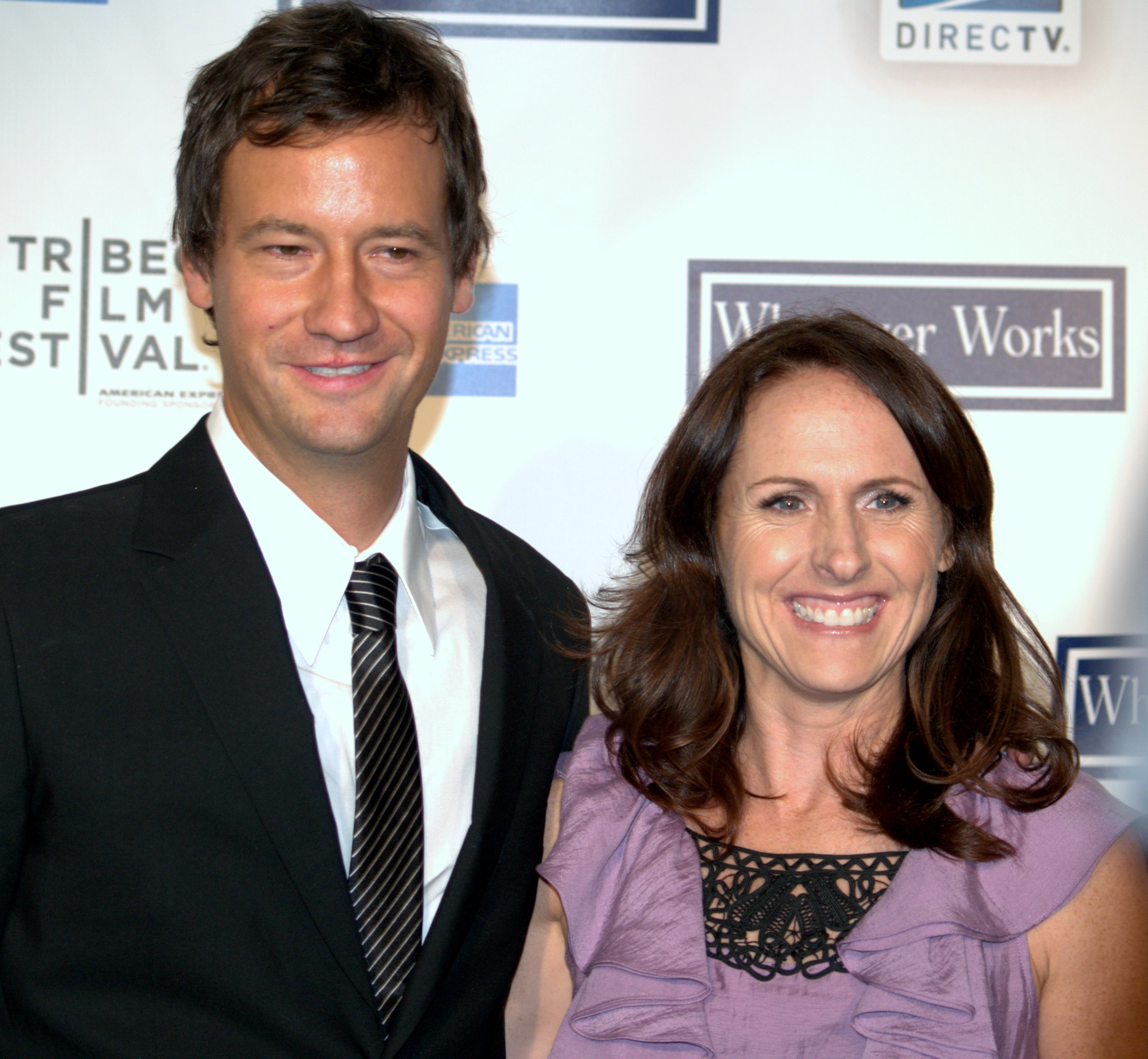
Fritz Chesnut and Shannon in 2009.

In 2004, she starred in a short-lived Fox network television series Cracking Up. That same year, she guest starred in an episode of Scrubs and starred as Mrs. Baker in the film Good Boy! In 2006, Shannon was featured in the Sofia Coppola-directed movie Marie Antoinette as Aunt Victoire. The next year, Shannon guest-starred on ABC's Pushing Daisies, and appeared in the film Evan Almighty. At that time, Shannon also made a move to drama, appearing in Mike White's film Year of the Dog in 2007. In 2013, Shannon joined White again, playing his love interest Eileen in the HBO show Enlightened, for which she was nominated for an Emmy for outstanding guest actress.

Shannon hosted Saturday Night Live on May 12, 2007, making her the second former female cast member to host (after Julia Louis-Dreyfus) and the first one to have been a cast member for Lorne Michaels (Louis-Dreyfus was a cast member under Dick Ebersol).

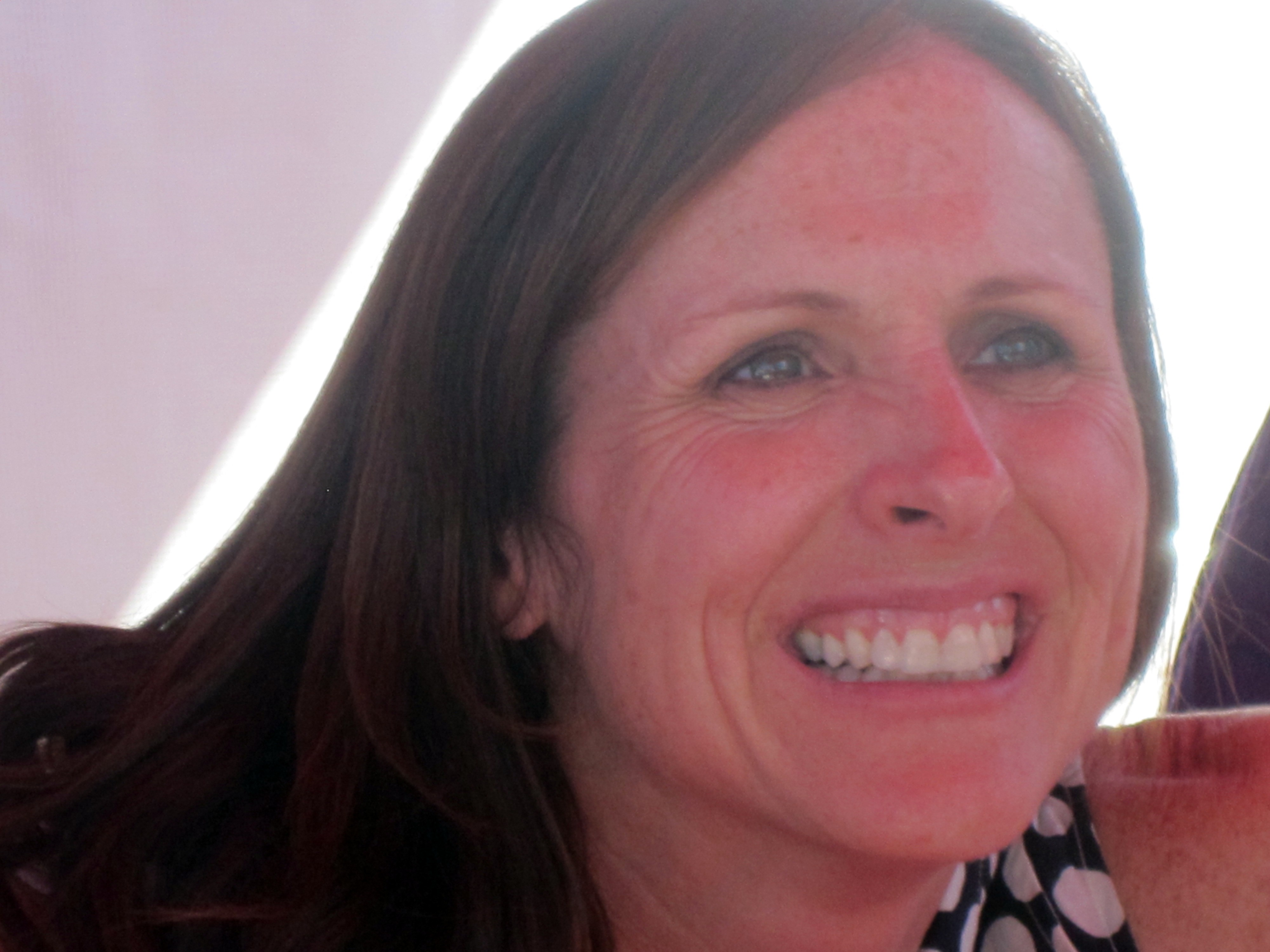
Shannon at the Orange County, California, Children's Book Festival on October 2, 2011, promoting her first children's book, Tilly the Trickster.

In 2008, Shannon starred as Kath in the American version of the Australian sitcom Kath & Kim.

In early 2010, Shannon was cast in a recurring role on the Fox television series Glee as Brenda Castle, an astronomy and badminton teacher who has a rivalry with main character Sue Sylvester.

She returned to Saturday Night Live for a special Mother's Day episode on May 8, 2010, and the October 2010 reunion special "Women of SNL".

Shannon replaced Katie Finneran in the role of Marge McDougall in the Broadway revival of Promises, Promises on October 12, 2010, and remained through its closure on January 2, 2011, along with co-stars Sean Hayes and Kristin Chenoweth.

Shannon's first children's book, Tilly the Trickster, was released September 1, 2011.

In spring 2012, she has replaced Pauley Perrette as the spokesperson for Expedia.

In 2015, Shannon starred in the Sundance premiere of Me and Earl and the Dying Girl directed by Alfonso Gomez-Rejon. The following year, in 2016, Shannon co-starred in the HBO comedy Divorce opposite Sarah Jessica Parker and Thomas Haden Church.

Shannon won the 2017 Film Independent Spirit Award for Best Supporting Actress for her performance in the highly acclaimed drama, Other People. She had two films premiere at the 2017 Sundance Film Festival: The Little Hours and Fun Mom Dinner.

In 2018, Shannon co-hosted the Rose Parade with Will Ferrell on Amazon Prime Video in character as fictional local television personalities, Tish and Cord. In 2018, Shannon and Ferrell co-hosted HBO's broadcast of the wedding of Prince Harry and Meghan Markle as their characters Tish and Cord. Also in 2018, Shannon co-starred in the critically acclaimed Netflix film Private Life, playing prickly Cynthia.

Shannon released Hello, Molly!: A Memoir (ISBN 9780063056251) in 2022. In that same year she Shannon co-starred in the Showtime comedy television series I Love That for You alongside fellow former SNL alum Vanessa Bayer. Shannon joined the cast of the Hulu comedy series Only Murders in the Building for its fourth season in 2024.

=== Saturday Night Live characters ===
- Mary Katherine Gallagher: Shannon's best known character. An odd, outcast student at a Catholic school who enjoyed performing in the choir and school plays. Shannon starred in the 1999 feature film Superstar based on the character.
- Sally O'Malley: a proud 50-year-old dancer ("I'm FIFTY!") with a bouffant hairdo, who wore tight red pants and proclaimed how much she loved to "kick, stretch and kick!"
- Circe Nightshade: co-host of "Goth Talk" (with Chris Kattan).
- Miss Colleen: co-host of "Dog Show" (with Will Ferrell).
- Elizabeth: one of the "Southern Gals."
- Helen Madden: an overly exuberant self-proclaimed "Joyologist", who appeared on talk shows with the trademark catchphrase "I love it, I love it, I love it!"
- Veronica Kilvere: an airhead fashion model who hosts the "Veronica & Co." talk show.
- Janette Blow: wife of Joe Blow (played by Colin Quinn) on "The Local News" public-access television cable TV talk show.
- Terri Rialto: co-host of the NPR radio show "Delicious Dish" (with Ana Gasteyer).
- Margaret Healy: a woman who enjoys doing many voices and accents.
- Jeannie Darcy: an unfunny mullet-haired stand-up comedian, who ended almost every joke with the phrase "Don't get me started, don't even get me started!"

==== Celebrity impressions ====
- Shania Twain
- Ann Miller
- Marie Osmond
- Michelle Kwan
- Keri Russell
- Janis Joplin
- Minnie Driver
- Elizabeth Taylor
- Gisele Bündchen
- Emma Bunton
- Courtney Love
- Gillian Anderson
- Madonna
- Paula Zahn
- Kim Cattrall
- Donatella Versace
- Meredith Vieira
- Monica Lewinsky
- Soon-Yi Previn
- Anna Nicole Smith
- Maggie Haberman
- Gwen Stefani
- Lisa Marie Presley
- Liza Minnelli
- Debbie Rowe
- Melania Trump
- Cate Blanchett
- Téa Leoni
- Tori Amos
- Betty Boothroyd
- Angelina Jolie
- Lucy Lawless
- Neve Campbell
- Courteney Cox (as Monica Geller on Friends)
- Suzy Amis Cameron
- Brooke Shields

== Personal life ==
Shannon married artist Fritz Chesnut on May 29, 2004. They have two children.

== Filmography ==
Key
†	Denotes films that have not yet been released

=== Film ===
Year	Title	Role	Notes
1989	The Phantom of the Opera	Meg (New York)	
1994	Return to Two Moon Junction	Traci	
1996	Lawnmower Man 2: Beyond Cyberspace	Homeless Lady	
1997	Dinner and Driving	Arguing Woman in Cafe	
1998	Happiness	Nancy	
1998	A Night at the Roxbury	Emily Sanderson	
1998	The Thin Pink Line	Aanl	
1998	Daydream Believer	Susan Bradley	Short film
1999	Analyze This	Caroline	
1999	Never Been Kissed	Anita	
1999	My Neighbors the Yamadas	Matsuko Yamada	Japanese animated film; English version, Voiceover, 2005
1999	Superstar	Mary Katherine Gallagher	
2000	My 5 Wives	Dr. Van Dyke	
2000	How the Grinch Stole Christmas	Betty Lou Who	
2001	Wet Hot American Summer	Gail von Kleinenstein	
2001	Osmosis Jones	Mrs. Boyd	
2001	Serendipity	Eve	
2001	Shallow Hal	Mrs. Mary Larson	
2002	The Santa Clause 2	Tracy	Cameo
2003	Seeing Double	Jo	
2003	American Splendor	Stage Actor Joyce	
2003	My Boss's Daughter	Audrey Bennett	
2003	Good Boy!	Mrs. Baker	
2005	Here Comes Peter Cottontail: The Movie	Jackie Frost	Voice role
2006	Shut Up and Sing (aka The Wedding Weekend)	Trish	
2006	Scary Movie 4	Marilyn	
2006	Marie Antoinette	Aunt Victoire	
2006	Little Man	Soccer Mom	
2006	Talladega Nights: The Ballad of Ricky Bobby	Mrs. Dennit	
2006	Gray Matters	Carrie	
2006	Air Buddies	Molly	Voice role; Direct-to-video
2007	Year of the Dog	Peggy Spade	
2007	Evan Almighty	Eve Adams	
2008	Snow Buddies	Molly	Voice role; Direct-to-video
2008	Igor	Eva	Voice role
2009	What Goes Up	Penelope Little	
2011	Bad Teacher	Melody Tiara	
2012	Casa de Mi Padre	Sheila	
2012	The Five-Year Engagement	Onion Chef	
2012	Hotel Transylvania	Wanda	Voice role
2013	Scary Movie 5	Heather Darcy	
2013	Trust Me	Janice	
2014	Life After Beth	Geenie Slocum	
2015	Me and Earl and the Dying Girl	Denise Kushner	
2015	Addicted to Fresno	Margaret	
2015	Larry Gaye: Renegade Male Flight Attendant	Emily McCoy	
2015	Hotel Transylvania 2	Wanda	Voice role; Cameo appearance
2016	Other People	Joanne Mulcahey	
2016	Miles	Pam Walton	
2017	The Little Hours	Sister Marea	
2017	Fun Mom Dinner	Jamie	
2017	We Don't Belong Here	Deborah	
2017	The Layover	Nancy	
2018	Private Life	Cynthia	
2018	Half Magic	Mistress Valesca	
2018	Wild Nights with Emily	Emily Dickinson	
2018	Hotel Transylvania 3: Summer Vacation	Wanda	Voice role
2019	Sextuplets	Linda	
2019	Jay and Silent Bob Reboot	Joline	
2020	Promising Young Woman	Mrs. Fisher	
2020	Horse Girl	Joan	
2022	Hotel Transylvania: Transformania	Wanda	Voice role
2022	Spin Me Round	Deb	
2022	Norm Macdonald: Nothing Special	Herself	Stand-up special
2023	A Good Person	Diane	
2025	Driver's Ed	Principal Fisher	
2026	People We Meet on Vacation	Wanda	
2026	Balls Up	Burgess	

=== Television ===
Year	Title	Role	Notes
1991	Twin Peaks	Judy Swain	1 episode
1992–1993	In Living Color	Officer Trainee	5 episodes
1993	General Hospital	Surrogate Mother #2	1 episode
1994	The John Larroquette Show	Vivian	1 episode
1994	Sister, Sister	Cashier	1 episode
1994	Ellen	Woman	1 episode
1995–2001	Saturday Night Live	Various	117 episodes
1997	The Single Guy	Melody Pugh	1 episode
1997	Seinfeld	Sam	1 episode
1999–2004; 2018–2020	Will & Grace	Val Bassett	8 episodes
2000	That '70s Show	Tiffany	1 episode
2000	SNL Fanatic	Anna Nicole Smith	TV short
2001	Spin City	Deborah	1 episode
2001	Saturday Night Live Primetime Extra 1	Elizabeth Taylor	TV short
2002	Sex and the City	Lily Martin	3 episodes
2002	It's a Very Merry Muppet Christmas Movie	Herself (cameo)	TV movie
2003	Johnny Bravo	Multiple voices	1 episode
2003	Ed	Linda Berringer	1 episode
2003	The Music Man	Mrs. Eulalie Mackechnie Shinn	TV movie
2004	12 Days of Christmas Eve	Angie	TV movie
2004	Scrubs	Denise Lemmon	1 episode
2004	Cracking Up	Lesley Shackleton	7 episodes
2005–2007	American Dad!	Christie White	3 episodes
2006	My Gym Partner's a Monkey	Pretties	1 episode
2006	The Amazing Screw-On Head	Patience the Vampire	Voice role; unsold pilot
2007	30 Rock	Katherine Catherine	1 episode
2007	Pushing Daisies	Dilly Balsam	1 episode
2007	The Mastersons of Manhattan	Amanda Masterson	TV movie
2007	More of Me	Alice McGowan	TV movie
2007, 2023	Saturday Night Live	Herself	Host; 2 episodes
2008–2009	Kath & Kim	Kath	18 episodes
2009	The New Adventures of Old Christine	Jeannie	1 episode
2010	Glee	Brenda Castle	2 episodes
2010	Neighbors from Hell	Tina Hellman	Voice role; 10 episodes
2011, 2013	The Middle	Janet	2 episodes
2011–2012	Up All Night	Nancy	2 episodes
2012	Web Therapy	Kirsten Noble	2 episodes
2012	Partners	Cassandra	1 episode
2013	Doc McStuffins	Rita	Voice role; 1 episode
2013	Happily Divorced	Peggy	1 episode
2013	Enlightened	Eileen Foliente	4 episodes
2013	Hannibal	Kidnapper	1 episode
2013	Jessie	Col. Beverly Shannon	1 episode
2013	Super Fun Night	Jane Spencer	1 episode
2013	Getting On	Phyllis Marmatan	3 episodes
2013–2022	Bob's Burgers	Millie	Voice role; 8 episodes
2013–2014	Raising Hope	Maxine	2 episodes
2014	Bambi Cottages	Cathleen Burke	TV movie
2014	The Spoils of Babylon	Meredith Sennheiser	2 episodes, TV miniseries
2014	Benched	Judge Conner	1 episode
2014–2015	The Millers	Miss Pam	2 episodes
2015	Mulaney	Markie	1 episode
2015	The Spoils Before Dying	Tricksy	2 episodes, TV miniseries
2015	Wet Hot American Summer: First Day of Camp	Gail Dana Starfield	7 episodes
2016	Animals.	Olivia	Voice role; 1 episode
2016	Childrens Hospital	Paula Reilly	1 episode
2016–2019	Divorce	Diane	Main role
2017	Life in Pieces	Allie	1 episode
2017	Wet Hot American Summer: Ten Years Later	Gail Dana Starfield	3 episodes
2018	The 2018 Rose Parade Hosted by Cord & Tish	Tish Cattigan	Amazon Video coverage
2018	The Royal Wedding Live with Cord & Tish!	Tish Cattigan	HBO coverage
2018	Spy Kids: Mission Critical	Murna	Voice role; 12 episodes
2019–2023	The Other Two	Pat Dubek	Main role
2020	Better Things	Herself	1 episode
2021	The White Lotus	Kitty Patton	2 episodes
2022	I Love That for You	Jackie Stilton	Main role
2024	Only Murders in the Building	Bev Melon	Recurring role
2024	The Simpsons	Katya	Voice role; 1 episode
2026	The Hawk	Stacy	Main Role

=== Web series ===
Year	Title	Role	Notes
2010	Web Therapy	Kirsten Noble	3 episodes
2013	Ghost Ghirls	Joy Button	3 episodes, streaming on Yahoo! Screen
2016	Rhett & Link's Buddy System	Rhonda	1 episode, streaming on YouTube Premium

=== Music videos ===
Year	Title	Artist	Role
2017	"Swish Swish"	Katy Perry feat. Nicki Minaj	Coach Molly

== Awards and nominations ==
Year	Award	Category	Nominated work	Result	Ref.
2016	AARP Movies for Grownups Awards	Best Supporting Actress	Other People	Nominated	
2016	Awards Circuit Community Awards	Best Actress in a Supporting Role	Other People	Nominated	
2012	Behind the Voice Actors Awards	Best Vocal Ensemble in a Feature Film	Hotel Transylvania	Nominated	
2000	Blockbuster Entertainment Awards	Favorite Actress – Comedy	Superstar	Nominated	
2001	Blockbuster Entertainment Awards	Favorite Supporting Actress – Comedy	How the Grinch Stole Christmas	Nominated	
2013	Critics' Choice Television Awards	Best Guest Performer in a Comedy Series	Enlightened	Nominated	
2019	Critics' Choice Television Awards	Best Supporting Actress in a Comedy Series	The Other Two	Nominated	
2021	Critics' Choice Television Awards	Best Supporting Actress in a Comedy Series	The Other Two	Nominated	
2018	FilmOut San Diego	Best Actress	Wild Nights with Emily	Won	
2016	Independent Spirit Awards	Best Supporting Female	Other People	Won	
2022	Independent Spirit Awards	Best Supporting Performance in a New Scripted Series	I Love That for You	Nominated	
2016	Indiana Film Journalists Association Awards	Best Supporting Actress	Other People	Nominated	
2019	International Online Cinema Awards	Best Supporting Actress in a Comedy Series	The Other Two	Nominated	
2022	International Online Cinema Awards	Best Supporting Actress in a Comedy Series	The Other Two	Nominated	
1998	National Board of Review Awards	Best Acting by an Ensemble	Happiness	Won	
1997	Online Film & Television Association Awards	Best Host or Performer in a Variety, Musical or Comedy Series	Saturday Night Live	Nominated	
2000	Online Film & Television Association Awards	Best Host or Performer in a Variety, Musical or Comedy Series	Saturday Night Live	Nominated	
2018	Online Film & Television Association Awards	Best Guest Actress in a Comedy Series	Will & Grace	Nominated	
2020	Online Film & Television Association Awards	Best Guest Actress in a Comedy Series	Will & Grace	Nominated	
2021	Pena de Prata	Best Supporting Actress in a Comedy Series	The Other Two	Nominated	
2021	Pena de Prata	Best Guest Actor or Actress in a Drama or Limited Series	The White Lotus	Nominated	
2021	Pena de Prata	Best Ensemble in a Limited Series or Anthology Series or TV Special	The White Lotus	Won	
2000	Primetime Emmy Awards	Outstanding Individual Performance in a Variety or Music Program	Saturday Night Live	Nominated	
2013	Primetime Emmy Awards	Outstanding Guest Actress in a Comedy Series	Enlightened (Episode: "The Ghost Is Seen")	Nominated	
2018	Primetime Emmy Awards	Outstanding Guest Actress in a Comedy Series	Will & Grace (Episode: "There's Something About Larry")	Nominated	
2018	Provincetown International Film Festival	Excellence in Acting Award	—N/a	Won	
2016	Savannah Film Festival	Spotlight Award	—N/a	Won	
2025	Screen Actors Guild Awards	Outstanding Performance by an Ensemble in a Comedy Series	Only Murders in the Building	Won	
2006	TV Guide Awards	Editor's Choice	Will & Grace	Won	
2016	Washington D.C. Area Film Critics Association Awards	Best Supporting Actress	Other People	Nominated	
