= Roads and Bridges =

2000 film by Abraham Lin

- Directed by: Abraham Lim
- Written by: Abraham Lim
- Starring: Gregory Sullivan; Abraham Lim; Soon-Tek Oh
- Cinematography: Robert Learner; Diego Quemada-Diez
- Edited by: Abraham Lim
- Release date: May 21, 2000 (Los Angeles Asian Pacific Film Festival)
- Running time: 103 minutes
- Country: United States
- Language: English

Roads and Bridges is a 2000 drama film written and directed by Abraham Lim about a Chinese-American man facing racial prejudice in the American Midwest. Johnson Lee (played by Lim) is placed on a Kansas road-cleaning crew by his parole officer. He forms a friendship with Darrell (played by Gregory Sullivan), a Black man who has experienced years of racist treatment from the white co-workers on the road crew.

The story was inspired by Lim's experience with a road crew in 1984 wherein he befriended Daryl, a Black man, and faced various forms of racism. The film was executive produced by Robert Altman.

== Plot ==
Darrell, a Black man working on a road crew who has endured years of racism from his white co-workers, is on the verge of a promotion. But when Johnson, an angry young Asian man, is assigned to his crew for the summer, Darrell is forced to confront the toll his survival tactics have taken. Due to a traumatic childhood loss, Johnson has withdrawn from the world and does not speak. He tests the limits of his own mortality in a dangerous game played on the train tracks in the dark. After Darrell rescues Lee from a river, the two men become friends and unite to overcome a mix of rage and unspeakable grief.

== Cast ==
- Gregory Sullivan as Darrell Login
- Abraham Lim as Johnson Lee
- Soon-Tek Oh as Voice of Father
- Jim Akman as Earl McCoy
- Joe Michalski as Worm
- Emmet Brennan as Buddy Williams

== Production ==
Production took six years to complete and went through three directors of photography. Lim and his crew took many trips from New York to Kansas to shoot the film. Robert Altman later came on as an executive producer after Lim edited for him on Cookie's Fortune (1999).

== Reception ==
Variety praised "Lim’s captivating, though sometimes heavy-handed" film, saying that it "succeeds in large part because of its social intelligence and core of well-delineated characters". The Daily Northwestern praised the excellent performances of Lim and Sullivan and, while noting that the six-year "length of shooting shows in the film’s evolving aesthetic, with some scenes looking amateur and others well-executed", states that the director has dealt with a "tough subject [(racism)] with aplomb".

Ted Shen for the Chicago Reader said that although the voice-overs were overly sentimental, the "twists and turns of the men's unfolding friendship are astutely paced" and "languid, stifling atmosphere of a backwater town" are meticulously crafted.

The film won the top prize at the Toronto Reel Asian International Film Festival as a western.
