= Roshan Sethi =

Canadian physician and film director

- Citizenship: Canada
- Known for: Film director, writer, physician
- Notable work: The Resident; The Simp: A Novel Without a Hero
- Spouse: Karan Soni

Roshan Sethi is a Canadian physician, writer and film director, currently working in the United States. In 2026, he published his debut novel, The Simp: A Novel Without a Hero.

== Background ==
Originally from Calgary, Alberta, Sethi is of Indian origin. He worked as a radiation oncologist at Brigham and Women's Hospital in Boston, Massachusetts, before taking some time off to write for the medical drama series Code Black.

He was a co-creator of the American medical drama series The Resident, which ran for six seasons, 2018–2023.

He still practices medicine part-time.

== Film career ==
He released his debut film 7 Days in 2021. The romantic comedy film was based in part on his experiences as a medical professional in the early days of the COVID-19 pandemic, in 2021. The film won the 2022 Independent Spirit Award for Best First Feature.

In 2022, he was a co-writer of the screenplay for Call Jane.

He directed the films World's Best in 2023, and A Nice Indian Boy in 2024. "World's Best" was nominated for a Children's and Family Emmy in 2025.

In 2026, Sethi wrote and directed The Surgeon, starring Michelle Yeoh, set for its world premiere at the 2026 Toronto International Film Festival.

== Personal life ==
Sethi came out as gay at age 30. He is married to actor Karan Soni, who has been a credited cowriter and/or cast member in all of Sethi's films to date.

== Works ==
- The Simp: A Novel Without a Hero, 2026.
