= World's Best =

2023 American musical comedy film

- Official release poster
- Directed by: Roshan Sethi
- Written by: Utkarsh Ambudkar; Jamie King
- Produced by: Thomas Kail; Utkarsh Ambudkar; Kate Sullivan
- Starring: Utkarsh Ambudkar; Manny Magnus; Punam Patel
- Cinematography: Sing Howe Yam
- Edited by: Jonah Moran
- Music by: Jongnic Bontemps; Raashi Kulkarni
- Production company: Walt Disney Pictures
- Distributed by: Disney+
- Release date: June 23, 2023
- Running time: 101 minutes
- Country: United States
- Language: English

World's Best is a 2023 American musical comedy film directed by Roshan Sethi and written by Utkarsh Ambudkar and Jamie King. It was released on Disney+ on June 23, 2023, and generally received mixed to positive reviews from critics.

== Plot ==
Prem Patel is a 12-year-old math genius who lives with his widowed mother Priya. He aims to be the best and takes high school level mathematics, which he excels at. After taking an entrance exam, Ms. Sage gives the class a homework assignment to use math to describe who they are. Prem asks Priya what his late father Suresh was like and she regales the story of how they first met when he was just an up-and-coming rapper, a dream he never got to achieve due to cancer. Prem looks at his father's old things and is suddenly visited by a manifestation of Suresh who has come to help him discover himself. Prem starts to imagine himself becoming a rapper like his father and embraces the lifestyle.

Prem's best friend, Jerome, joins up with school bullies Brooklyn and Sharn for a talent competition, and tries to avoid fellow mathematics genius Claire due to her odd appearance. Prem also joins the talent competition using the name "World's Best Emcee". He uses his father's old rhymes book to garner inspiration, but when Brooklyn and Sharn put Prem on the spot, he panics, but is rescued by older students Mercedes and Gabe who take a liking to him and bond with him over hip hop and math. Prem continues to get support and words of wisdom from Suresh who comes to him in imaginary hip hop musical moments.

While at lunch, Brooklyn and Sharn steal Suresh's book and coax a reluctant Jerome to toss in the trash, it is saved by Claire, but an angered Prem dismisses her and Priya is called by Mr. Oh where she discovers what Prem has been doing. She scolds him for becoming too obsessed with his father, but insists that he is doing exactly what he would have wanted. Prem asks Mercedes and Gabe to take him to the Leopard Lounge, the place Suresh and Priya met, only to learn that Suresh never played an open mic, despite wanting to, and was merely a bartender there. This news upsets Prem and after getting heckled by Brooklyn, tries to attack him, but breaks his arm.

Priya forbids Prem from going to the competition and that he study for the mathlympics, but he accuses her of not letting go of her husband. Prem attends the competition where he apologizes to Claire and learns that Jerome was kicked out of his dance group. Prem and Jerome make amends while Priya reads Suresh's journal and is moved by the words he wrote about her. Prem gets back to studying where he joins up with his mathlympics group, which consists of Claire, Mercedes, and Gabe. The event, held by Doug E. Fresh, goes smoothly with their team making third place, an acceptable goal as they were dead last the previous year.

Afterwards, Prem spots a group of kids rapping outside and openly joins them. As he celebrates, Priya spots Suresh's spirit and they nod in approval over Prem's goals.

== Cast ==
- Manny Magnus as Prem Patel
- Utkarsh Ambudkar as Suresh Patel, Prem's late father (and an imaginary version of him)
- Punam Patel as Priya Patel, Prem's mother
- Max Malas as Jerome, Prem's best friend and aspiring dancer
- Jake Choi as Mr. Oh, Prem's favorite teacher who previously taught him math
- Dorian Giordano as Gabe, one of Prem's high school friends
- Piper Wallace as Claire, Prem's friend who is bullied often
- Kayla Njeri as Mercedes, Prem's other high school friend who strives to be a screenwriter
- Christopher Jackson as Corey, the bartender of the Leopard Lounge
- Kathryn Greenwood as Ms. Sage, Prem's 11th-grade math teacher wants to get a podium placement in the Mathlympics
- Liam Wignall and Chris River as Sharn and Brooklyn, respectively, Jerome's friends who bully Prem
- Maya McNair as Amanda, Jerome's girlfriend
- Daniel Ryan-Astley as Student
- Nyroby Mason as Student
- Daniel Faraldo as Leopard Busboy

Neil Crone and Tricia Black cameo in the opening scene as sportscasters. Doug E. Fresh cameos as himself, being the judge for the Mathlympics.

== Production ==
Ambudkar had first pitched the film to Walt Disney Studios president Sean Bailey in February 2020. A year later, in November, a casting call was held to play the lead character Raj Patel. In April 2022, it was revealed that Roshan Sethi had signed on to direct the film. Filming was expected to begin in May.

In April 2023, Max Malas, Jake Choi, Dorian Giordano, Piper Wallace, Kayla Njeri, Christopher Jackson, Kathryn Greenwood, and Doug E. Fresh were revealed to star in the film. Jongnic Bontemps and Raashi Kulkarni scored the film.

== Release ==
World's Best was released on Disney+ on June 23, 2023.

== Reception ==
On the review aggregator website Rotten Tomatoes, 100% of 11 critics' reviews are positive, with an average rating of 7.4/10. Metacritic, which uses a weighted average, assigned the film a score of 58 out of 100, based on four critics, indicating "mixed or average" reviews.

Joel Keller of Decider said, "World's Best is a feelgood movie that the whole family can enjoy, with some great songs and funny performances by Ambudkar and Magnus. The story doesn't have the extreme highs and lows of other coming-of-age films, but that just leads to a story that more closely resembles real life than most films in this genre." James Verniere of Boston Herald gave the film a A− grade and called it a "delightful throwback to Disney's great, original, live-action films of the past," praising the screenplay and the performances of the actors.

John Sooja of Common Sense Media gave World's Best a grade of four out of five stars, praised the presence of positive messages and role models, and wrote, "Great songs, positive themes in sincere family comedy." Brandon David Wilson of RogerEbert.com gave the film a grade of three out of four stars, complimented the movie for being emotional and playful, while praising the chemistry between Manny Magnus and Utkarsh Ambudkar.
