= Jason DaSilva =

American film director

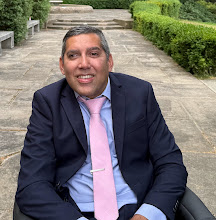
Filmmaker Jason DaSilva in New York City, 2025

Jason DaSilva (born July 26, 1978) is an American and Canadian documentary film director, producer, writer, and a disability rights community member best known for the Emmy Award-winning documentary, When I Walk. The Emmy award-winning film follows his diagnosis of primary progressive multiple sclerosis for seven years as he progresses from cane, to walker, to wheelchair. He is also the founder of the non-profit organization AXS Lab and of AXS Map, a crowd sourced Google map based platform which rates the accessibility of businesses.

== Early life ==
DaSilva was born in Dayton, Ohio, the older brother of siblings Leigh and Daniel. His mother, Marianne D'Souza, grew up in Nakuru, Kenya, and is of Goan descent. She came to the United States to go to New York University in 1970. DaSilva's father, Ed DaSilva, whose family is also from Goa, lived in Uganda but moved to Ohio to go to the University of Dayton. DaSilva's family later moved to Fort Lauderdale, Florida, before ultimately moving to Vancouver, British Columbia, Canada.

DaSilva went to high school at South Delta Secondary School. He was active in art and music and won a Delta Arts Council award that sent him to Emily Carr University of Art and Design in Vancouver Canada for his bachelor's degree in Intermedia.

After graduating in 2001, DaSilva went to New York City. His undergrad film, Olivia's Puzzle, was accepted to the Sundance film festival two years later in 2003. After Sundance, DaSilva went to Parsons School of Design for an MFA in Design and Technology. He dropped out to continue his career as a filmmaker. He completed four films over the next four years: Lest We Forget, From the Mouthpiece On Back, Twins Mankala, and A Song for Daniel.

In 2005, DaSilva was having trouble with his vision and his ability to walk. He was diagnosed with primary progressive multiple sclerosis. In 2006, he took a break from filmmaking and moved back to Vancouver. While he was there, he earned his MFA in Applied Media Arts from Emily Carr University of Art and Design, where he received a full scholarship from the Social Sciences and Humanities Research Council of Canada.

== Early filmmaking ==
At age 23, DaSilva made his first published film, a short documentary called Olivia's Puzzle. The film explored the lives of two eight-year-old girls of Indian descent, one living in North America and one living in India. Olivia's Puzzle premiered at the Sundance Film Festival, was broadcast on PBS/POV, HBO and Canadian Broadcasting Corporation (CBC) and qualified for the Academy Awards.

When the Iraqi war started in 2004, DaSilva created a short documentary entitled A Song For Daniel, comparing the lives of two Iraqi boys - one living on Long Island, New York and the other in Baghdad, Iraq. The film addressed the theme of ethnic identity retention, and how one's relationship to their home country changes with sociopolitical events, in this case the war between the U.S. and Iraq.The film premiered at the Tribeca Film Festival and was shown on PBS/POV. His next film Twins of Mankala showed the disparities of growing up Kenyan in a village versus Lowell, Massachusetts. On his next film, DaSilva worked with Asian, Arab and Muslim service agencies to tell the story of people targeted after 9/11 in his film Lest We Forget.

== Diagnosis and When I Walk Trilogy ==
When he was 25 years old, DaSilva was diagnosed with primary progressive multiple sclerosis (PPMS). PPMS is an accelerated form of multiple sclerosis that has a steady worsening of symptoms with no relapses or remissions. There is currently only one approved medication for PPMS—Ocrevus (Ocrelizumab).

In 2006, DaSilva decided to document his challenges as a filmmaker living with a degenerative neurological disease. His work became the documentary film When I Walk, an autobiographical portrait of DaSilva's struggles with multiple sclerosis and day-to-day life while losing the ability to walk over a seven-year period.

When I Walk premiered at the Sundance Film Festival in 2013 and was a Critics Pick in The New York Times, Los Angeles Times, and Village Voice. It was released theatrically and broadcast as the opening film for the 2014 season on the POV strand of PBS, received numerous awards and as of 2018, is available for viewing on Amazon Prime.

In 2015, When I Walk won an Emmy Award for Outstanding Informational Programming – Long Form, News & Documentary.

In 2019, the sequel to When I Walk was released, When We Walk, which follows Jason's life as he deals with his MS and fights to stay close with his son. The film is based on his New York Times op-ed "Mapping the Disability Trap". It premiered at the Hot Docs Film Festival, won best documentary at the Center for Asian American Media's CAAMFest, and had its New York debut at the Human Rights Watch Film Festival. DaSilva's third and final film in his documentarily trilogy on disability was titled When They Walk.

== Personal ==
As depicted in When I Walk, DaSilva met Alice Cook in 2010 at a multiple sclerosis support group. They had a son, Jase DaSilva, in 2013.

== AXS Lab and AXS Map ==
Realizing he was in a unique position as a film director with a disability, DaSilva also created a non-profit organization in 1996 called AXS Lab, Inc, whose mandate is to serve those with disabilities through the arts, media, and technology.

In 2009, DaSilva created the new media project called AXS Map that encourages communities to share reviews on the accessibility of businesses, restaurants and other public places. As described in Randy Paul Gage's book Mad Genius, DaSilva's "frustration at finding accessible restaurants, stores, restrooms, and other public spaces led him to start AXS Map, which has now morphed into a movement to map out a searchable database of accessible sites."

== Awards and honors ==
- Made in New York Award 2019
- Catalyst for Change Award- Coalition for American Asian Children & Families 2019
- Jury Panelist for White House Disability & Arts Panel 2015
- Person of the Year Award– New Mobility Magazine 2014
- Digi Award 2014
- American Association for People with Disabilities Paul E. Hearn Award 2014
- Peek Award for Disability in Film 2014
- Canada Telefilm CMF Experimental Stream Recipient 2012
- Social Sciences and Humanities Research Council Award 2007
- Emerging Innovator Award- Canada New Media Awards 2007
- Emily Award for Outstanding Alumnus 2005
- IFP Project Involve MacArthur Fellowship 2005
- Trailblazer Achievement Award- Reel World Film Festival 2004
- Peace and Racial Justice Fund 2004
- Paul Robeson Fund 2004

== Film awards ==
- Winner, Social Change Award, "When We Walk" Philadelphia Asian American Film Festival 2019
- Winner, Emmy Award, "When I Walk," Outstanding Informational Programming – Long Form, News & Documentary, 2015
- Winner, Best Canadian Documentary and Audience Award - Global Visions Film Festival 2014, "When I Walk"
- Winner, Best Canadian Feature - Hot Docs 2013, "When I Walk"
- Winner, Audience Award - Vancouver International Film Festival 2013, "When I Walk"
- Winner, Innovation Award - Topanga Film Festival 2013, "When I Walk"
- Winner, Grand Jury Prize - Los Angeles Asian Pacific Film Festival 2013, "When I Walk"
- Winner, Best Short IIAC Film Festival, "Olivia's Puzzle"
- Winner, Best Documentary, Chicago International Film Festival, "Olivia's Puzzle"
- Winner, Best Documentary, Reel2Reel Film Festival
