= The LuLu Sessions =

2011 film

The LuLu Sessions is a feature-length documentary film by S. Casper Wong about a prominent cancer researcher who is dying of breast cancer at the age of 43. Shot during the last 15 months of the life of Dr. Louise ("LuLu") Nutter, the film starts from the moment LuLu learns that her cancer is malignant and traces the emotional roller-coaster and the eye-opening process of dying. It explores human fears and presumptions, family ties and forgiveness, love and friendships, including that between Casper and LuLu, who was a professor of pharmacology at the University of Minnesota. The film has been shown in the U.S. and internationally at numerous film festivals and in conjunction with Breast Cancer Awareness Month (October).

== Production ==
The LuLu Sessions started by accident. In 2000, Casper, then a MFA Directing student at New York University's Tisch School of the Arts, made an impromptu visit to LuLu's home in Minneapolis on her way to a wedding shoot. When an oncologist called to tell LuLu that she had breast cancer, Casper started to film. Casper continued in follow-up trips to film LuLu until LuLu's death in 2001, including accompanying the researcher to her childhood farm in Vermont and as she lived her final days at the Vermont Respite House. Casper completed The LuLu Sessions in 2011.

== Film festivals and screenings ==
The 86-minute award-winning film premiered at the Los Angeles Asian American Pacific Film Festival 2011 where it was nominated for the Grand Jury Prize for Best Documentary. It has won the Audience Award for Best Documentary at the Chicago LGBT Film Festival Reeling 30; Emerging Director Award at the Asian American International Film Festival; George E. Lin Emerging Filmmaker Award and the Best Documentary Award at the DC Asian Pacific American Film Festival; Nominated for Grand Jury Award for Best Documentary at the MIX Copenhagen Film Festival; among others.

On March 4, 2014, The LuLu Sessions makes its US broadcast premiere as part of the America ReFramed Documentary Series on PBS and World Channel. The LuLu Sessions is distributed in North America by Women Make Movies. In Taiwan, by Taiwan Women's Film Association. Media coverage for the film includes a review in Variety, a "Must See" from LA Weekly, Psychology Today, SheWired, and is highly recommended by Jennifer Merin of About.com.

== Awards ==
- WINNER of Audience Award Best Feature Documentary - Chicago LGBT Film Festival Reeling 30
- WINNER of Best Documentary Feature - DC Asian Pacific Film Festival
- WINNER of George E. Lin Emerging Director Award - DC Asian Pacific Film Festival
- WINNER of Emerging Director Award - Asian American International Film Festival
- WINNER of Special Jury Award - San Diego Asian Film Festival
- WINNER of Audience Award for Best Feature Documentary - 2nd place - Toronto LGBT Film Festival
- Opening Night Film - Austin LGBT Film Festival
- Opening Night Film - Zonta Film Festival
- NOMINEE for Best Documentary Feature - Copenhagen LGBT Film Festival - MIX Copenhagen
- NOMINEE for Best Documentary Feature - Boston LGBT Film Festival
- NOMINEE for Best Documentary Feature - LA Asian American International Film Festival
