= When I Walk =

- Official poster
- Directed by: Jason DaSilva
- Written by: Jason DaSilva; Alice Cook
- Produced by: Jason DaSilva; Alice Cook; Leigh DaSilva
- Starring: Jason DaSilva; Alice Cook; Marianne D'Souza; Leigh DaSilva; Daniel DaSilva
- Cinematography: Jason DaSilva; Karin Hayes; Alice Cook; Shamsul Islam
- Edited by: Jason DaSilva; Keiko Deguchi
- Music by: Jeff Beal
- Production companies: AXS Lab; In Face Films
- Release dates: January 17, 2013 (United States); September 28, 2013 (Canada)
- Running time: 84 minutes
- Countries: Canada; United States
- Language: English

When I Walk is a 2013 autobiographical documentary film directed by Jason DaSilva. The film follows DaSilva during the seven years following his diagnosis of primary progressive multiple sclerosis. When I Walk premiered at the 2013 Sundance Film Festival, won Best Canadian Feature Documentary at the 2013 HotDocs Film Festival, and won an Emmy for the News & Documentary Emmy Award.

== Content ==
In 2006, 25-year-old established film-maker Jason DaSilva collapsed on a beach while on holiday, months after his diagnosis for multiple sclerosis. Realizing that his condition could no longer be ignored, he decided to produce a documentary. The film focuses on the changes in his relationships with his mother and partner as his condition develops.

DaSilva's story has since been expanded with a 2019 documentary sequel entitled When We Walk.

== Reception ==
=== Critical response ===
When I Walk was positively received by critics. The film was named a Critic's Pick by The New York Times and Village Voice. On review aggregator Rotten Tomatoes, the film holds an approval rating of 88% based on 17 reviews, with an average rating of 7.76/10.

=== Awards ===
- News & Documentary Emmy Award 2015 - Outstanding Informational Programming
- Best Canadian Feature - Hot Docs 2013
- Audience Award - Vancouver International Film Festival 2013
- Grand Jury Prize - Los Angeles Asian Pacific Film Festival 2013
- Best Canadian Documentary and Audience Award - Global Visions Film Festival 2014
- Social Justice Award - San Diego Asian Film Festival 2013
