= Abraham Lincoln Lim =

American filmmaker

Abraham Lim
- Education: New York University
- Occupation: Director
- Years active: 1993–present

Abraham Lincoln Lim is an American film director, editor, and actor. His NYU thesis film "Fly" won recognition at the Haig Manoogian Directors Guild of America screening, where it caught the attention of director Robert Altman, who later served as executive producer on Lim's debut feature Roads and Bridges (2000).

== Early life and education ==
Lim grew up in Overland Park, Kansas. He attended New York University's Tisch School of the Arts, where he earned both his BFA and MFA in film. During his graduate studies, his MFA thesis film Fly was selected for NYU's First Run Film Festival.

== Career ==
Lim made his directorial debut in 2000 with Roads and Bridges, which was executive produced by Robert Altman. The film screened at several major festivals including the St. Louis International Film Festival, Hamptons International Film Festival, and Los Angeles Independent Film Festival.

His 2003 short film Toy was selected for the Sundance Film Festival. In 2005, Lim received a grant from the NAATA media fund, and his screenplay Hong Kong Hero was chosen for the Tribeca All Access Connects program at the Tribeca Film Festival.

In 2006, Lim directed The Achievers, which was featured in Project Greenlight. That same year, he was named a fellow at the University of Hawaii's Academy for Creative Media.

His 2010 film God is D_ad follows young adults on a journey to a comic convention in the late 1980s. The film earned critical recognition, winning Best Feature at both the Korean Film Festival of Los Angeles and Phoenix Fan Fusion. It was also selected for screening at prestigious venues including the International Film Festival of India and the Puchon International Fantastic Film Festival.

In 2021, Lim released the documentary Shifting: Journeys Through Antarctica, which premiered at the St. Louis International Film Festival. The film was selected as the closing night film at the Korean American Film Festival New York (KAFFNY) in 2023.

== Filmography ==
=== Director ===
- Roads and Bridges (2000)
- Fists of Cheese (2002)
- The Achievers (2006)
- God is D_ad (2010)
- Where Is Wang Hao? (2015)
- Shifting: Journeys Through Antarctica (2021)
