= Off the Menu: Asian America =

- Film poster
- Directed by: Grace Lee
- Produced by: Eurie Chung
- Cinematography: Quyen Tran
- Edited by: Tina Nguyen
- Music by: Ceiri Torjussen
- Production companies: Center for Asian American Media; KQED
- Distributed by: PBS
- Release date: March 15, 2015 (CAAMFest)
- Running time: 55 minutes
- Country: United States
- Language: English

Off the Menu: Asian America is a 2015 American documentary film by Grace Lee about Asian American culture, Asian cuisine, and how they relate to the culture of the United States. It premiered in March 2015 at CAAMFest and aired on PBS in December 2015.

== Synopsis ==
Director Grace Lee travels to five states in the US to speak to Asian Americans about how food affects them and their culture. Interviews include fishers who maintain the culture of traditional Hawaiian food, community members who are mourning after the Wisconsin Sikh temple shooting, the owners of an Asian fusion restaurant in New York City, and entrepreneurs in Texas who have adapted Asian food to Southwestern tastes. Other topics include authenticity and spirituality.

== Production ==
The idea of documentary on Asian food came at Lee's suggestion when the Center for Asian American Media asked her for ideas. She wanted to explore Asian culture through a popular, accessible topic. Lee said she discusses authenticity in Asian food to point out contradictions and raise questions, such as how authenticity can define one's identity and feed model minority issues. Lee chose the locations after requesting ideas at a KQED community event. She said that the stories were chosen for diversity and to explore the various ways people interact with food. Lee described the documentary's focus as "what it means to be Asian American".

== Release ==
The film premiered at CAAMFest on March 15, 2015, and aired on PBS on December 8, 2015.

== Reception ==
Glenn Sumi of Now rated it 3/5 stars, writing that the Sikh segment makes the film "poignant and powerful" and "feel less like something you'd find on the Food Network". Hua Hsu wrote in The New Yorker that the film's questions about authenticity "suggests relative privilege", in that immigrants are not able to focus on existential questions during their initial struggles in a new culture. Hsu positions the film's chefs as part of a new Asian American tradition that rejects strict definitions of authenticity.
