= 2:00 P.M. (The Pitt season 1) =

- The Pitt episode
- Episode no.: Season 1 Episode 8
- Directed by: Amanda Marsalis
- Written by: Joe Sachs
- Cinematography by: Johanna Coelho
- Editing by: Joey Reinisch
- Production code: T76.10108
- Original air date: February 20, 2025
- Running time: 48 minutes

Guest appearances
- Amielynn Abellera as Perlah Alawi; Jalen Thomas Brooks as Mateo Diaz; Brandon Mendez Horner as Donnie Donahue; Kristin Villanueva as Princess; Mika Abdalla as Jenna; Shani Atias as Laura Fisher; Kayla Blake as Rita Kitajima; Henri Esteve as Rocco Dejulio; Courtney Grosbeck as Piper Fisher; Deepti Gupta as Dr. Eileen Shamsi; Brandon Keener as John Bradley; Krystel V. McNeil as Kiara Alfaro; Alexandra Metz as Dr. Yolanda Garcia; Marci Miller as Gina Phillips; Samantha Sloyan as Lily Bradley; Harold Sylvester as Willie Alexander; Shu Lan Tuan as Ginger Kitajima; Michele Weaver as Dolores Walker; Olivia Fokova as Bella Phillips; London Garcia as Emma Isaacs; Ernest Harden Jr. as Louie Cloverfield; Shane Hartline as Ryan Phillips; Shaw Purnell as Frances Phillips

Episode chronology
← Previous "1:00 P.M."	Next → "3:00 P.M."

"2:00 P.M." is the eighth episode of the American medical drama television series The Pitt. The episode was written by series co-executive producer Joe Sachs, and directed by co-executive producer Amanda Marsalis. It was released on Max on February 20, 2025.

The series is set in Pittsburgh, following the staff of the Pittsburgh Trauma Medical Hospital ER (nicknamed "The Pitt") during a 15-hour emergency department shift. The series mainly follows Dr. Michael "Robby" Robinavitch, a senior attending still reeling from some traumas. In the episode, Robby treats a patient with ties to Pittsburgh's history, while other members of the team attempt to resuscitate a young drowning victim. The story of patient Nick Bradley and his family also finally reaches its conclusion.

The episode received highly positive reviews from critics for its performances and themes, with Sachs receiving a nomination for Outstanding Writing for a Drama Series at the 77th Primetime Emmy Awards for his script.

== Plot ==
Collins performs an ultrasound on herself, confirming a miscarriage. Louie is brought back by paramedics, drunk and unresponsive only hours after being discharged from the Pitt. Langdon and Santos assess him, with Santos noticing he has only 10 milligrams of Librium left despite Langdon prescribing 20 mg earlier. Santos raises her concerns with Dana and Garcia. Rita returns to collect her mother. She expresses caregiver strain, so Mel and Kiara offer supportive resources.

Santos, Collins, and McKay treat Rocco, whose finger was amputated while fixing an air conditioning unit. With the crushed digit unrecoverable, McKay performs a bone rongeur and V-Y flap surgery to close the wound. Mohan informs Nandi that she does not have schizophrenia but mercury poisoning from face cream, and begins chelation therapy.

Willie Alexander, a patient with dementia, is brought in from a memory care center with an abnormal heart rate. Javadi identifies a junctional escape beat and heart block, which Mohan suspects is due to pacemaker failure. Willie surprises the staff with his medical knowledge. He shares that he was a member of the Freedom House Ambulance Service and an old friend of Dr. Adamson. When told Adamson has died, he mourns while noting Adamson’s lasting impact. Langdon diagnoses him with Twiddler's syndrome.

Garcia, Santos, and Javadi evaluate Dolores, a young woman with Crohn's disease experiencing severe abdominal pain. Frustrated by questioning, Dolores requests Dr. Shamsi, Javadi's mother. Shamsi suspects peritonitis and administers dilaudid without effect. Javadi diagnoses a Black Widow spider bite on Dolores’ foot instead.

Amber Phillips, a six-year-old girl, is brought in unresponsive after drowning. Her parents remain bedside as the team performs CPR. When her potassium reaches fatal levels, Robby declares her dead at 14:51 and stops resuscitation. Amber's younger sister Bella tells Collins and Mel that Amber saved her life after she fell into the pool.

McKay treats Piper, an assistant with dysuria brought in by her boss Laura, whose controlling behavior raises concerns of trafficking. Dana helps separate them, but Piper insists she is safe. She tests positive for chlamydia, which she attributes to an ex-boyfriend.

Kiara and Robby are informed that Nick Bradley's parents have consented to Nick’s organs being donated. Friends and staff participate in an honor walk as Nick and his family leave the hospital.

== Production ==
=== Development ===
The episode was written by series co-executive producer Joe Sachs, and directed by co-executive producer Amanda Marsalis. This marked Sachs' second writing credit, and Marsalis' third directing credit.

=== Writing ===
For the episodes closing scene, the honor walk for Nick Bradley, Noah Wyle explained that the team did extensive research to ensure it was done correctly and explained, "“We watched a lot of footage on honor walks. Honor walks are pretty spectacular to behold. The concept of organ donation is such an interesting one to delve into in real time because these decisions often have to be made very quickly because of the timeliness of needing to get organs harvested in order to get them procured and transported. You're talking about having to make the most difficult and painful decisions so fast." Series creator R. Scott Gemmill stated that the plot was co-executive producer and writer of the episode Joe Sachs' idea, explaining that "It seemed like we could get those parents of the Nick Bradley character to that point in eight hours. It's not like a show where traditionally we would have that patient come in in the first act and by a fourth act the parents would say, ‘Okay.’ We wanted to show that process of coming to terms with a loved one is, one, not coming back, but then you're being asked to donate their organs to help other people. For some people, that's very difficult because they still believe the sanctity of this body, of this loved one, and how do we get them there? It was a powerful episode." Wyle added that, "it was also “a really good and gut-wrenching way to extend the fentanyl tragedy [and] storyline even farther, to try to find some aspects of meaning and value in the tragedy in that, even though they're going to lose their son, their son is going to make it possible for 18 other people to maybe not have similar fates. The honor walk sort of underscores the tragedy, but also the heroism and the bravery of the decision and the humanity of how this boy's eyes, this boy's liver, this boy's lungs, this boy's [other organs] are going to go into other people. We can be interchanged like that. You get underneath the surface of our skin color, I can have your heart, you can have my kidney. We can exchange these things and survive them. I think that's an incredible thesis to underscore. You want to talk about our differences all day long. We can save each other's lives on the most biological level, but we can't seem to do it on a practical level."

=== Filming ===
Discussing the honor walk, Isa Briones explained, "The pace of the show is so fast that the moments where we take a breath are so powerful. That was a very beautiful moment. That storyline really lasts so long, and it's a beautiful storyline and it is really something that I think grounds so much of the show. It's a moment where no matter where you were, everyone came together and everyone felt the weight of that. Even someone like Santos, who keeps away from the emotional, it's like, we’re all going to accept that this is a horrible thing and this is a moment for us to be silent. And it was very emotional. Anytime I was in the vicinity of that storyline, I couldn't help but cry. And I was like, ‘Oh, Santos wouldn't do this. Santos wouldn't do this.’ Stuff like that happens in a hospital because no matter what, even if you see terrible things, see death every day, stuff like that, still you have to honor it because it's a life. It's a life that was lost. And that's never easy." Katherine LaNasa agreed with Briones, and praised the performances of Brandon Keener and Samantha Sloyan, who played Nick's parents, noting, "That was really painful, and I remember just feeling so full of emotion and tears that day. There's a part of playing this role that dives into the deepest part of you every day, and it's not a bad thing, but it really opens you up because even though these charge nurses have a sort of efficiency of emotion in order to be able to deal with a trauma, then deal with another trauma and deal with another trauma, they're incredibly compassionate people. “They wouldn't do it otherwise. I remember that day really, really striking me. It was a very painful day, very teary day for everybody. You didn't even have to try. It was so unbelievably sad."

== Critical reception ==
"2:00 P.M." received positive reviews from critics. Laura Bogart of The A.V. Club gave the episode a "B" grade and wrote, "Loss hangs over almost every aspect of this episode, from the opening scene of Dr. Collins composing herself after miscarrying in the hospital bathroom to the final one of Nick Bradley, the young man who accidentally overdosed on fentanyl, on his honor walk to donate organs. Although some forms are devastatingly literal, like the six-year-old who drowns while saving her sister, others are more interior and, in some cases, cathartic." Bogart praised the performances of the cast, specifically Ifeachor, Gerran Howell, Dearden, and Wyle, as well as the theme of loss which ran throughout the episode, and Willie's storyline for highlighting local Pittsburgh history.

Nick Bythrow of Screen Rant concluded that, "Episode 8 maintains everything that makes the series so engaging, daring to go in more upsetting directions to show the realism of what can happen at a trauma hospital. The careful balance of life is displayed through the many different types of cases in episode 8 promises deeper importance as the series continues to develop. But, with some stories like Collins' pregnancy and David still being absent from the show, it's only a matter of time until a new wave of challenges washes over the team."

Praising the performances of Keener, Sloyan, and Dearden, and Willie's storyline honoring the work of Freedom House, Emma Fraser of Episodic Medium highlighted the mirroring storylines of Nick and Amber, and how both fit into one of the series' central themes of loss, writing "Nick Bradley's storyline has spanned all eight episodes, and the honor guard as the braindead 18-year-old leaves the hospital for the organ donation center is more impactful as a result of this multi-episode arc. Having it juxtapose the death of a child who only just came in further highlights differing storyline approaches within the single-shift format. Both are emotional gut punches."
