= Lakshmi Iyer =

Indian-American writer and essayist

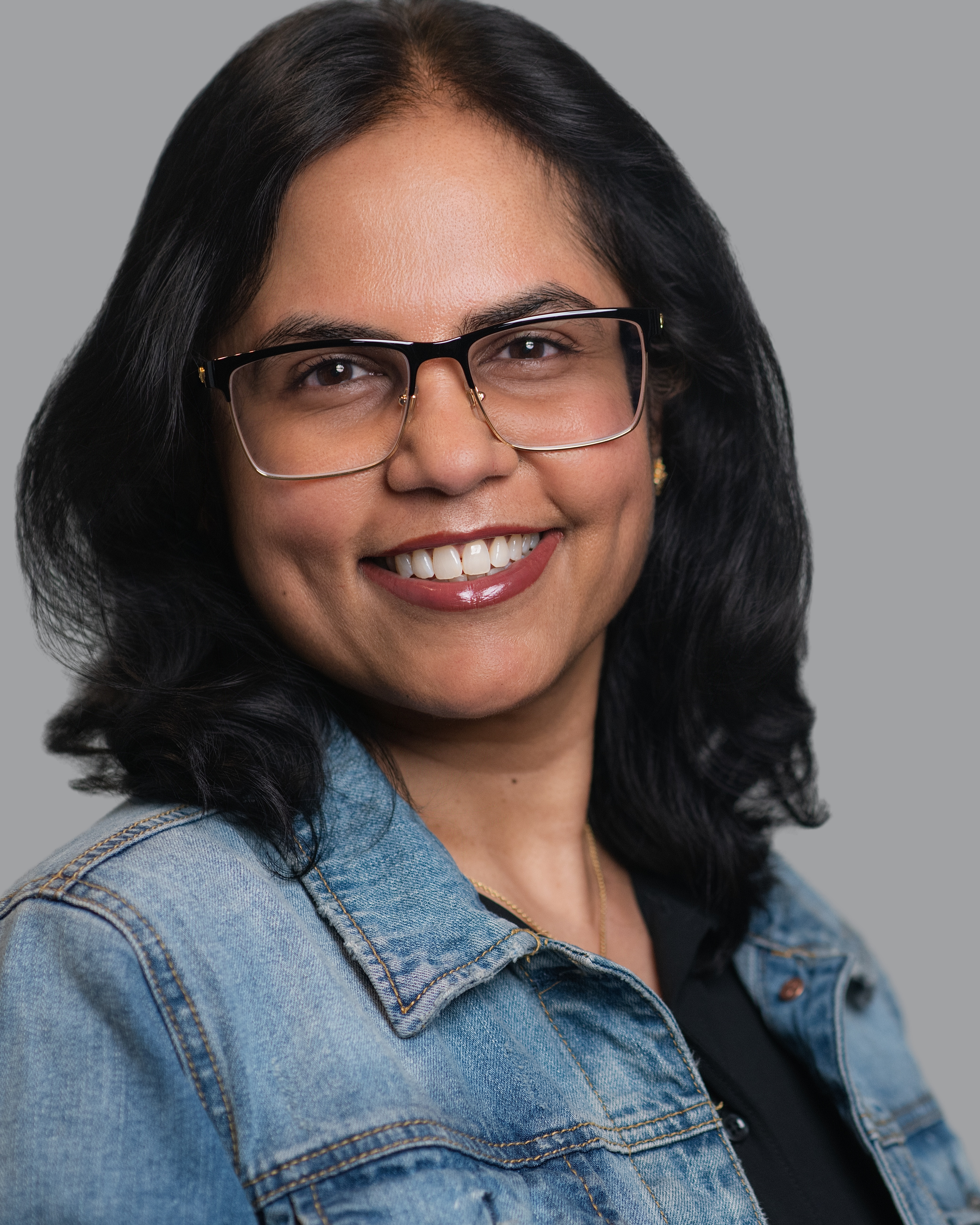
Iyer in 2026

Lakshmi Iyer is an Indian-American writer, essayist, and children's book author. Her debut children's book, Why Is My Hair Curly? (2020), addresses themes of adoption, identity, and belonging through the perspective of a young protagonist. Iyer is a central subject of the documentary film Love Chaos Kin (2025), directed by Chithra Jeyaram, which premiered at CAAMFest in May 2025.

== Early life and education ==
Iyer was born in Tamil Nadu, India, and grew up in Coimbatore and Madras (now Chennai). She holds a bachelor's degree in applied sciences with majors in mathematics, physics, and chemistry, and an MBA from the LeBow College of Business at Drexel University. She is an alumna of the Yale Writers' Workshop (2018) and holds a certificate in creative writing from Simon Fraser University.

== Career ==
Iyer began her professional career in India as a printed circuit board designer, later joining Wipro in Bangalore as a software engineer. After moving to the United States in 2001, she worked for PNC Bank, Accenture, and FIS, among others, and is currently a business analyst.

Her writing career began with personal blogs and developed into a body of essays and fiction. She is the author of the newsletter Belonging, Mostly on Substack, which addresses adoption, Tamil-American identity, and family.

== Books ==
=== Why Is My Hair Curly? (2020) ===
Iyer's debut children's book, Why Is My Hair Curly?, was published in 2020 by Westland Books under its Red Panda children's imprint. It is illustrated by Niloufer Wadia. The story follows a young girl named Avantika, who is adopted and whose curly hair is the bane of her existence. Reviews appeared in The Hindu, Mutha Magazine, and Brown Girl Magazine. The book was included in the 2025 Week feature on Indian writers exploring bold themes for young readers.

=== Other works ===
Iyer has also published the novels Hindsight (2024) and A Star Keeps Its Distance (2026), the latter following a journalist protagonist covering a K-pop group. Her essay collection The Smudged Hyphen and novel A Star Keeps Its Distance were released in 2026.

== Selected essays and journalism ==
Iyer's essays and interviews have appeared in The Hindu, The Indian Express, Financial Express, The Week, Verve (India), HuffPost, India Abroad, Adoptive Families, Motherwell Magazine, and Mutha Magazine. She has been featured on NPR's The Takeaway and on the BBC Asian Network's Big Debate programme.

== Documentary subject ==
Iyer and her family are the subjects of Love Chaos Kin (2025), a feature documentary directed by Chithra Jeyaram of Realtalkies, CAAM-funded, that follows the family's experience of transracial adoption over more than a decade. The film had its world premiere as a Centerpiece selection at CAAMFest 2025 in San Francisco and its East Coast premiere at the Brooklyn Film Festival in June 2025.

The film has played at numerous festivals, including the Asian American International Film Festival, the Maryland Film Festival, the Beloit International Film Festival, the Cucalorus Film Festival, the Centre Film Festival, and the Bare Bones International Independent Film & Music Festival. Upcoming festivals confirmed by the production include the Seattle International Film Festival (Washington premiere, 2026), the South Asian Film Festival of Montreal (Canadian premiere, 2026), and the Houston Asian American Pacific Islander Film Festival (Texas premiere, 2026).

Love Chaos Kin has received the AICEF Prize for Cross-Cultural Filmmaking at the Middlebury New Filmmakers Festival, the Audience Award for Best Feature Documentary at the Chicago South Asian Film Festival, and the Made in PA Audience Award at the Centre Film Festival, among other honors.

A review of the documentary in Mediaversity Reviews described Iyer as "a wonderful guide who lets viewers in on her thought process of raising multicultural girls." Film Festival Today gave the documentary four out of five stars and noted that the film draws on an essay Iyer wrote for HuffPost in 2017.

== Personal life ==
Iyer lives in Pennsylvania with her husband and three children.

== Bibliography ==
=== Children's books ===
- Why Is My Hair Curly? Westland (Red Panda imprint), 2020. ISBN 9789389648119.

=== Fiction ===
- Hindsight, 2024.
- A Star Keeps Its Distance, 2026.

=== Essays ===
- The Smudged Hyphen, 2026.
