= Quyen Tran =

American cinematographer and director

- Education: UCLA
- Occupations: Director, Cinematographer
- Spouse: Sam Riegel
- Children: 2
- Website: www.qtranfilms.com

Quyen Tran (/ˈkwiːɛn/ KWEE-en) is an American director and cinematographer based in Los Angeles. She has worked on multiple Sundance films such as Palm Springs, The Little Hours and Deidra & Laney Rob a Train.

== Early life and education ==
Tran's parents were refugees from South Vietnam. After witnessing the 9/11 attacks in New York City, Tran applied to film school and was accepted to UCLA. Roger Deakins was a cinematographer-in-residence at the time of her attendance and became one of her mentors.

== Career ==
=== Photography ===
Tran began her artistic career as a still photographer. Her photos have appeared in the New York Times, LA Times, USA Today, New York Post, New York Daily News, Dateline NBC, HBO's In Memoriam, BBC, CNN International News, PBS, Sacramento Bee, The Age (Australia), Scientific American, Variety, TV Guide, and more. She was nominated for the World Press Photo Award.

=== Film and television ===
Tran has worked as a director and cinematographer on short films, television, and full-length films. In 2021, Tran became a member of the American Society of Cinematographers.

== Awards and honors ==
- Best Cinematography UCLA Spotlight: 2008, 2007, 2006
- Best Feature Cinematography – Wild Rose Film Festival
- Federico de Laurentiis Memorial Scholarship
- National Theater Goers Alliance Scholarship

== Personal life ==
Tran is bilingual, fluent in English and Vietnamese. Tran is Catholic. She is married to voice actor Sam Riegel and they have two children.

== Filmography ==
=== Film ===
Year	Title	Director	Notes	Ref.
2008	Vietnam Overtures	Stephane Gauger		
2009	16 to Life	Becky Smith		
2009	The People I've Slept With	Quentin Lee		
2010	Troublemaker	Geeta Malik		
2010	Girlfriend	Justin Lerner		
2011	A Bag of Hammers	Brian Crano		
2011	Mulberry Child	Susan Morgan Cooper		
2013	Free Ride	Shana Sosin		
2013	American Revolutionary: The Evolution of Grace Lee Boggs	Grace Lee	2014 Peabody Award	
2015	Off the Menu: Asian America	Grace Lee		
2015	Pali Road	Jonathan Lim		
2015	The Automatic Hate	Justin Lerner		
2016	The Night Stalker	Megan Griffiths		
2016	To The Moon & Back	Susan Morgan Cooper		
2017	Deidra & Laney Rob A Train	Sydney Freeland		
2017	The Little Hours	Jeff Baena		
2018	Dark Was the Night (formerly Behold My Heart)	Joshua Leonard		
2020	Life in a Year	Mitja Okorn		
2020	Palm Springs	Max Barbakow		
2024	Brothers	Max Barbakow		
	Kingship	Julien Favre		

=== Television ===
Year	Title	Episodes	Notes	Ref.
2008	Imaginary Bitches	13	Season 1, Episodes 1–13	Emmy Nomination
2009	Atom TV	1	Episode 2.1	
2012	Dark Wall	2	"Whispers" "Home: A Ghost Story"	
2015	Dr. Mona Vand: The Modern Pharmacist	1	"Is There a Difference Between Physical Dependence and Addiction?"	
2018	Camping	8	[All 8 episodes]	
2018	Here and Now	5	"It's Coming"; "If a Deer Sh*ts in the Woods"; "Fight, Death"; "Wake"; "Dream Logic"	
2019	Unbelievable	3	Episodes 1.1–1.3	
2020	A Teacher	10	All 10 episodes	
2021	Maid	4 as Cinematographer 1 as Director	As Cinematographer: "Dollar Store"; "Ponies"; "Sky Blue"; "Snaps"; As Director: "Bear Hunt"	
2022	Minx	1	"Not like a shvantz right in the race"	
2022	Roar	2 as Cinematographer 1 as Director	As Cinematographer: "The Woman Who Found Bite Marks on Her Skin"; "The Woman Who Solved Her Own Murder"; As Director: "The Woman Who Returned Her Husband"	
2023	Ahsoka	2	"Part Two: Toil and Trouble"; "Part Three: Time to Fly"	
2024	The Emperor of Ocean Park	2 as director	As Director: "Chapter Seven"; "Chapter Eight"	
2024	The Madness	2 as director	As Director: "Icarus"; "No More Madness"	
2025	The Pitt	2 as director	As Director: "3:00 P.M."; "5:00 P.M."	
2025	Sirens	2 as Director	As Director: "Monster"; "Persephone"	
2025	The Twisted Tale of Amanda Knox	2 as Director	As Director: "U Were There"; "Libertà"	
2026	The Testaments	2 as Director	As Director: "Green Tea"; "Ball"	
2026	Crystal Lake	2 as Director	As Director: "Friday..."; "The Final Chapter"	

=== Shorts ===
Year	Title	Director	Notes	Ref.
2005	Echostop	Justin Lerner		
2006	Chinese Dumplings	Michelle Hung		
2006	Hurricane Party	AP Gonzalez		
2006	Maggie's Not Here	Justin Lerner		
2007	A Watermelon Seed (Gua zi)	Miqi Huang		
2007	Beast	Geeta Malik		
2007	Joburg	Thabo Wolfaardt		
2009	The Fence	Matt Silas		
2009	Waiting Room	Katharine O'Brien		
2009	The Empty Space in Between	Maria Tornberg		
2013	Noel	Joe Holt		
2014	The Learning Curve	Phil McCarty		
2015	SMILF	Frankie Shaw	Winner, Jury Award for Sundance Shorts	
2019	Stucco	Janina Gavankar Russo Schelling		
	Keystone	Brandon Fayette		
	Monkey	Yoshie Suzuki		
	Swallow	Emily Taylor-Mortorff		

=== Documentaries ===
Year	Title	Role	Crew role, notes	Ref.
2011	"Sam Riegel and Quyen Tran on 9/11"	Herself	Documentary footage on 9/11 attack, used in 102 Minutes That Changed America and other documentaries	
