= Alveoloplasty =

Dental surgical procedure

Alveoloplasty is a surgical pre-prosthetic procedure performed to facilitate removal of teeth, and smoothen or reshape the jawbone for prosthetic and cosmetic purposes. In this procedure, the bony edges of the alveolar ridge and its surrounding structures is made smooth, redesigned or recontoured so that a well-fitting, comfortable, and esthetic prosthesis may be fabricated or implants may be surgically inserted. This pre-prosthetic surgery which may include bone grafting prepares the mouth to receive a prosthesis or implants by improving the condition and quality of the supporting structures so they can provide support, better retention and stability to the prosthesis.

After tooth extraction, the residual crest irregularities, undercuts or bone spicules should be removed, because they may result in an obstruction in placing a prosthetic restorative appliance. Recontouring can be made at the time of extraction or at a later time.

== History ==
In 1853: Willard described the procedure of contouring the alveolar bone and alveolar mucosa in order to achieve primary wound closure in preparation for future denture placement. His statement mentioned the purpose of this procedure is to allow bone and tissue of patient to heal faster.

In 1876: Beers described radical alveolectomy with cutting forceps. However, this technique has been classified as too aggressive due to great amount of bone loss after surgical procedure. Hence, nowadays, this particular procedure is not favourable.

In 1919: Armin Wald of New York City was among the first oral and maxillofacial surgeons in the United States to successfully perform the operation and publish his widely accepted procedure.

In 1923: Dean claimed that his technique aim to preserve the labial cortex and contoured intraradicular bone. His technique does not include mucoperiosteal dissection and therefore, patient will experience less pain, swelling and bone resorption.

In 1976: Michael and Barsoum researched on patients who had immediate denture placement. They related the amount of bone resorption in relation with different surgical techniques. The above-mentioned surgical techniques include extraction without alveoplasty, extraction with labial alveolectomy, and extraction with intraseptal alveoplasty as described by Dean in 1923. The result of their study showed labial alveoloplasty had the most bone resorption occurring at the procedure area.

== Indications ==
The main purpose of alveoloplasty procedure is to recontour and restructure alveolar bone to provide a functional skeletal relationship.

Indications of alveoloplasty should nevertheless include recontouring or reshaping alveolar bone during tooth extraction surgery. For instance, if alveolar bone has sharp edges after tooth removal, it is necessary to smoothen the bone surfaces to facilitate tooth socket healing process and to avoid any procedural complications such as pain or long standing open wound.

The next indication for alveoloplasty involves a standalone procedure which is usually done prior to treatment planning of any prosthetic appliances such as placement of fixed or removable prosthetic appliances. In relation with the first point of indication of the procedure, the bone contouring after dental extractions also helps in preparation for prosthetic rehabilitation. This serves as an important procedure as any sharp bony projections under removable appliances such as dentures will cause discomfort and pain when patient perform masticatory functions.

The main essence of prosthetic rehabilitation in regard to alveoloplasty is maintaining the width and height of alveolar ridge so that it will provide stability and retention for prosthesis such as denture and even dental implants as the forces acting from the prostheses will be distributed evenly on the alveolar mucosa and alveolar ridge. In another point of view, alveoloplasty serves as debulking procedures for some pathologic conditions of the jaw bone as well.

== Contraindications and Limitations ==
Alveoloplasty is contraindicated in situations whereby vital structures such as nerve bundle, blood vessel and/or vital tooth will be harmed during removal of bone structure. Nerve injury is unfavourable as there will be a risk of complications such as paraesthesia, neuropathic pain, allodynia and others. In addition to this, if there is existing diminished volume or atypical architecture of bone; alveoloplasty is not a recommended procedure as well.

Some important points to be included as contraindications of alveoloplasty consist of individuals who have undergone head and neck radiation therapy or individuals with medical condition which will result in certain medical complications such as uncontrolled or excessive bleeding, poor healing response or immunocompromised. As a reference, patient who has underlying bleeding disorder or individuals who are currently on anticoagulant medications has risk of uncontrolled bleeding; whilst individuals with uncontrolled diabetes or infection has poor healing response after procedure.

== Armamentarium ==
1. Bone rongeurs
  - Has sharp blades which are squeezed together by the handles to cut the bone.
  - Major designs which are side-cutting forceps and side and end-cutting forceps
  - Can be used to remove large amounts of bone efficiently
2. Bone file
  - Double ended instrument
  - Cannot be used for removal of large amount of bone and only used for final smoothing.
  - Teeth of the bone files are designed in a fashion that bone can be smoothened by pull stroke only
  - Pushing stroke of bone files can cause crushing of bone and this should be avoided.
3. Rotary burs and handpieces

== Preoperative Planning ==
The clinical examination focuses on bony projections and undercuts, large palatal and mandibular tori, and other gross ridge abnormalities. A dentist should always evaluate the interarch relationship in 3 dimensions while doing treatment planning for denture patients. Radiographs examinations are indicated for any retained root tips, impacted teeth, bony pathology and impacted teeth to minimise post denture insertion discomfort. The degree of maxillary sinus pneumatization, and the position of the inferior alveolar canal and mental foramina are important as well to avoid impingement of denture on these vital structures which may trigger more problems to the patient.

=== Simple Alveoloplasty ===
At the time of extraction or after healing and bone remodeling has happened, alveolar bone irregularities may be found. The goal for alveoloplasty is to achieve optimal tissue support for the planned prosthesis, while preserving as much bone and soft tissue as possible.

Simple alveoloplasty can be done in conjunction with or after extraction of teeth. Gross irregularities of bone contour are usually found in the area after extraction. It is typically indicated to remove sharp edges, bony prominences, or undercuts prior to prosthetic rehabilitation.

The degree of bony abnormality will dictate the most effective method for alveoloplasty. Smaller irregularities at an extraction site may only require digital compression of the socket walls. Greater bony defects should be removed by raising an envelope flap to expose the bony areas requiring recontouring. Along the ridge crest, mucoperiosteal incision is done to gain sufficient access and visualisation of the alveolar ridge.

=== Intraseptal Alveoloplasty ===
This technique is also known as Dean’s technique. Rather than removal of excessive or irregular areas of labial cortex, it involves the removal of intraseptal bone and repositioning of labial cortical bone.

This technique is commonly used in an area where the ridge is of relatively regular contour and adequate height but presents an undercut to the depth of the labial vestibule because of the anatomic variations of the alveolar ridge.

There are a few advantages in this technique. The muscle attachments to the area of alveolar ridge can be left undisturbed. Postoperative bone resorption and remodeling can be reduced as the periosteal attachment to the underlying bone is maintained. The height of the ridge can be preserved while reducing the labial prominence of the alveolar ridge.

=== Maxillary Tuberosity Reduction ===
Maxillary tuberosity is a rounded eminence which can be prominent after the eruption of third molars. Maxillary tuberosity is important for the stability of the upper complete denture. Maxillary tuberosity reduction can be soft tissue in nature due to the thick alveolar mucosa in the region or hard tissue related.

There can be vertical or lateral excess of the maxillary tuberosity. Proper orientation of occlusal plane and teeth can be interrupted by vertical excess. The lateral excess limit the thickness of the buccal flange of denture between itself and the coronoid process and also cause problems in path of insertion. Examination of mounted diagnostic cast is mandatory to assess the amount of removal.

When the tuberosity is enlarged, undercuts on the buccal aspect of the maxillary tuberosity are frequently found, complicating the successful fabrication of upper complete denture. An enlarged tuberosity can make posterior palatal seal hard to achieve, affecting the stability of the upper denture. Recontouring of maxillary tuberosity may be necessary to remove the bony undercuts or to create adequate interarch space for good construction of prosthesis at the posterior regions.

=== Mylohyoid Ridge Reduction ===
Mylohyoid ridge is a ridge on the inner side of the bone of the lower jaw extending from the junction of the two halves of the bone in front of the last molar on each side. When there is loss of posterior teeth, the alveolar ridge gets resorbed, causing extremely sharp ridge and making the mylohyoid ridge prominent. Denture may cause pressure on that area, producing significant pain in this area. Tonicity of the mylohyoid ridge itself can cause problems with denture retention. Mylohyoid ridge reduction is indicated whenever the alveolar ridge is at the same level or higher level than the alveolar process.

=== Genial Tubercle Reduction ===
As the mandible begins to undergo resorption, the area of the attachment of the genioglossus muscle in the anterior portion of the mandible may become prominent. Before a decision to remove this prominence is made, consideration should be given to possible augmentation of the anterior portion of the mandible rather than reduction of the genial tubercle. If augmentation is the preferred treatment, the tubercle should be left to add support to the graft in this area. Local anesthetic infiltration and bilateral lingual nerve blocks should provide adequate anesthesia.

== Clinical Procedure ==
The simplest form of alveoloplasty can be in the form of a digital compression on the lateral walls of bone after simple tooth extraction, provided that there are no gross bone irregularities. When more irregularities exist, other techniques can be adopted, such as the conservative technique, interseptal (Dean's) alveoloplasty, Obwegeser's modification of interseptal, alveoloplasty after post extraction and the alveoloplasty performed on edentulous ridges. In cases where there are severe undercuts, radical alveoloplasty is required. This involves the removal of the whole buccal or labial plate after extraction. In addition, secondary alveoloplasty sometimes occurs after the initial procedure to eliminate any gross bone irregularities.

A full thickness flap is usually elevated to a point apical to the desired area to be contoured, and according to the amount of bone needed to be removed, a bone file, or a bone rongeur, or a burr under copious irrigation can be used to provide the desired contour. Taking in consideration that lack of irrigation can lead to bone necrosis. When finished, the flap is repositioned and sutured. The alveolar mucosa covering bone should have uniform thickness, density and compressibility to evenly distribute the masticatory forces to the underlying bone.

== Postoperative Considerations ==
In any surgery, the most common complications include pain, swelling, infection and bleeding. Besides that, if operative site is approximating vital structures such as nerve bundle, clinicians should access nerve injury at the time of surgery and/or keep reviewing those patients for assessment and management of the condition. However, sequestra may result due to excessive thin bone which fail to be revascularized, and will eventually lead to delay wound healing, infection and pain. If prosthetic rehabilitation is in the treatment plan, proper tissue healing should be achieved before construction of removable prosthesis. In cases whereby immediate denture is indicated, clinicians could consider the option of relining the immediate denture to allow appropriate soft tissue healing.
