= Ty Burr =

American film critic (b. 1957)

- Born: August 17, 1957 (age 69); Boston, Massachusetts, U.S.
- Education: Dartmouth College; New York University
- Occupations: Film critic; writer
- Years active: 1982–present

Ty Burr (born August 17, 1957) is an American film critic, columnist, and author who reviews films for The Washington Post and writes the film and popular culture newsletter "Ty Burr's Watchlist". Burr worked as a film critic at The Boston Globe from 2002 until 2021.

== Early life ==
Born on August 17, 1957, in Boston, Burr grew up in Brookline, Massachusetts. He studied film at Dartmouth College and New York University.

== Career ==
From 1982 to 1987, Burr worked at Home Box Office, where he helped program the Cinemax pay cable service as a film evaluator. From 1990 to 2002, he was a senior writer at Entertainment Weekly (EW), where he primarily covered films, video, music, and digital media. An early interest in the Internet led to his hand-coding EW's first webpage and introducing and editing the magazine's New Media section.

From 2002 to 2021, Burr served as the film critic for The Boston Globe. Beginning in January 2015, he also wrote a weekly Sunday column on pop culture. His columns on breaking cultural issues frequently appeared on the paper's front page. In 2017, Burr was a finalist for the Pulitzer Prize in criticism.

In July 2021, Burr left the Globe to start "Ty Burr's Watch List", an online newsletter devoted to reviews of and commentary on theatrical and streaming films, TV, and other popular culture. He also reviews movies for The Washington Post and contributes criticism and other articles to The Wall Street Journal, The New York Times, and other publications.

Burr is a member of the Boston Society of Film Critics and the National Society of Film Critics. He has written articles for The New York Times, Spin, and The Boston Phoenix, among other publications. He has appeared on NECN, MSNBC, WGBH's Greater Boston, NPR's Here and Now, Bloomberg Radio, and other local and national radio programs to discuss films and cultural matters. Every month, Burr hosts Ty Burr's Movie Night at the West Newton Cinema in West Newton, Massachusetts.

=== Published works ===
Burr has written or contributed to five books. The Hundred Greatest Stars of All Time (1998) and The Hundred Greatest Movies of All Time (1999) are Entertainment Weekly "bookazines" written largely by Burr (with additional material by other staff writers) during his tenure at the magazine.

In 2007, Burr wrote The Best Old Movies for Families: A Guide to Watching Together, an essay-based reference book for parents and grandparents seeking to introduce children to classic films. It received uniformly positive reviews from critics and readers. In 2012, Burr wrote Gods Like Us: On Movie Stardom and Modern Fame, a critical study of celebrity over 100 years of film and cultural history. It was widely and positively reviewed. The New York Times wrote, "not many film historians can see the whole equation as Ty Burr does in Gods Like Us" and the Buffalo News called it a "brilliant and even profound history of stardom".

In 2012, Burr published the e-book The 50 Movie Starter Kit: What You Need to Know if You Want to Know What You're Talking About, a guide for beginning film lovers.

== Bibliography ==
- The Hundred Greatest Stars of All Time. New York: Entertainment Weekly Books, 1999. ISBN 9781883013684
- The Best Old Movies for Families: A Guide to Watching Together. New York: Anchor Books, 2007. ISBN 9781400096862
- Gods Like Us: On Movie Stardom and Modern Fame. New York: Pantheon Books, 2012. ISBN 9780307377661
- The 50 Movie Starter Kit: What You Need to Know if You Want to Know What You're Talking About. New York: Anchor Books (eBook), 2012. ISBN 9780345804945
