= Barrier Device =

- Directed by: Grace Lee
- Written by: Grace Lee
- Produced by: Caroline Libresco; Rosie Wong
- Starring: Sandra Oh; Suzy Nakamura
- Cinematography: Patricia Lee
- Edited by: Grace Lee
- Music by: Billy Cote; Mary Lorson
- Release date: March 2002 (CAAMFest)
- Running time: 26 minutes
- Country: United States
- Language: English

"Barrier Device" is a 2002 short film written and directed by Grace Lee. It stars Sandra Oh as a sex researcher and Suzy Nakamura as a subject. It won four awards, including the silver medal at the 29th Student Academy Awards.

== Plot ==
Researcher Audrey conducts a study on female condoms. In the course of her work, she discovers that Serena, one of her subjects, is romantically involved with her ex-fiancé. Torn between professional integrity and curiosity, Audrey attempts to learn more about Serena's life without compromising her work.

== Cast ==
- Sandra Oh as Audrey
- Suzy Nakamura as Serena
- Melinda Peterson as Dr. Campbell
- Jonathan Liebhold as Dwight
- Brian Kim as Brian

== Production ==
Barrier Device was Grace Lee's master's thesis at UCLA. Lee directly asked Oh to appear in her film.

== Release ==
Barrier Device premiered at the 2002 CAAMFest.

== Reception ==
=== Awards ===
| Year | Organization | Award | Recipient | Result | Ref |
|---|---|---|---|---|---|
| 2002 | Student Academy Awards | Silver medal | Grace Lee | Won | |
| 2002 | Urbanworld Film Festival | Grand Jury Prize | Grace Lee | Won | |
| 2002 | Palm Springs International Film Festival | Best Short over 15 Minutes | Grace Lee | Won | |
| 2002 | Directors Guild of America | Best Asian American Film | Grace Lee | Won | |
| 2002 | San Diego Asian Film Festival | Best Narrative Short | Barrier Device | Won | |
