= Phoenix14news =

Phoenix14News is a student-run newscast and one of several media organizations that are a part of ESTV at Elon University in Elon, North Carolina.

Phoenix14 members pursue new and original stories each week and live action broadcasts cover stories that go "Beyond the Headlines." Students obtain, investigate, report and produce all content for a weekly show airing Monday evenings at 6pm on Elon's Campus. Production meetings are held Tuesday evenings at 6:00pm.

== Format ==
To provide the most relevant news to Elon students and the local community, the show is broken up into four blocks. These blocks are separated by commercial breaks ranging in length from one minute to two minutes.

The A-block contains the show's welcome and usually the breaking news stories. These news stories are usually local stories. Right before the first break, there are teases for features and stories that will come later in the show.

The B-block follows the first commercial break and contains soft news. These reports may sometimes be of national news, but more often they are local stories. The economy is featured in this block with recurring segments such as "Pump Patrol" and "Common Cents".

The C-block follows the second commercial break. It contains a weather segment with a 10-day forecast, and a brief look at national weather. The C-Block contains feature stories and creative pieces.

The D-block is known as the Sports Block as it is filled with only sports related reporting and contains highlights from previous weeks' games. There is usually a unique sports story that is featured in each show, as well as occasional live interviews.

== Student involvement ==
The role of a student in Phoenix 14 varies from week to week, however there are some set positions. Each semester, one student is appointed News Director, Senior Executive Producer, Assignment Manager, and Sports Producer. These positions are held for the fall and spring semester, though they can be held longer. + The role of a student in Phoenix 14 is different from week to week, however there are set positions available for rotation. Each spring, the students, along with Advisor Rich Landesberg, choose their News Director and Executive Producer for each upcoming school year.
- News Anchors change on a yearly basis. Each spring auditions for anchor and sports anchor are held. The auditions are taped and sent to a news director with no affiliation to the show. The news director selects the news anchors and the sports anchor for the upcoming year. The anchor positions are maintained for the fall & spring semesters. During Elon's Winter Term, the anchors get a break, and new anchors are picked specifically for Winter Term. Auditions are held, and current Phoenix14 members select the Winter anchors. The studio's staffing and equipment follows industry standards, and includes Reporters, Producers, Directors, Technical Directors, Floor Directors, Camera operators, Audio Techs, and CG Graphics.

== Awards and recognition ==
In the fall of 2008, Phoenix14News was named "Number 1 Student Newscast" and took the top honor of "Best of Festival" award by the Broadcasting Education Association. A number of reporters were also given individual awards at this time. They took "Top Newscast" in 2005 and 2006 as well. The show as a whole has won several awards and individual members have also been awarded and recognized for their stories over the years.

- 2005, recognition at the 20th annual Aegis Awards
- 2006, 27th annual Telly Awards
- 2007, Radio-Television News Directors Association of the Carolinas (RTNDAC) Award for "Best Student Television Newscast".
- 2008, Radio-Television News Directors Association of the Carolinas (RTNDAC) 1st place award for Best Student Sportcast and 2nd place award for Best Student News Story
- 2008, 29th annual Telly Awards.
- 2008, Broadcasting Education Association, 3rd place for TV Newscast
- 2009, Broadcasting Education Association, #1 College Newscast in the Nation, and Best of Festival
