= The Grace Lee Project =

- Promotional release poster
- Directed by: Grace Lee
- Written by: Grace Lee; Amy Ferraris
- Produced by: Grace Lee
- Narrated by: Grace Lee
- Cinematography: Jerry A. Henry
- Edited by: Amy Ferraris
- Music by: Woody Pak
- Production company: Leelee Films
- Distributed by: Women Make Movies
- Release date: March 11, 2005 (CAAMFest)
- Running time: 68 minutes
- Country: United States
- Language: English

The Grace Lee Project is a 2005 American documentary film directed and co-written by Grace Lee. It is about Lee's attempt to define a common set of stereotypes associated with the name that she shares with the film's subjects.

== Synopsis ==
Growing up in Columbia, Missouri, director Grace Lee felt that she had a unique name and identity, as there were not many other Asians in her community. When she moved to New York City and Los Angeles, she found her name shared by many other people. In her quest to uncover how the Western name “Grace” became ubiquitous among Asian Americans, the filmmaker speaks with many subjects named Grace Lee, soon learning the name’s Hollywood origins, as well as its Christian roots. Dissatisfied with the "nice" personality commonly ascribed to the Asian-American women with this name, she sets out to find people who break the mold, including Grace Lee Boggs, a Chinese-American philosopher and activist.

== Production ==
Lee traveled throughout the United States to meet other people with her name. Although she heard from non-Asians, she chose to focus solely on people of Asian descent. Funding was made possible through public television.

== Release ==
The Grace Lee Project opened in New York on December 14, 2005.

== Reception ==
On the review aggregator website Rotten Tomatoes, 95% of 21 critics' reviews are positive, with an average rating of 7.1/10. The website's consensus reads: "The Grace Lee Project is a clever, humorous, and personal exploration of identity, ethnic stereotypes, and the oppressive cultural expectations placed on Asian-American women." Metacritic, which uses a weighted average, assigned the film a score of 63 out of 100, based on 12 critics, indicating "generally favorable" reviews.

Dennis Harvey of Variety wrote that the film's "trivial-sounding hook manages to float a funny but complex meditation on identity, ethnicity and cultural expectations". John Anderson of the Los Angeles Times called it "a journey of realization for anyone who's ever felt lost in the crowd." Stephen Holden of The New York Times described it as a witty autobiography that is "really about cultural assimilation and a stereotype of virtue and subservience that has deep roots on both sides of the Pacific." Noel Murray of The A.V. Club wrote of Lee that "her technique is pretty much everything that's wrong with documentary filmmaking today."
