= Janeane from Des Moines =

- Film poster
- Directed by: Grace Lee
- Written by: Grace Lee; Jane Edith Wilson
- Produced by: Grace Lee; Jane Edith Wilson
- Starring: Jane Edith Wilson
- Cinematography: Jerry A. Henry
- Edited by: Aldo Velasco
- Music by: Ceiri Torjussen
- Production companies: Wilsilu Pictures; Open Pictures
- Release date: September 7, 2012 (TIFF)
- Running time: 77 minutes
- Country: United States
- Language: English

Janeane from Des Moines is a 2012 American political drama film directed by Grace Lee, written by Lee and Jane Edith Wilson, and starring Wilson as a conservative housewife who attends the 2012 Republican Party primary in Iowa. It mixes elements of mockumentary and real-life interviews with Republican politicians conducted in-character without their knowledge.

== Plot ==
Janeane, a conservative housewife from Iowa, is an undecided voter who wishes to find more information about the Republican Party politicians running for U.S. President in 2012. She attends the Republican Party primary in an effort to find a politician who can offer a solution to the problems she faces. Her situation deteriorates quickly: her husband loses his job and comes out as gay, and she is diagnosed with cancer. These and other issues drive her to question her long-held beliefs and attempt to find a politician who can offer more than sound bites.

== Cast ==
- Jane Edith Wilson as Janeane
- Michael Oosterom as Fred
- Melanie Merkovsky as Lissi

=== Interviews ===
- Mitt Romney
- Newt Gingrich
- Rick Santorum
- Michele Bachmann
- Rick Perry
- Anita Perry

== Production ==
Lee and Wilson had previously collaborated on American Zombie. Wilson wanted to make a documentary about the Christian left, but Lee decided to make a film that blends documentary and narrative filmmaking techniques. The politicians and media were unaware that Janeane is a fictional character, and some media outlets reported on her story.

== Release ==
Janeane from Des Moines premiered at the 2012 Toronto International Film Festival. It had a limited release in October 2012.

== Reception ==
Dennis Harvey of Variety wrote, "Grace Lee's film can be billed (or dismissed) as a stunt, but it admirably refuses to go the predictable route of 'punking' the candidates for easy satire or cheap laughs." Frank Scheck of The Hollywood Reporter called it a "toothless satire" that "fails to make any compelling points." Daniel M. Gold of The New York Times wrote that Wilson has a "rare talent for staying in character". Gold identifies the major theme as "the immense gap between a desperate citizen and the politics she had hoped might help her." Claude Peck of the Star Tribune rated it 2.5/4 stars and wrote, "This cinema demi-verité is a fascinating, discomfiting hybrid of real candidates and a fake constituent, but director Grace Lee's own politics and tactics are something of a muddle." Nick McCarthy of Slant Magazine rated it 1.5/4 stars and wrote, "Yet another entry in the canon of pandering pablum that audiences can expect in a presidential election year, Grace Lee's Janeane from Des Moines would be an intriguing depiction of personal and political disillusionment if its conceit wasn't so transparent and lopsided." ION Cinema wrote, "What truly impresses is Wilson's ability to remain in character – she is more convincing than when Michael Moore walked hospital corridors in an actual health care doc Sicko, or what Sacha Baron Cohen and Joaquin Phoenix recently attempted."
