= Honor walk =

Ceremonial event preceding organ donation

An honor walk (or hero walk) is a ceremonial event to commemorate a patient whose organs are donated. The event normally takes place as the patient is transported to an operating room or waiting ambulance prior to organ procurement. It is typically held for patients on life support with no chance of survival, but can also be held for living donors.

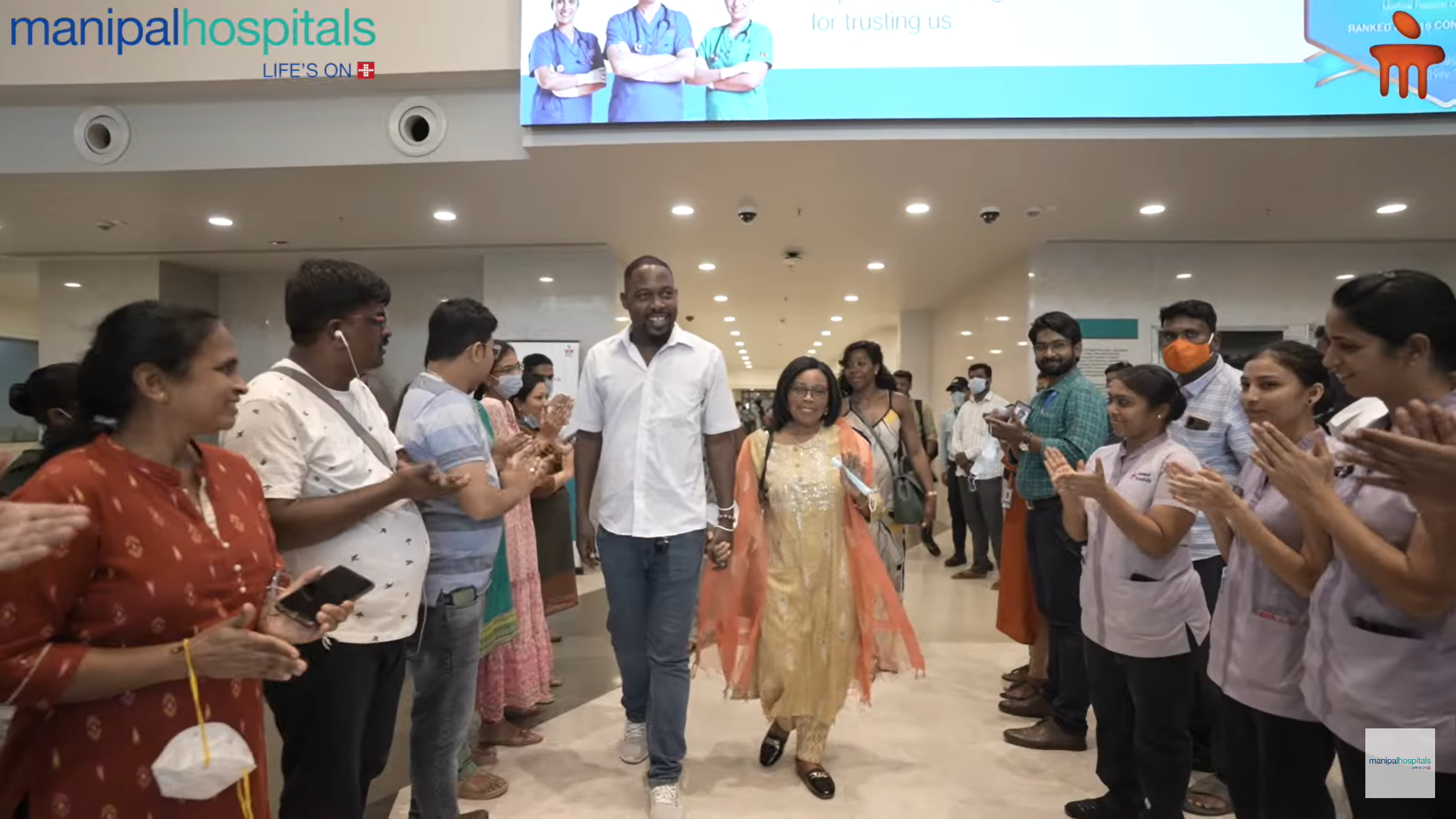
An honor walk held for a living liver donor in Bengaluru, India

== Context ==
As of 2022, over 100,000 people were on the national organ transplant waiting list in the United States, with seventeen people dying per day waiting for a transplant. An individual donor can provide up to eight organs.

The ceremony began in part because nurses working in American intensive-care units wanted to honor their patients who had died and donated their organs.

== Procedure ==
As the patient is transported to the operating room or a waiting ambulance, the hallways are lined with hospital staff and the patient's friends and family. The event is intended to show appreciation and respect for the patient's decision to donate their organs and may include an honor guard in the case of a veteran.

== Media ==
- In February 2020, the Center for Investigative Reporting podcast Reveal discussed the rising trend of honor walks during the process of organ donation in an episode titled The Honor Walk.
- In season 2 episode 14 of The Good Doctor, a walk of honor takes place for a young brain-dead girl whose face is to be transplanted.
- In season 5, episode 3 of The Resident, there is an honor walk for Nic Nevin who died from a traumatic brain injury following a car crash.
- In "2:00 P.M.", the eighth episode of the first season of The Pitt, an honor walk is held for patient Nick Bradley, who died of an overdose due to the ingestion of Xanax laced with fentanyl. Despite his driver's license indicating that he was an organ donor, his parents are initially reluctant to accept what has happened to their son, but later change their mind.
- In The Rookie, season 4, episode 17, “Coding,” the beginning shows a dead organ donor Riley getting an honour walk.

== COVID-19 pandemic ==
During the COVID-19 pandemic, the honor walk was extended to survivors who battled severe cases of COVID-19 after testing positive. As hospitals experienced an overwhelming number of patients, these survivors became symbols of hope and perseverance. When discharged, many of these patients were honored in a similar way as organ donors with a procession through hospital halls—a final walk of gratitude either in a wheelchair or bed prior to leaving the hospital.
