= Wo Ai Ni Mommy =

- Directed by: Stephanie Wang-Breal
- Theme music composer: Paul Goldman
- Country of origin: United States
- Original languages: English, Cantonese and Mandarin dialogue

Production
- Producers: Judith Helfand, Jean Tsien
- Cinematography: Donny Tam, Wang-Breal
- Editor: Gigi Wong
- Running time: 77 minutes

Original release
- Network: P.O.V.
- Release: August 31, 2010

Wo Ai Ni Mommy (I Love You Mommy) is a 2010 American television documentary film directed by Stephanie Wang-Breal, and distributed by P.O.V.. The documentary follows the story of a then 8-year-old Chinese girl, Fang Sui Yong, who was adopted by a Jewish Long Island family. The film had its world premiere at the San Francisco International Asian American Film Festival in 2010.

The girl is given the new name of Faith by her adoptive mother, Donna Sadowsky, and the film documents her life just before her adoption in China, and follows her journey to America for a period of 18 months. Faith lived with her new adopted father, Jeff, as well as the Sadowsky's two biological sons and another Chinese adoptee.

"Wo Ai Ni Mommy" inspired Stephanie Wang-Breal's second feature documentary, "Tough Love," a story about two families affected by the United States child welfare system. "Tough Love" was shown in festivals worldwide.

== Awards ==
Wo Ai Ni Mommy won: The Best Documentary Feature at the San Francisco International Asian American Film Festival, and the 'Sterling Award for Best U.S. Feature' at the Silverdocs. The film was nominated for an Emmy for Outstanding Informational Programming-Long Form, which was awarded on September 26, 2011.
