= 4:00 P.M. (The Pitt season 1) =

- The Pitt episode
- Episode no.: Season 1 Episode 10
- Directed by: Damian Marcano
- Written by: Simran Baidwan
- Cinematography by: Johanna Coelho
- Editing by: Mark Strand
- Production code: T76.10110
- Original air date: March 6, 2025
- Running time: 50 minutes

Guest appearances
- Amielynn Abellera as Perlah; Jalen Thomas Brooks as Mateo Diaz; Brandon Mendez Homer as Donnie; Kristin Villanueva as Princess; Mac Brandt as Greg Young; Bailey Gavulic as Amy Miller; Joanna Going as Theresa Saunders; Rob Heaps as Chad Ashcroft; Michael Hyatt as Gloria Underwood; Mac Jarman as Everett Young; Alexandra Metz as Dr. Yolanda Garcia; Kinner Shah as Dr. Mehta; Tracy Vilar as Lupe Perez

Episode chronology
← Previous "3:00 P.M."	Next → "5:00 P.M."

"4:00 P.M." is the tenth episode of the American medical drama television series The Pitt. The episode was written by executive producer Simran Baidwan, and directed by co-executive producer Damian Marcano. It was released on Max on March 6, 2025.

The series is set in Pittsburgh, following the staff of the Pittsburgh Trauma Medical Hospital ER (nicknamed "The Pitt") during a 15-hour emergency department shift. The series mainly follows Dr. Michael "Robby" Robinavitch, a senior attending still reeling from some traumas. In the episode, the conflicts between Langdon and Santos escalate, while McKay is surprised to see her ex-partner is checking in to the hospital.

The episode received mostly positive reviews, with critics praising the performances and cliffhanger ending.

== Plot ==
Robby is surprised to find police officers questioning Theresa, about David's hit list. Dana re-enters the hospital with a bleeding and broken nose after being punched by an angry patient. She refuses to leave her shift, but is treated and takes a small break. The rest of the nurses remark how common this is and mention a strike, forcing Gloria to speak up on the subject.

Langdon and Whitaker tend to a man, Teddy, with a whole-body burn. When Teddy's wife arrives, Robby suggests they say what they need to each other, as Teddy will not be able to speak after being intubated. Whitaker reassures her. They are able to successfully operate on Teddy, but Langdon hints he is unlikely to survive.

Javadi and McKay treat a teenager who was hit in the eye by a baseball. Javadi snaps at the teen's father, who seems more concerned about his son's baseball career.

McKay is shocked when her son Harrison arrives because her ex-partner Chad Ashcroft had a skateboarding accident. Robby chastises McKay for informing the police about David's possible intentions, but she remains convinced she did the right thing.

Santos goes to Robby about her suspicions that Langdon is stealing meds from patients. Robby confronts Langdon and forces him to open his locker, which contains stolen medication. Langdon tries to defend his actions, saying he is treating his own drug withdrawal. Robby, visibly incensed and betrayed, forces him to leave immediately.

== Production ==
=== Development ===
The episode was written by executive producer Simran Baidwan, and directed by co-executive producer Damian Marcano. This marked Baidwan's second writing credit, and Marcano's third directing credit.

=== Writing ===
The episode reveals that Langdon has been stealing doses from the hospital. Patrick Ball said that this is "the closest thing you are going to get to a breakup scene on The Pitt", explaining that he understands why Robby's reaction was justified. He further added, "He says you've got to take him at his word. He says, I'm never high. I'm not high treating my own withdrawal symptoms so that I can do the job that I need to do. But to what extent is that self-maintenance? How much is he taking to fend off withdrawal symptoms? I think that question is still out there and it's something that I think is better to be wondered about than answered."

On Robby sending Langdon home after discovering this, Noah Wyle explained, "it's a serious liability issue, first and foremost, if you have a doctor who could be compromised in the kind of care that they're giving. Additionally, there's the personal betrayal of having your mentee lie to your face and kind of gaslight you along. Then there's the reverse engineering of recognizing clues that you probably should have picked up on but didn't because of your bias, or your inability or unwillingness to look at things at face value, even though you are an expert in looking at signs, behaviors, ticks... so I think it's a combination of anger at [Langdon] and anger at himself."

== Critical reception ==
"4:00 P.M." received mostly positive reviews from critics. Laura Bogart of The A.V. Club gave the episode a "B" grade and wrote, "The episode spends so much time focusing on the importance of the ER team working as a cohesive group, however those bonds may form, that its great singular moment of that cohesion fracturing hits even harder."

Alan Sepinwall wrote, "While this was another excellent overall on what for the moment is the Show of the Year for me, it did illustrate a couple of areas where The Pitt occasionally wobbles. The first of these is with the structure of having all of this happen within one incredibly eventful shift. Several subplots, and the evolving nature of the relationships between some of the characters — particularly between the newbies and the vets — feel like they would make more sense playing out over the weeks or months covered by a traditional hospital drama season."

Maggie Fremont of Vulture gave the episode a 4 star rating out of 5 and wrote, "Noah Wyle is so good here, a perfect, potent mix of quiet anger, betrayal, and absolute heartbreak. Langdon was more than just Robby's trusted senior resident, he was his friend, and he has made a fool out of him." Nick Bythrow of Screen Rant wrote, "Episode 10 ends on a tense note, but one that echoes another concerning revelation Robby spoke about earlier. Twice in the episode, Robby mentions his shift almost being over, even emphasizing how there's only three hours left when the episode begins. However, with five episodes remaining and Noah Wyle hinting The Pitt's final episodes will feel different from everything that's come before, something big is bound to extend his shift. This intense episode might be the last shred of normalcy for Robby before everything changes."

Johnny Loftus of Decider wrote, "The second half of The Pitt's first season is just the series injecting viewers with 500 cc's of pharmaceutical-grade chaos on the regular." Gabriela Burgos Soler of Telltale TV wrote, "Hour ten has arrived on The Pitt Season 1 Episode 10, '4:00pm,' and the staff members are excited to be clocking out soon and making plans for the weekend. However, it's going to be an eventful two hours before freedom from the pitt."

== Accolades ==
Award	Category	Recipient(s)	Result	Ref.
Primetime Creative Arts Emmy Awards	Outstanding Prosthetic Makeup	Myriam Arougheti, Thom Floutz, Chris Burgoyne, and Martina Sykes	Nominated	
