= 5:00 P.M. (The Pitt season 1) =

- The Pitt episode
- Episode no.: Season 1 Episode 11
- Directed by: Quyen Tran
- Written by: Elyssa Gershman
- Cinematography by: Johanna Coelho
- Editing by: Joey Reinisch
- Production code: T76.10111
- Original air date: March 13, 2025
- Running time: 49 minutes

Guest appearances
- Amielynn Abellera as Perlah; Jalen Thomas Brooks as Mateo Diaz; Brandon Mendez Homer as Donnie; Kristin Villanueva as Princess; Carmine Giovinazzo as Ivan Pugliesi; Joanna Going as Theresa Saunders; Rob Heaps as Chad Ashcroft; Jonetta Kaiser as Chloe; Mason McCulley as Justin Swanson; Alexandra Metz as Dr. Yolanda Garcia; Enuka Okuma as Natalie Malone; Jay Walker as Sean Ramsdell

Episode chronology
← Previous "4:00 P.M."	Next → "6:00 P.M."

"5:00 P.M." is the eleventh episode of the American medical drama television series The Pitt. The episode was written by Elyssa Gershman, and directed by Quyen Tran. It was released on Max on March 13, 2025.

The series is set in Pittsburgh, following the staff of the Pittsburgh Trauma Medical Hospital ER (nicknamed "The Pitt") during a 15-hour emergency department shift. The series mainly follows Dr. Michael "Robby" Robinavitch, a senior attending still reeling from some traumas. In the episode, Robby and Collins assist in a birth delivery, while McKay faces problems with her ex-partner.

The episode received critical acclaim, with critics praising the birth storyline, performances and cliffhanger.

== Plot ==
Robby tells Dana that he sent Langdon home, but does not clarify the reason. As she wants to stay until her shift ends, he asks her to get all information on Langdon's patients and med doses. After almost dropping the doses in the restroom, Robby is approached by Theresa, who is concerned that David posted some menacing words on Instagram, but the police is unable to find him.

Collins finally tells Robby about her miscarriage, but states she does not want to go home. She then tends to Natalie, a surrogate mother, who is about to deliver her baby. Despite some complications, Collins and Robby successfully deliver the baby, while also providing the baby with oxygen. Natalie begins bleeding heavily, although Collins is able to save her and stop the bleeding. Nevertheless, the experience overwhelms Collins.

McKay argues with Chad over his accident, when his girlfriend Chloe arrives. This leads to a verbal fight between them over Harrison's custody, as Chad wants Chloe to care for him while he stays in the hospital. McKay and Javadi treat a former drug addict with hepatitis B experiencing an esophageal bleeding by using a Sengstaken–Blakemore tube. Whitaker and Mohan treat a man asking for morphine, but Mohan notes that the man is on opioid withdrawal, so they give him buprenorphine without his knowledge. When they inform him, he gets very upset, prompting Mohan to scold him for not being happy that he gets to attend his daughter's wedding, revealing her father died.

Langdon keeps calling Robby, but he ignores him; Robby later talks with Jake, who thanks him for the Pitt Fest tickets. Running into Collins outside, she opens up about her miscarriage; seeing her struggle, Robby tells her to go home and turn off her phone to take her mind off everything. Collins reveals she had an abortion years ago as she was unready to be a mother; Robby realizes the child was his, and urges Collins to forgive herself. When Theresa expresses more concerns over David, she finally decides to sign David under a psychiatric hold. He then meets with Dana outside, who feels stressed over the day's events, and is considering quitting. Suddenly, their phone alerts them with a new triage code: there is an active shooter at Pitt Fest.

== Production ==
=== Development ===
The episode was written by Elyssa Gershman, and directed by Quyen Tran. This marked Gershman's first writing credit, and Tran's second directing credit.

=== Writing ===
Noah Wyle explained that the conversation between Robby and Collins in the ambulance was done to show that the characters had some history together, which was not delved in before. He explains, "then they find themselves sitting in the back of an ambulance, and she's disclosed to him that she's been trying to get pregnant, that she's just had a miscarriage, and that this isn't her first pregnancy. And as we filmed it, it was extremely emotional." He added, "certain moments get earned. You need to indulge in the professional for a while, and then you need to reveal the toll that's taking on the personal. You're kind of going micro, macro — inside our characters, and outside our characters. By the time you get to Episode 11, you've invested quite a bit in our characters, and they've carried quite a lot of their day up until that moment, so it earns the breath."

=== Filming ===
The episode depicts a graphic birth scene. Showrunner R. Scott Gemmill said the crew wanted to depict a birth as realistically as possible, "It's really being cognizant of the reality of the medicine, trying to stick to it, trying to present it as authentically as possible. That's why we're doing it this way: not to cheat it."

Autonomous FX was in charge of the prosthetic effects in the episode. They used a rig previously used on the series SMILF and Dead Ringers, which consists of a gurney with a silicone prosthetic of a belly, legs, and a vaginal canal anchored on top. Two puppeteers were used for the scene; one would add blood and other fluids at appropriate points during the birth, while the other would squeeze the silicone baby out of the vaginal canal. Enuka Okuma, who played the surrogate mother giving birth, worked with an intimacy coordinator, even though the body on the gurney was a silicone model. She said, "Everyone understood it wasn't me, but it's still a vulnerable position to be there, with people kind of gawking. I really, truly appreciated it. Even though we all know it's make-believe! It’s just, 'Let’s make this actress comfortable.'"

== Critical reception ==
"5:00 P.M." received critical acclaim. Laura Bogart of The A.V. Club gave the episode an "A" grade and wrote, "If The Pitt has earned high praise from the medical community for its honesty in portraying the ins and outs and ups and downs of an ER, it also merits acclaim for the way it depicts infertility. Those of us who know we'll never be able to carry a baby of our own can see ourselves in the wicked set of coincidences that have befallen Dr. Collins, who persuaded the mother of a teenager to let her have an abortion and now sticks her hands inside a woman whose body did what hers could not to usher a child into the world."

Alan Sepinwall wrote, "the childbirth story in this one was pretty harrowing, and among the more graphic I've seen, and required a lot of technical wizardry to pull off. The benefits of streaming shows not having to deal with censors."

Maggie Fremont of Vulture gave the episode a perfect 5 star rating out of 5 and wrote, "While The Pitt has already had multiple standout episodes in its first season, what I found so winning about “5:00 P.M” is that it really takes the time to show us both sides of what it can do: the intensity and chaos feels more amped up than usual (if you can believe it), as Robby yet again bounces between two emergent cases, and then we also get two quiet character-building scenes that I have gone back and watched multiple times because I love them so."

Nick Bythrow of Screen Rant wrote, "Since The Pitt has four episodes left, the length of time remaining signals devastating results from the festival, with Robby potentially suffering a direct loss. While episode 11 already raised the stakes, its ending signals they're about to get even more dangerous." Johnny Loftus of Decider wrote, "There is nothing this wise, always prepared charge nurse has not seen. But the look in her eyes gets serious when she tells Robby the punch might have hastened her last hurrah. Would Dana really leave?"
