= Emily Rooney =

American journalist

- Born: 1949 or 1950 (age 76–77)
- Education: American University (1972)
- Occupations: Journalist, TV talk show and radio host, news producer
- Spouse: Kirby Perkins (d.1997)
- Children: 1
- Relatives: Andy Rooney
- Website: www.wgbh.org/programs/The-Emily-Rooney-Show-854

Emily Rooney (born 1949 or 1950) is an American journalist, television talk show and radio host, and former news producer. She hosted the weekly program Beat the Press on WGBH-TV until its cancellation on August 13, 2021, following a public controversy about remarks she made on air.

== Early life and education ==
Emily Rooney was born in 1949 or 1950), the daughter of noted CBS 60 Minutes correspondent and humorist Andy Rooney. She grew up in Rowayton, Connecticut.

She graduated from the American University in Washington, D.C. in 1972.

== Career ==
In the mid-to-late 1970s, Rooney worked at the CBS affiliate in Hartford, Connecticut, WFSB as an assignment editor among other positions at the station. From 1979 to 1993, she worked at WCVB-TV in Boston as assistant news director, and then a news director for three years. In May of 1993, she was hired to serve as executive producer of World News Tonight (as hosted by Peter Jennings, who had hand-picked her), ABC's nightly news program. Her tenure would last just seven months before she was fired as producer. Following her tenure with ABC and WCVB, Rooney was director of political coverage and special events at the Fox Network in New York, from 1994 to 1997.

From 1997, she was the creator, executive editor, and moderator of Greater Boston, which was later rebroadcast on the Boston-based WGBH radio station, where she also hosted the Emily Rooney Show. As of 2010, Rooney moderated a weekly media analysis TV show, Beat the Press.

On May 29, 2014, WGBH announced Rooney would be stepping down from her host position on the Greater Boston TV show to become a special correspondent for the program. After 18 years as host, her final Greater Boston show aired on December 18 of that year. She continued to host Beat the Press until its cancellation on August 13, 2021.

== Recognition and honors ==
Rooney has been awarded the National Press Club's Arthur Rowse Award for Press Criticism, a series of New England Emmy Awards, and Associated Press recognition for Best News/Talk Show. Her WGBH news program, Greater Boston, has received two Regional Edward R. Murrow broadcast journalism awards and five New England Emmy Awards. She also received a New England Emmy in the category of Outstanding Achievement in Commentary/Editorial.

She holds honorary doctoral degrees from the University of Massachusetts Boston and Westfield State College.

== Controversy ==
On March 29, 2021, a public letter organized by Beyond Inclusion, a BIPOC-led collective of non-fiction filmmakers, executives, and other artistic figures was signed by over 700 filmmakers and sent to PBS president Paula Kerger. The letter was in response to then-recent conversations sparked by Grace Lee's essay for the Ford Foundation's Creative Futures series, and Kerger's public response to it. The letter asked how much funding and airtime filmmaker Ken Burns had received over the years in comparison to BIPOC filmmakers, and demanded access to specific data about equity across the board. On April 2, 2021, during a Beat the Press episode discussing the PBS letter, the six-hour documentary Hemingway by Ken Burns, and the five-hour documentary Asian Americans from Renee Tajima-Peña, Rooney remarked, "I didn't see Asian Americans but there's a possibility it wasn't as good as some of Ken Burns' films." At the end of the show, she stated, "regardless of what this group says, it's resentment that a white guy [Burns] is getting all this time".

On April 14, a letter was sent to WGBH from a New England group of filmmakers that grew out of the Documentary Producers Alliance-Northeast in solidarity with Beyond Inclusion, also condemning Rooney’s comments. In reply, WGBH general manager Pam Johnston issued a statement: "Emily Rooney's comments on the April 2 edition of Beat the Press did not meet WGBH's standards for opinion journalism, or our commitment to being an anti-racist organization that respects all people." In a follow-up letter dated April 16, the regional group now referred to as Filmmakers in Solidarity pointed out the urgent need to address the lack of diverse voices in public media locally, as well as nationally. On April 16, she issued a pre-recorded apology at the start of Beat the Press, saying that her remarks were "uninformed, dismissive, and disrespectful" and while her "intention was to offer further balance to the discussion" she acknowledged "my comments did not accomplish that and instead I crossed a line."

Asian Americans, from series producer Renee Tajima-Peña, won a Peabody Award in June 2021.

== Personal life ==
Rooney has an identical twin sister, Martha, who is as of 2024 chief of the Public Services Division at the United States National Library of Medicine in Bethesda, Maryland. Her brother Brian Rooney was a correspondent for ABC News for 23 years. Another sister, Ellen Rooney, was a film and video editor at ABC News before becoming a professional photographer in London, England.

Rooney has one daughter. Her husband, WCVB-TV reporter Kirby Perkins, died suddenly of heart failure in July, 1997.
