= Suzy Nakamura =

American actress

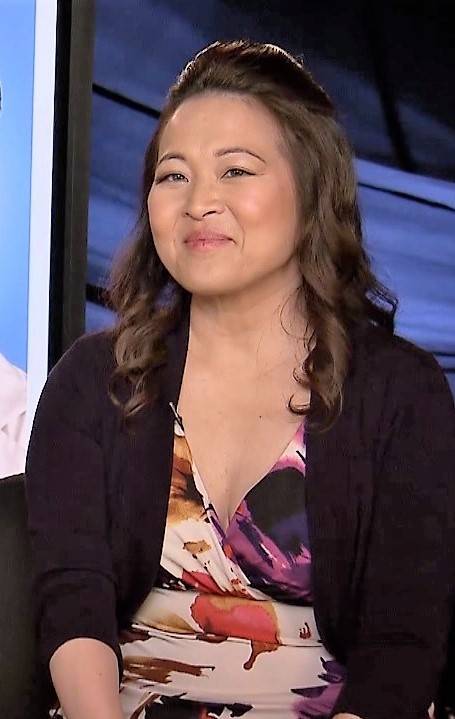
- Nakamura interviewed on Sidewalks in 2017
- Born: December 2, 1968 (age 57); Chicago, Illinois, U.S.
- Occupation: Actress
- Years active: 1994–present
- Spouse: Harry Hannigan (divorced)

Suzy Nakamura (born December 2, 1968) is an American actress and improv comedian. She is known for her many guest appearances on sitcoms such as According to Jim, Half and Half, 8 Simple Rules, Curb Your Enthusiasm and How I Met Your Mother and her recurring role in the early seasons of the drama The West Wing as assistant to the Sam Seaborn character, as well as Dr. Miura in the ABC sitcom Modern Family and Karen in the Netflix series Dead to Me. She had leading roles in the television shows Dr. Ken and Avenue 5.

== Early life ==
Nakamura was born and raised in Chicago, Illinois, to parents of Japanese descent. Her father was an English teacher for the Chicago Public Schools. Her parents died within a year of each other when she was in her twenties. She has one older brother. Nakamura attended Lane Technical College Prep High School. After graduation in 1985, she joined the Asian-American theater company, MinaSama-No.

Nakamura studied theater at Columbia College Chicago from 1987 to 1989. She would attend every other semester as she had to finance her education herself. In 1991, Nakamura was the first Asian American woman to join The Second City improvisational comedy troupe. She remained a part of the troupe for five years.

Nakamura worked at Crate & Barrel prior to working as an actor.

== Career ==
Nakamura has acted in various films, television shows, commercials, web-series, and stage plays throughout her career, in addition to performing improv comedy. She cofounded The Second City Detroit in 1993.

Her first film role was as a troubled teen in Rea Tajiri's Chicago-based film, Strawberry Fields (1997). It was an official selection at the 54th Venice International Film Festival.

On May 7, 2015, ABC picked up Ken Jeong's Dr. Ken starring Jeong as a fictional version of himself and Nakamura as his wife for its 2015–16 Fall Season. She played a recurring role as investigative reporter Irene Abe on FX's crime drama television series Snowfall. In August 2018, it was announced that Nakamura had joined HBO's television comedy Avenue 5 as Iris Kimura, the assistant to billionaire Herman Judd (played by Josh Gad). The series premiered on January 19, 2020.

== Honors and awards ==
She was an honoree at the East West Players' 52nd Visionary Award in 2018.

== Personal life ==
Nakamura was married to Harry Hannigan. They separated in 2018 and have since divorced.

== Filmography ==
=== Film ===
Year	Title	Role	Notes
1997	Strawberry Fields	Irene Kawai	
1998	Deep Impact	Jenny's Assistant	
1999	Treasure Island	Yo-Ji	
1999	8mm	Computer Wizard	
2000	Timecode	Connie Ling	
2002	Stark Raving Mad	Betty Shin	Credited as Suzi Nakamura
2002	Barrier Device	Serena	
2003	Malibu's Most Wanted	Soon-Yee Baxter Hernandez	
2004	Dodgeball: A True Underdog Story	Gordon's Wife	
2005	Must Love Dogs	Mai	
2005	The 40-Year-Old Virgin	Speed Dater (uncredited)	
2006	For Your Consideration	First AC	
2007	American Zombie	Judy	
2007	Evan Almighty	Staffer	
2008	Spy School	Ms. Bleckner	
2011	The Little Engine That Could	Teacher (voice)	Direct-to-video
2014	Horrible Bosses 2	Kim	
2023	Knox Goes Away	Emily Ikari	
2025	Fireflies in the Dusk	Dr. Abbott	Short film
2026	Miss You, Love You	Kathy	

=== Television ===
Year	Title	Role	Notes
1996	Common Law	Suzy Yamamoto	2 episodes
1997	The Player	Robbie Lawless	Unsold pilot
1998	The Closer	Beverly Andolini	10 episodes
1999–2000	The West Wing	Cathy	9 episodes
2000	Daddio	Holly Martin	14 episodes
2002	Imagine That	Rina Oh	6 episodes
2002	I Got You		Unsold pilot
2002	Curb Your Enthusiasm	Assistant manager	5 episodes
2002–2006	Half & Half	Tina	10 episodes
2003	Abby	Carol	Episode: "Ted & Carol & Will & Abby"
2003	All of Us	Teacher #1	
2004	Good Morning, Miami	Carol	
2004	The King of Queens	Molly	Episode: "Name Dropper"
2004–2005	8 Simple Rules	Mrs. Krupp	
2005	Confessions of a Dog		Unsold pilot
2005	According to Jim	Yoki Hirasaki	Episode: "The Competition"
2006	Worst Week of My Life	Megan	Unsold pilot
2006–2007	The Minor Accomplishments of Jackie Woodman	Carol Rinaldi	4 episodes
2006–2007	Help Me Help You	Inger	12 episodes
2007	Insatiable		Unsold pilot
2008	Grey's Anatomy	Jenn Smith	Episode: "Here Comes the Flood"
2008	My Name is Earl	Phyllis Woohoo	Episode: "Joy in a Bubble"
2008	True Jackson, VP	Cricket	Episode: "Pilot"
2008	The Mentalist	Dr. Fox	Episode: "His Right Red Hand"
2009	It's Always Sunny in Philadelphia	Tabitha	Episode: "The Gang Gives Frank an Intervention"
2009–2010	10 Things I Hate About You	Principal Holland	6 episodes
2009–2010	Modern Family	Dr. Miura	Episodes: "Run for Your Wife", "Fears"
2009	Private Practice	Margaret Delhom	Episode: "Sins of the Father"
2010–2011	Men of a Certain Age	Elissa	3 episodes
2010	Bones	Carrie Turner	Episode: "The Death of the Queen Bee"
2010	Castle	Jennifer Wong	Episode: "Food to Die For"
2011	How I Met Your Mother	Dr. Kirby	Episode: "A Change of Heart"
2012–2013	Go On	Yolanda	22 episodes
2013	Melissa & Joey	Elyse	Episode: "Something Happened"
2014	Liv and Maddie	Tammy	Episode: "Switch-a-Rooney"
2014	Bad Teacher	Mrs. Hu	Episode: "A Little Respect"
2014–2018	The Goldbergs	Mrs. Kim	4 episodes
2015	Togetherness	Xan	Episode: "Kick the Can"
2015	Bob's Burgers	Yuki	Episode: "Hawk & Chick"
2015–2019	Veep	Anna	Episodes: "Mommy Meyer" "Discovery Weekend" & "Veep"
2015	Whole Day Down	Saint Anne	6 episodes
2015–2017	Dr. Ken	Allison Park	Main role (44 episodes)
2017	How to Beat Your Sister-in-Law (at everything)	Suzy	Episode: "Puppy Love" "Flyered Up the Ass"
2017	9JKL	Casting Director	Episode: "TV MD"
2018	Black-ish	Dr. Ima	Episode: "Dream Home" "Fifty-Three Percent"
2018	Station 19	Susan	Episode: "Every Second Counts"
2018	Elementary	Dr. Bridget Tanaka	Episode: "Through the Fog"
2018	All About the Washingtons	Mrs. Chadwick	Episode: "Papa Said Log You Out"
2019–2022	Dead to Me	Karen	Recurring role
2019	Harley Quinn	Realtor (voice)	Episode: "Being Harley Quinn"
2019–2023	Tacoma FD	Linda Price	Recurring role
2020–2022	Avenue 5	Iris Kimura	Main cast
2020–2022	Close Enough	Ms. Hashima	3 episodes
2020	The Neighborhood	Dr. Chen	Episode: "Welcome to Couples Therapy"
2021	Snowfall	Irene Abe	Recurring role (season 4)
2021	Ten Year Old Tom	Amanda (voice)	Episode: "Tom Urinates on Boston/First Responder"
2021–2022	Inside Job	Tamiko Ridley (voice)	Recurring role
2024	Exploding Kittens	Abbie (voice)	Main cast

=== Video games ===
Year	Title	Role	Notes
2022	Ghostwire: Tokyo	Woman B, Woman D	

== Theater ==
- An Infinite Ache
- The Showatorium
- Coptors
- Shogun's Heroes
- Coed Prison Sluts – The Musical
- The Armando Diaz Experience
- The Deconstruction Derby
- The Zodiac Thrillers
- The Dickie Bell Twist Dance Party
- Pen to Paper
- The Second City Alumni Jam
- The Powerhouse Variety Show
- The Redwood Curtain
- Power to the People Mover
- National Touring Company (The Second City – Chicago)
- POTUS: Or, Behind Every Great Dumbass Are Seven Women Trying to Keep Him Alive (Shubert Theatre – Broadway) as Jean
