= American Zombie =

- Directed by: Grace Lee
- Written by: Rebecca Sonnenshine; Grace Lee
- Produced by: In-Ah Lee
- Starring: Austin Basis; Suzy Nakamura; John Solomon; Al Vicente; Jane Edith Wilson; John Solomon
- Cinematography: Matthias Grunsky
- Edited by: Tamara M. Maloney
- Music by: Woody Pak
- Production company: Leelee Films
- Distributed by: Cinema Libre Studio; iHQ
- Release date: January 18, 2007 (Slamdance Film Festival)
- Running time: 96 minutes
- Country: United States
- Language: English
- Box office: $3,126

American Zombie is a 2007 American independent mockumentary comedy horror film directed by Grace Lee, written by Rebecca Sonnenshine and Lee, and starring Lee and John Solomon as documentary filmmakers who investigate a fictional subculture of real-life zombies living in Los Angeles.

== Plot ==
John Solomon, a documentary filmmaker, recruits Grace Lee to investigate the zombie subculture of Los Angeles. Solomon is convinced that the zombies are dangerous and wishes to expose them, but Lee takes a more sympathetic view. Zombies are divided into three different categories: the feral, Romero-style zombies that exhibit no sentience; low-functioning zombies that can work simple menial jobs, such as sweatshops; and high-functioning zombies that do not retain their memories or personality but can pass as human. At first open and welcoming, the zombies become evasive and warn the documentary crew away from a private ceremony at an upcoming zombie festival. There, the crew discovers that the rumors of cannibalism are not simply an ignorant cultural stereotype.

== Cast ==
- Grace Lee as a fictional version of herself
- John Solomon as a fictional version of himself
- Austin Basis as Ivan
- Suzy Nakamura as Judy
- Al Vicente as Joel
- Jane Edith Wilson as Lisa
- Andrew Amondson as himself
- Amy D. Higgins as Dr. Gloria Reynolds
- Vanessa Peters as Monique

== Production ==
The film was inspired by director Grace Lee's previous documentary work and the violent dreams that one of Lee's friends had been having. Lee wanted to make a satire about documentary filmmaking, identity politics, and life in Los Angeles.

== Release ==
American Zombie premiered at Slamdance Film Festival on January 18, 2007. It also screened at SXSW and Sitges Film Festival. On March 28, 2008, it got a limited theatrical release. To publicize the release, Lee and members of the cast recreated artistic elements of the show, including a zombie art showing and zines. It was released on DVD on July 8, 2008. American Zombie is the first English-language film distributed by iHQ.

== Reception ==
Rotten Tomatoes, a review aggregator, reports that 72% of 18 surveyed critics gave the film a positive review; the average rating was 6.5/10. Bloody Disgusting rated the film 2.5/5 stars and said that the climax invalidates the biting satire that comes before it. Dennis Harvey of Variety called the film mildly amusing and tepid compared to much better zombie spoofs, which he said are played out. Steve Barton of Dread Central rated the film 3.5/5 stars and said the film "will keep you laughing and also send the shivers. It's one of the most unique living dead experiences you're likely to have for some time to come." However, Barton criticized the ending as "a very flaccid exclamation point on an otherwise ambitious experience." Tom Becker of DVD Verdict wrote that it is "a funny and original faux documentary that works as a social satire as well as a send up of the horror subgenre made famous by George Romero." Heather Seebach of Shock Till You Drop wrote that it "provides a clever idea with elements of social commentary and self-parody." J. R. Jones of the Chicago Reader said that while almost nothing in the film is original, Lee "smoothly steers the narrative from farce to suspense." In a mixed review, Stephen Farber of The Hollywood Reporter said that "the satire is highly uneven, and the whole enterprise is a bit too drawn out to retain its irreverent momentum." Academic Peter Dendle called the film a "discerning, carefully thought out contribution to the genre" that "is never reducible to a preachy, thinly veiled metaphor". Author Eric Hamako wrote that the film "portrays conservative rhetoric that the Other does not deserve civil rights and will only use those rights to further their attempts to destroy society."
