= 3:00 P.M. (The Pitt season 1) =

- The Pitt episode
- Episode no.: Season 1 Episode 9
- Directed by: Quyen Tran
- Written by: Noah Wyle
- Cinematography by: Johanna Coelho
- Editing by: Lauren Pendergrass
- Production code: T76.10109
- Original air date: February 27, 2025
- Running time: 45 minutes

Guest appearances
- Amielynn Abellera as Perlah; Jalen Thomas Brooks as Mateo Diaz; Brandon Mendez Homer as Donnie; Kristin Villanueva as Princess; Shani Atias as Laura Fisher; Sasha Bhasin as Nandi; Craig Cackowski as Walter Purnell; Amanda Fuller as Madison Humphrey; Joanna Going as Theresa Saunders; Courtney Grosbeck as Piper Fisher; Mandy Levin as Wendy Atwater; Krystel V. McNeil as Kiara Alfaro; Alexandra Metz as Dr. Yolanda Garcia; Drew Powell as Doug Driscoll; Ashley Romans as Joyce St. Claire; Tracy Vilar as Lupe Perez

Episode chronology
| ← Previous "2:00 P.M." | Next → "4:00 P.M." |

"3:00 P.M." is the ninth episode of the American medical drama television series The Pitt. The episode was written by main star Noah Wyle, and directed by Quyen Tran. It was released on HBO Max on February 27, 2025.

The series is set in Pittsburgh, following the staff of the Pittsburgh Trauma Medical Hospital ER (nicknamed "The Pitt") during a 15-hour emergency department shift. The series mainly follows Dr. Michael "Robby" Robinavitch, a senior attending still reeling from some traumas. In the episode, tensions between Langdon and Santos escalate, while Collins confides her situation in Dana.

The episode received mostly positive reviews from critics, who expressed surprise with the episode's ending.

== Plot ==
Privately, Collins confides in Dana about her miscarriage. Dana consoles her, and refuses to disclose this information to Robby, right after he delivers an awkward statement to staff over the drowning death of 6-year-old Amber. (Note: As seen in "2:00 P.M.".) Two women physically fight in the waiting room, forcing Dana to intervene and scold them.

Santos and Mohan treat a patient seizing from an MDMA overdose while at Pitt Fest; Santos deduces hyponatremia from insufficient electrolyte intake during the festival and administers saline prior to the patient's labs coming back, saving her. Langdon berates her in front of everyone for her arrogance and repeated breakage of protocol. Robby takes Langdon aside to admonish him for bad leadership. Langdon checks in on Mel, who is still shaken by Amber's death, and assures her that her sensitivity is an asset to their work. He then enlists her to remove hundreds of gravel pieces from a patient's road rash, an exercise that the neurodivergent Mel finds soothing.

Two victims of a car crash are admitted, including Paula, a patient of McKay's before the shift started. Collins, McKay, and Robby discover that Paula had blacked out while driving due to sepsis caused by endometritis. Doug Driscoll, a man in the waiting room with minor chest pain, becomes angry at Dana and decides to leave, until Langdon points out that he would be leaving against medical advice (AMA).

After getting new scrubs, Whitaker receives an apology from Krakozhia, who had urinated on him during a psychotic episode. Whitaker decides to join the Pitt's "street team" to personally administer Krakozhia's medication and help other unhoused patients. He manages to catch and kill a rat, earning the praise of the staff. Dana takes a smoke break outside and is approached by Doug. He punches her in the face and drops his AMA form on her, leaving the hospital.

== Production ==
=== Development ===
The episode was written by main star Noah Wyle, and directed by Quyen Tran. This marked Wyle's second writing credit, and Tran's first directing credit.

Wyle previously wrote the fourth episode, in order to get it ready before filming. When the script was well received, Wyle said "Hey, I think I would like to do another one", which the writers allowed. He picked up the ninth episode, as it was the next one yet to be written.

=== Writing ===
Wyle described the episode as "the beach that everybody washes up on after the shipwreck."

In the episode's final scene, Dana is punched by Doug after waiting so many hours in the waiting room. Wyle explained, "It's something that happens with all too great a frequency in real life, and here it's to a character that we've become invested in. So, it had a lot of great built-in architecture to it." Katherine LaNasa said that a nurse she knew confirmed that "this is very common for the nurses to get hit, punched, kicked bit, you name it." She explained, "I was really glad to be able to show the human condition of a working woman that's hit in her workplace and the dilemma that it creates for Dana." Regarding how Dana will be affected in the future, LaNasa added, "I think we see Dana go through an existential crisis of sorts, and we see her grapple with how to process this violence. I don't think she wants to face what happened to her."

== Critical reception ==
"3:00 P.M." received mostly positive reviews from critics. Laura Bogart of The A.V. Club gave the episode a "B" grade and wrote, "This ninth hour of The Pitt opens in the aftermath of the previous episode's most devastating case — arguably the most devastating one on the series to date — as a worker clears the remnants of the efforts to resurrect poor Amber. It looks like the room has been hit by a bomb, filled with the cold, impersonal debris of medical equipment — and one child's bow. The reverberations of that blast haunt everyone on the ER team. And this is an episode about ratcheting tensions finally and fully combusting."

Alan Sepinwall wrote, "while it was obvious from at least the second episode that Doug, the angry patient in chairs, was eventually going to explode and do something awful, but the emotional impact of seeing him punch Dana — the single kindest and most empathetic character on the show, who earlier in this episode does such a good job of defusing the fight over masks — is greater because we've gotten to watch his tension build and build in close to real time."

Maggie Fremont of Vulture gave the episode a 4-star rating out of 5 and wrote, "Although I feel like I'm suffering from cognitive dissonance using a word like 'glad' in relation to that storyline, I have to admit I was glad to see that The Pitt didn't simply move on to the next case here in '3:00 P.M.'" Nick Bythrow of Screen Rant wrote, "With the medical drama offering two big cliffhangers at the very end, it seems like dynamics are about to shift drastically during the next hour. The extent of Dana's injury is unclear and there's nothing concrete about how David is connected to the police visiting the hospital. The Pitt episode 9 served as a good episode in its own right, with plenty of compelling moments. But the buildup to episode 10 is what sticks by the time it comes to a close."

Johnny Loftus of Decider wrote, "All Dana Evans ever does is her best, and after breaking up a fight, trying to save a potential victim of human trafficking, and comforting her colleague who lost her pregnancy – all in the course of a few minutes – we'd say she's earned a moment for a quick cigarette in the loading dock. Doug Driscoll disagrees, and the aggressive racist from chairs cold-cocks her when she isn't looking. On The Pitt, the punches just keep coming." Gabriela Burgos Soler of Telltale TV wrote, "For the entirety of the season, Doug's behavior has grown a concerning amount, and it is no surprise that he finally got violent and even less surprising that he attacked a woman first. The question is if he will storm the ER and demand attention or if he simply ran away with an unknown destination."
