= Andy Rooney =

American radio and television journalist, commentator, and author (1919–2011)

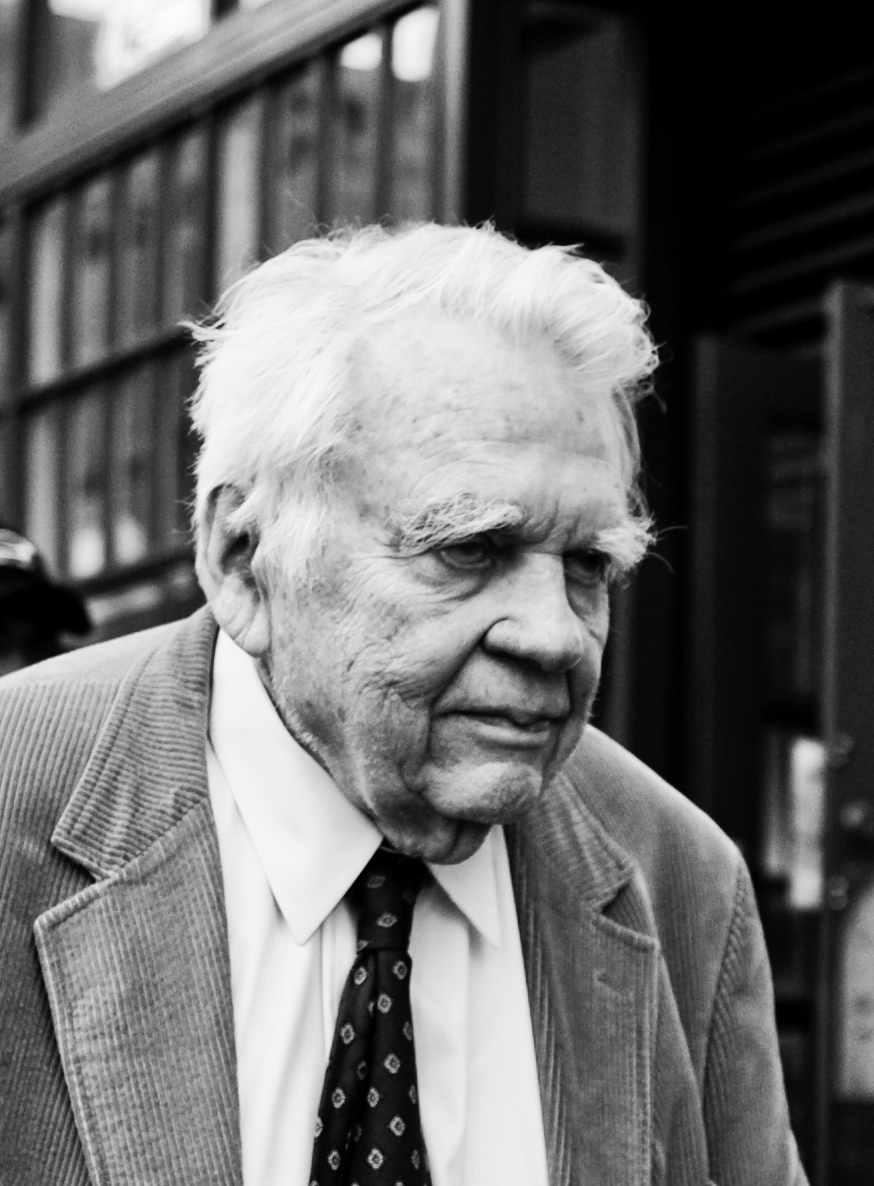
- Rooney in June 2008
- Born: Andrew Aitken Rooney; January 14, 1919; Albany, New York, U.S.
- Died: November 4, 2011 (aged 92); New York City, U.S.
- Education: Colgate University
- Spouse: Marguerite Rooney (m. 1942; died 2004)
- Children: 4, including Emily
- Writing career
- Years active: 1942–2011
- Notable work: The weekly broadcast "A Few Minutes with Andy Rooney" on 60 Minutes
- Notable awards: Emmy; 2003 Lifetime Achievement; 1980 "Tanks"; 1980 "Grain"; 1978 "Who Owns What in America"; 1968 "Black History: Lost, Stolen, or Strayed"
- Military service
- Allegiance: United States
- Branch: United States Army
- Service years: 1941–1945
- Rank: Sergeant
- Awards: Bronze Star Medal; Air Medal

Andrew Aitken Rooney (January 14, 1919 – November 4, 2011) was an American radio and television writer who was best known for his weekly broadcast "A Few Minutes with Andy Rooney", a part of the CBS News program 60 Minutes from 1978 to 2011. His final regular appearance on 60 Minutes aired on October 2, 2011; he died a month later at the age of 92.

== Early life and education ==
Andrew Aitken Rooney was born in Albany, New York, the son of Walter Scott Rooney (1888–1959) and Ellinor (Reynolds) Rooney (1886–1980). He attended The Albany Academy, and later attended Colgate University in Hamilton in central New York, where he was initiated into the Sigma Chi fraternity, before he was drafted into the United States Army in August 1941.

== World War II ==
Rooney began his career in newspapers in 1942 while in the Army where he began writing for Stars and Stripes in London. He was one of six correspondents who flew on the second American bombing raid over Germany in February 1943, flying with the Eighth Air Force. He was the first journalist to reach the Ludendorff Bridge after the 9th Armored Division captured it on March 7, 1945. He was 32 km (20 mi) to the west when he heard that the bridge had been captured. "It was a reporter's dream," he wrote. "One of the great stories of the war had fallen into my lap." The bridge capture was front-page news in America. Rooney rated the capture of the bridge as one of the top five events of the entire European war, alongside D-Day.

He was one of the first American journalists to visit the Nazi concentration camps near the end of World War II, and one of the first to write about them. During a segment on Tom Brokaw's The Greatest Generation, Rooney stated that he had been opposed to World War II because he was a pacifist. He recounted that what he saw in those concentration camps made him ashamed that he had opposed the war and permanently changed his opinions about whether "just wars" exist.

Rooney was decorated with the Bronze Star Medal and Air Medal for his service as a war correspondent in combat zones during the war. His 1995 memoir My War chronicles his war reporting and recounts several notable historical events and people from a first-hand view, including the entry into Paris and the Nazi concentration camps. He describes how it shaped his experience both as a writer and reporter.

== Career ==
Rooney joined CBS in 1949 as a writer for Arthur Godfrey's Talent Scouts, when Godfrey was at his peak on CBS radio and TV. It opened the show up to a variety of viewers. The program was a hit, reaching number one in 1952 during Rooney's tenure. It was the beginning of a close lifelong friendship between Rooney and Godfrey. He wrote for Godfrey's daytime radio and TV show Arthur Godfrey Time. He later moved on to The Garry Moore Show which became a hit program. During the same period, he wrote public affairs programs for CBS News, such as The Twentieth Century.

Rooney wrote his first television essay in 1964 called "An Essay on Doors", "a longer-length precursor of the type" that he did on 60 Minutes, according to CBS News's biography of him. From 1962 to 1968, he collaborated with CBS News correspondent Harry Reasoner, Rooney writing and producing and Reasoner narrating. They wrote on CBS News specials such as "An Essay on Bridges" (1965), "An Essay on Hotels" (1966), "An Essay on Women" (1967), and "The Strange Case of the English Language" (1968). In 1968, he wrote two episodes of the CBS News documentary series Of Black America, and his script for "Black History: Lost, Stolen, or Strayed" won him his first Emmy.

CBS refused to broadcast his World War II memoir titled "An Essay on War" in 1970, so Rooney quit CBS and read the opinion himself on PBS, which was his first appearance on television. That show in 1971 won him his third Writers Guild Award. He rejoined CBS in 1973 to write and produce special programs. He also wrote the script for the 1975 documentary FDR: The Man Who Changed America.

After his return to the network, Rooney wrote and appeared in several primetime specials for CBS, including In Praise of New York City (1974), the Peabody Award-winning Mr. Rooney Goes to Washington (1975), Mr. Rooney Goes to Dinner (1978), and Mr. Rooney Goes to Work (1977). Transcripts of these specials are contained in the book A Few Minutes with Andy Rooney, as well as of some of the earlier collaborations with Reasoner.

== "A Few Minutes with Andy Rooney" ==
Rooney's "end-of-show" segment on 60 Minutes, "A Few Minutes with Andy Rooney" (originally "Three Minutes or So with Andy Rooney"), began in 1978, as a summer replacement for the debate segment "Point/Counterpoint" featuring Shana Alexander and James Kilpatrick. The segment proved popular enough with viewers that beginning in the fall of 1978, it was seen in alternate weeks with the debate segment. At the end of the 1978–1979 season, "Point/Counterpoint" was dropped altogether.

In the segment, Rooney typically offered satire on a trivial everyday issue, such as the cost of groceries, annoying relatives, or faulty Christmas presents. Rooney's appearances on "A Few Minutes with Andy Rooney" often included whimsical lists, such as types of milk, bottled water brands, car brands, and sports mascots. In later years, his segments became more political as well. Despite being best known for his television presence on 60 Minutes, Rooney always considered himself a writer who incidentally appeared on television behind his famous walnut table, which he had made himself.

== Controversies ==
Rooney made a number of comments which elicited strong reactions from fans and producers alike.

=== Comments on race ===
In February 1990, CBS's 60 Minutes suspended Rooney for three months in part because it was alleged that he had suggested that black people were less intelligent because they "watered down their genes". After the program's ratings dropped significantly, Rooney was let back on in March. Rooney vehemently disputed this in a 1999 interview, claiming he was instead referring to lower-income people more broadly.

Rooney wrote a column in 1992 that posited that it was "silly" for Native Americans to complain about team names like the Redskins, saying, in part, "The real problem is, we took the country away from the Indians, they want it back and we're not going to give it to them. We feel guilty and we'll do what we can for them within reason, but they can't have their country back. Next question." After receiving many letters from Native Americans, he wrote, "when so many people complain about one thing, you have to assume you may have been wrong."

In a 2007 column for Tribune media services, he wrote, "I know all about Babe Ruth and Lou Gehrig, but today's baseball stars are all guys named Rodriguez to me." Rooney later commented, "Yeah, I probably shouldn't have said it, [but] it's a name that seems common in baseball now. I certainly didn't think of it in any derogatory sense."

=== Comments on same-sex unions ===
In 1990, Rooney was suspended without pay for three months by then–CBS News President David Burke, because of the negative publicity around his saying that "too much alcohol, too much food, drugs, homosexual unions, cigarettes [are] all known to lead to premature death." He wrote an explanatory letter to a gay organization after being ordered not to do so. After only four weeks without Rooney, 60 Minutes lost 20% of its audience. CBS management then decided that it was in the best interest of the network to have Rooney return immediately.

After Rooney's reinstatement, he made his remorse public:

There was never a writer who didn't hope that in some small way he was doing good with the words he put down on paper, and while I know it's presumptuous, I've always had in my mind that I was doing some little bit of good. Now, I was to be known for having done, not good, but bad. I'd be known for the rest of my life as a racist bigot and as someone who had made life a little more difficult for homosexuals. I felt terrible about that and I've learned a lot.

— Andy Rooney, Years of Minutes

=== Remarks on Kurt Cobain's suicide ===
In a 1994 segment, Rooney sparked controversy over his comments on Kurt Cobain’s suicide. He said he had never heard of Cobain nor his band Nirvana and criticized the suicide as a waste of life, comparing young people’s claims about suffering to “real problems” such as the Great Depression, World War II, and Vietnam War. He also disparaged Cobain’s drug use and suggested that public commotion should instead be given to another person, pointing at another name featured in the same obituary page of the newspaper: retired professor at Harvard University, Samuel E. Thorne.

On the following Sunday's show, he apologized on the air, saying he should have taken Cobain's depression into account. He also read only critical feedback from listeners without interjecting any commentary of his own.

== Collections and retirement ==
Rooney's shorter television essays have been archived in numerous books, such as Common Nonsense, released in 2002, and Years of Minutes, probably his best-known work, released in 2003. He penned a regular syndicated column for Tribune Media Services that ran in many newspapers in the United States, and which has been collected in book form. He won three Emmy Awards for his essays, which numbered over 1,000. He was awarded a Lifetime Achievement Emmy in 2003. Rooney's renown made him a frequent target of parodies and impersonations by a diverse group of comic figures, including Frank Caliendo, Rich Little and Beavis.

In 1993, CBS released a two-volume VHS tape set of the best of Rooney's commentaries and field reports, called The Andy Rooney Television Collection: His Best Minutes. In 2006, CBS released three DVDs of his more recent commentaries, Andy Rooney on Almost Everything, Things That Bother Andy Rooney, and Andy Rooney's Solutions.

Rooney's final regular appearance on 60 Minutes was on October 2, 2011, after 33 years on the show. It was his 1,097th commentary.

== Views ==
Rooney claimed on Larry King Live to have a liberal bias, stating, "There is just no question that I, among others, have a liberal bias. I mean, I'm consistently liberal in my opinions." In a controversial 1999 book, Rooney self-identified as agnostic, but by 2004 he was calling himself an atheist. He reaffirmed this in 2008. Over the years, many of his editorials poked fun at the concept of God and organized religion. Increased speculation on this was brought to a head by a series of comments he made regarding Mel Gibson's film The Passion of the Christ (2004).

Though Rooney has been called Irish-American, he once said "I'm proud of my Irish heritage, but I'm not Irish. I'm not even Irish-American. I am American, period."

In 2005, when four people were fired at CBS News perhaps because of the Killian documents controversy, Rooney said, "The people on the front lines got fired while the people most instrumental in getting the broadcast on escaped." Others at CBS had "kept mum" about the controversy.

== Personal life ==
Rooney was married to Marguerite "Margie" Rooney (née Howard) for 62 years, until her death from heart failure in 2004. He later wrote, "her name does not appear as often as it originally did [in my essays] because it hurts too much to write it." They had four children: Ellen, Emily, Martha, and Brian. His daughter Emily Rooney is a TV talk show host and former ABC News producer who went on to host a nightly Boston-area public affairs program, Greater Boston, on WGBH. Emily's identical twin, Martha Fishel, became chief of the Public Services Division at the National Library of Medicine in Bethesda, Maryland; her son Justin works as a producer for ABC News. His first daughter, Ellen Rooney, is a former film editor at ABC News and is now a travel and garden photographer based in London. His son, Brian Rooney, has been a correspondent for ABC since the 1980s and lives in Los Angeles.

Rooney also had a sister, Nancy Reynolds Rooney (1913–2007).

Rooney lived in the Rowayton section of Norwalk, Connecticut, as well as Rensselaerville, New York, and was a longtime season ticket holder for the New York Giants.

== Death ==
Rooney was hospitalized on October 25, 2011, after developing postoperative complications from an undisclosed surgical procedure, and died on November 4, 2011, at the age of 92, fewer than five weeks after his last appearance on 60 Minutes.

== Awards ==
- 2001: Emperor Has No Clothes Award from the Freedom from Religion Foundation.
- 2003: Walter Cronkite Award for Excellence in Journalism.

== Books ==
Books written by Rooney:

- Conquerors' Peace: Report to the American Stockholders, by Oram C. Hutton and Andrew A. Rooney. Garden City, N.Y.: Doubleday, 1947. (OCLC 3625849).
- The Fortunes of War: Four Great Battles of World War II, 1962 (OCLC 1350148).
- A Few Minutes With Andy Rooney, 1981 (ISBN 0-689-11194-0).
- And More by Andy Rooney, 1979 (ISBN 0-517-40622-5).
- Pieces of My Mind, 1984 (ISBN 0-689-11492-3).
- The Most of Andy Rooney, 1986 (ISBN 0-689-11864-3).
- Word for Word, 1988 (ISBN 0-399-13200-7).
- Not That You Asked ..., 1989 (ISBN 0-394-57837-6)
- Most of Andy Rooney, 1990 (ISBN 0-88365-765-1).
- Sweet and Sour, 1992 (ISBN 0-399-13774-2).
- My War, 1995 (ISBN 0-517-17986-5).
- Sincerely, Andy Rooney, 1999 (ISBN 1-891620-34-7).
- The Complete Andy Rooney, 2000 (ISBN 0-446-11219-4).
- Common Nonsense, 2002, (ISBN 1-586482-00-9).
- Years of Minutes, 2003 (ISBN 1-58648-211-4).
- Out of My Mind, 2006 (ISBN 1-58648-416-8).
- 60 Years of Wisdom and Wit, 2009 (ISBN 1-58648-773-6).

== See also ==
- Rooney (surname)
