= American Revolutionary: The Evolution of Grace Lee Boggs =

- Directed by: Grace Lee
- Written by: Grace Lee
- Produced by: Grace Lee; Caroline Libresco; Austin Wilkin
- Starring: Grace Lee Boggs
- Cinematography: Jerry A. Henry; Quyen Tran
- Edited by: Kim Roberts
- Music by: Vivek Maddala
- Production companies: Cherry Sky Pictures; Center for Asian American Media; Chicken & Egg Pictures
- Release date: June 16, 2013 (LAFF)
- Running time: 82 minutes
- Country: United States
- Language: English

American Revolutionary: The Evolution of Grace Lee Boggs is a 2013 American biographical documentary film directed by Grace Lee.

== Synopsis ==
Filmmaker Grace Lee tracks the evolving beliefs and activism of philosopher Grace Lee Boggs. Viewers learn about Boggs' activist contributions in Detroit and her involvement in the Black Power movement.

== Cast ==
- Grace Lee Boggs
- Grace Lee
- Bill Ayers
- Angela Davis
- Rich Feldman
- Danny Glover
- Shea Howell
- Invincible
- Scott Kurashige
- Julia Putnam
- Ron Scott
- Stephen Ward

== Release ==
American Revolutionary: The Evolution of Grace Lee Boggs premiered at the 2013 Los Angeles Film Festival. It received a limited theatrical release in Los Angeles on June 20, 2014, and aired on the PBS series POV on June 30, 2014.

== Reception ==
Rotten Tomatoes, a review aggregator, reports that 83% of six reviewers gave the film a positive review; the average rating was 7/10. Metacritic rated it 78/100 based on four reviews. Justin Chang of Variety called it a "lively and intelligent documentary" that is "spryly paced and deftly assembled". Frank Scheck of The Hollywood Reporter wrote, "In an era in which social activism is far too often derided, American Revolutionary: The Evolution of Grace Lee Boggs represents a deeply moving examination of the power of a single individual to affect change." Inkoo Kang of the Los Angeles Times described it as a "superb documentary" that is "admirably frank about the difficulties of insightfully portraying such a widely lauded — and subtly cagey and habitually self-effacing — figure."

Nicolas Rapold of The New York Times writes, "Ms. Lee could have delved more deeply into Ms. Boggs's thoughts, and slips into glib autopilot by using archival footage with sound effects or repeating ideas of personal transformation. But in sharing her subject's life achievements, she raises meaningful questions and keeps them profitably open." Scholar Ronald W. Bailey, in his review, said the film's "approach works well in providing an honest, compassionate portrait of an important life we should all want to better understand," and went on to state that "I learned new things from the film that will be useful in my continuing study and teaching... It treats the subject of this Asian American woman’s life in a way that will inform people of all nationalities and highlight linkages across the divides of color/race, class, culture and nationality, consciousness, gender, and age." Writing in Cineaste, critic Dan Georgakas states that Lee's "long-term commitment and craft as a director have resulted in an engaging portrait of a most remarkable woman. American Revolutionary also demonstrates that visual media can provide effective platforms for intellectual discourse."

It won the Audience Awards at Los Angeles Film Festival and the San Diego Asian Film Festival as well as Best Documentary at the Woodstock Film Festival.

In 2021, the documentary was also used as part of the May 19 Project. May 19 is the birth date of both Malcolm X and Yuri Kochiyama. The May 19th Project is a UCLA project meant to encourage and explore Asian American solidarity with the African American community. Clips from American Revolutionary are used to highlight how Boggs and her husband James Boggs "plant visionary seeds" and to explore what solidarity looks like.

== See also ==
- History of the Chinese Americans in Metro Detroit
