= Twiddler's syndrome =

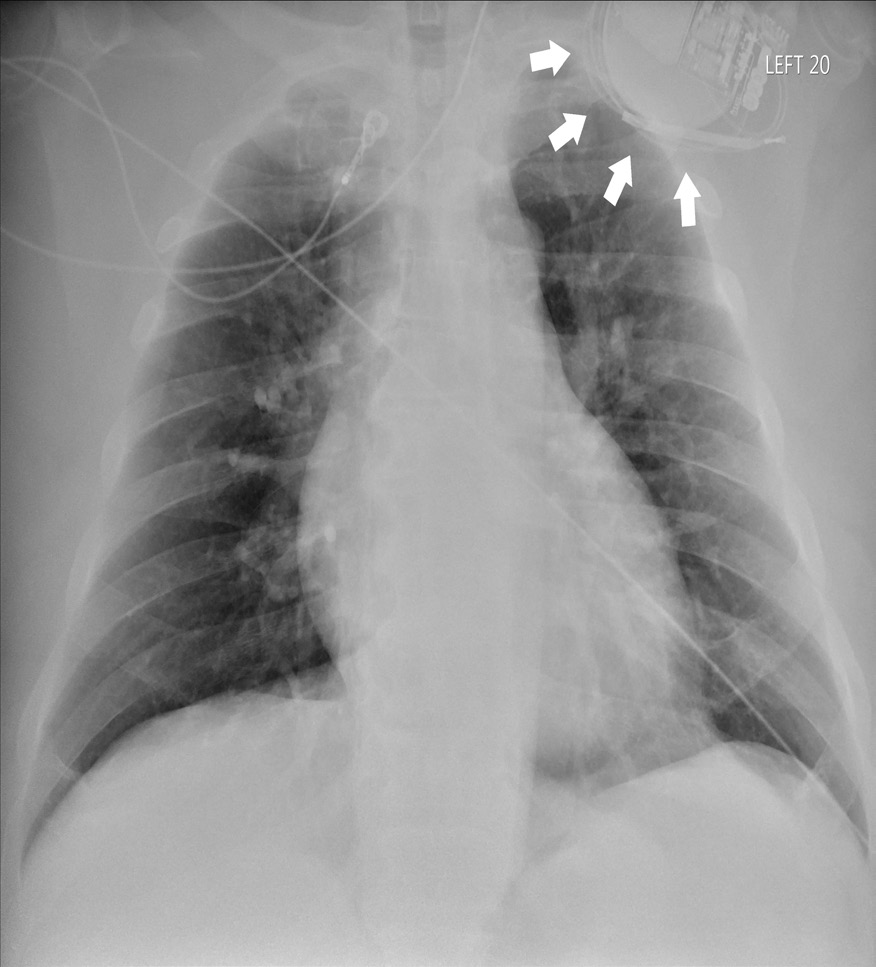
- Chest radiograph showing twiddler's syndrome. The leads of the automated external defibrillator are wrapped around the device and can't be seen in the ventricle.
- Specialty: Cardiology

Twiddler's syndrome is a malfunction of a pacemaker due to manipulation of the device and the consequent dislodging of the leads from their intended location. As the leads move, they stop pacing the heart and can cause strange symptoms such as phrenic nerve stimulation resulting in abdominal pulsing or brachial plexus stimulation resulting in rhythmic arm twitching. Twiddler's syndrome in patients with an implanted defibrilator may lead to inadequate, painful defibrillation-shocks.

== Signs and symptoms ==
Twiddler's syndrome presents with a range of symptoms, contingent on the extent of entanglement, the electrode's subsequent retraction, and the final location of the dislodged lead. Leads that become more dislodged can activate the ipsilateral phrenic nerves, which can result in hiccups, involuntary breathing spasms, or diaphragmatic contractions. The brachial plexus is stimulated by additional coiling and withdrawal of the lead, which causes regular arm twitches.

== Causes ==
Patient "twiddling," or manipulation, of the pulse generator within its skin pocket results in the device's painless dislodgment; lead dislodgement follows, eventually leading to pacemaker malfunction. There have also been reports of variations of this phenomenon resulting in the failure of implanted cardioverter-defibrillators and cardiac resynchronization therapy, which can be fatal.

=== Risk factors ===
The condition's risk factors include being a woman, being obese, belonging to an older age group, having cognitive impairments, and having an implanted device that is smaller than its pocket. A related increase in subcutaneous tissue laxity, especially in older patients, makes it easier for the device to become dislodged. Furthermore, the newer devices' smaller sizes make it easy for them to rotate inside the skin pocket.

== Diagnosis ==
Given its speed and ability to provide a clear image of the lead coiling and device rotation, the chest X-ray is the most straightforward and important diagnostic tool for Twiddler's syndrome.

== Treatment ==
Repositioning the pulse generator, implanting a new lead, and uncoiling the lead are among the treatments for diagnosed cases.
