= In-Ah Lee =

German film producer

In-Ah Lee (born in Germany) is a German film producer based in Los Angeles, California.

Prior to establishing LeeLee Films with writer/director Grace Lee, In-Ah Lee was head of production at the German-based Reverse Angle Production owned by Wim Wenders and his partner Peter Schwartzkopff. There, she was production executive on Wenders' The Soul of a Man (Cannes 2003), part of an Emmy-nominated seven-film series The Blues, executive produced by Martin Scorsese. She was also the executive producer at Wim Wenders Productions for commercials and music videos for clients such as Audi, Barilla, and Afri-Cola. Her producing credits include Don't Come Knocking, written by and starring Sam Shepard and directed by Wim Wenders (Cannes 2005, Competition) and Land of Plenty, also directed by Wenders and co-produced by Indigent and IFC Films (Venice 2004, Competition), as well as Grace Lee's Best of the Wurst and The Grace Lee Project (SXSW 2005).

In-Ah Lee was raised and educated in Hamburg, Germany, where she graduated from Law School in 1992. She worked for the Hamburg-based television production company SPIEGEL TV where she directed and produced long form interview programs, documentary features and talk shows. She moved to Los Angeles in 1998 where she worked for Ridley Scott Associates, a commercial production house with director Marcus Nispel.

She produced The Way I Spent the End of the World for Romanian director Catalin Mitulescu (Cannes 2006, Un Certain Regard, Best Actress Award), Grace Lee's American Zombie in Los Angeles, and Arvin Chen's Au Revoir Taipei, which won the NETPAC Asian Film Award at the 2010 Berlin International Film Festival. She joined with producers Philipp Steffens, Lynn Schmitz and Thomas Brettschneider to form Green Sky, a Cologne-based production house specializing in international coproductions and German independent cinema. Her upcoming projects includeCrumpacker and the Man from the Letter by Kazuo Ohno and Whirrrrrr by award-winning cinematographer Phedon Papamichael.
