= Grace Lee (director) =

American film director

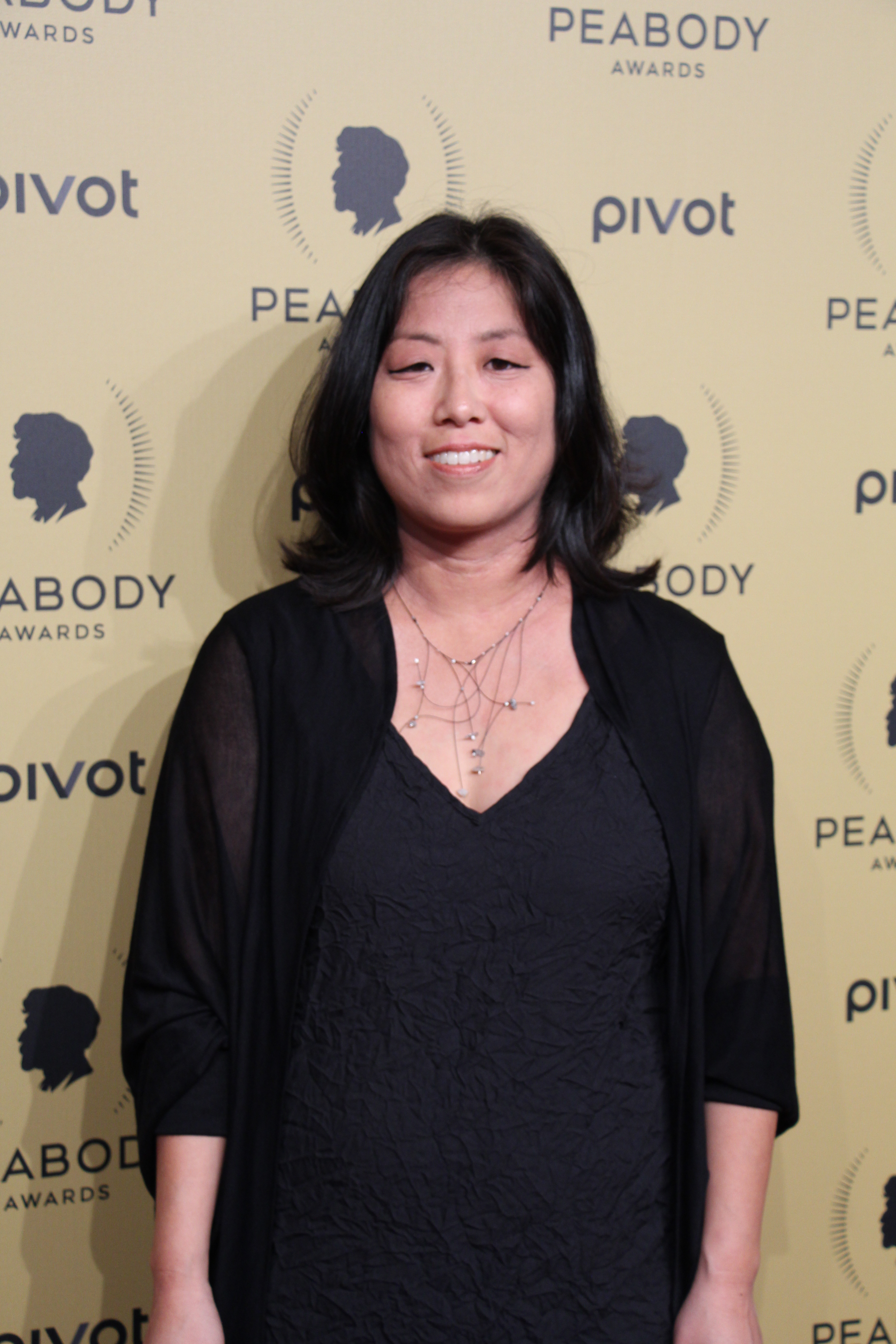
- Lee in 2015
- Born: 1968 or 1969 (age 57–58); Columbia, Missouri, U.S.
- Occupations: Film director, producer
- Notable work: The Grace Lee Project
- Website: gracelee.net

Grace Lee is an American director and producer. She is known for both her documentaries and narrative films, which often mix in elements of documentaries.

== Early life and education ==
Grace Lee was born in 1968 or 1969. She is of Korean heritage and grew up in Columbia, Missouri.

She originally wanted to be a journalist, but after interviewing sex workers in South Korea, she realized that she could tell better stories through film. Back in the United States, she enrolled in UCLA in Los Angeles, California.

== Career ==
Her first short, Girl Meets Boy was, according to Lee, a two-minute "response to those who have questioned my ability to speak loudly and in English". In 2000, she won a UCLA Spotlight Award for her short film The Ride Home. Barrier Device, her master's thesis, stars Sandra Oh and won a silver medal at the 29th Student Academy Awards. In 2002, she was profiled in Filmmaker as one of the New Faces of Independent Film. Her 2004 short film Best of the Wurst was nominated for the Berlin International Film Festival's Berlin Today Award and is featured in the Deutsches Currywurst Museum. Following this, she filmed The Grace Lee Project, a 2005 documentary about Asian-American women who share her name. With In-Ah Lee, she formed LeeLee Films in 2006.

American Zombie, her feature narrative film directorial debut, was released in 2007. A mockumentary about zombie civil rights in Los Angeles, it satirized her earlier experience with documentary films.

Janeane from Des Moines, released in 2012, is about a conservative housewife who attends the 2012 Republican Party primary in Iowa. The film mixes staged scenes and real interviews with Republican politicians, conducted in character without the knowledge of the media or politicians. ABC World News Tonight picked up the story, not realizing that Janeane is a fictional character. American Revolutionary: The Evolution of Grace Lee Boggs is a 2013 documentary about Grace Lee Boggs, an activist that Lee met while filming The Grace Lee Project. Her next documentary, Makers: Women in Politics, aired on PBS in September 2014 as part of a series based on Makers: Women Who Make America.

In December 2015, Off the Menu: Asian America, a documentary about Asian food, aired on PBS.

== Other activities ==
In 2020, Lee was one of 40 creatives who contributed a written piece for the Ford Foundation's Creative Futures series. Titled "More than one lens", her essay looked at inequitable funding by the public broadcaster PBS, comparing the amount of time and funding given to documentary-maker Ken Burns (a white man), compared to work by people of color. The essay inadvertently led to a controversy involving GBH news presenter Emily Rooney, after the BIPOC collective Beyond Inclusion had written to the PBS president asking for details about funding. Rooney suggested that work by filmmakers of color may not stand up to that of Burns. She later apologised publicly for her comments.

== Recognition ==
In November 2015, Lee received funding from the Sundance Institute as a part of the "Women at Sundance" Fellows program.

== Filmography ==
Title	Year	Director	Producer	Writer	Notes
Girl Meets Boy	2000	Yes	No	Yes	Short
The Ride Home	2000	Yes	No	Yes	Short
Barrier Device	2002	Yes	No	Yes	Short
Best of the Wurst	2004	Yes	No	No	Short, documentary
The Grace Lee Project	2005	Yes	Yes	Yes	Documentary
American Zombie	2007	Yes	No	Yes	Also co-stars as a fictionalized version herself
Janeane from Des Moines	2012	Yes	Yes	Yes	
American Revolutionary: The Evolution of Grace Lee Boggs	2013	Yes	Yes	Yes	Documentary
Makers: Women in Politics	2014	Yes	Yes	No	Documentary
Off the Menu: Asian America	2015	Yes	No	No	Documentary
