= News producer =

The news producer takes all the elements of a newscast (packages, video, graphics, etc.) and compiles them into a cohesive show.

In the hierarchy of the newsroom, the news producer is under the executive producer, who reports to the news director. The news producer is usually on the same level as the anchor, although this may differ from newsroom to newsroom. The news producer is over the director, studio crew, reporters, field crew, photographers, editors, etc.

== Responsibilities ==
The news producer's responsibilities are wide-ranging. In no particular order of importance, they:

- Write the script for the news anchor(s) to read (though in some Designated Market Areas, the anchor(s) prefer to write this themselves)
- Organize the show, to ensure that there is good "flow"
- Gather leads for possible stories
- Monitor the wire agencies/network feeds for potential stories
- Edit video for voice-overs
- Time the show, so it starts and ends on time, and contains all the commercial breaks necessary
- Communicate with the anchors, director, and studio crew while filming the show
- Keep in touch with reporters and crew in the field in order to monitor how stories are developing
- Write in-show and pre-show teases
- Coordinate live shots.
