= Center for Asian American Media =

American media and culture organization

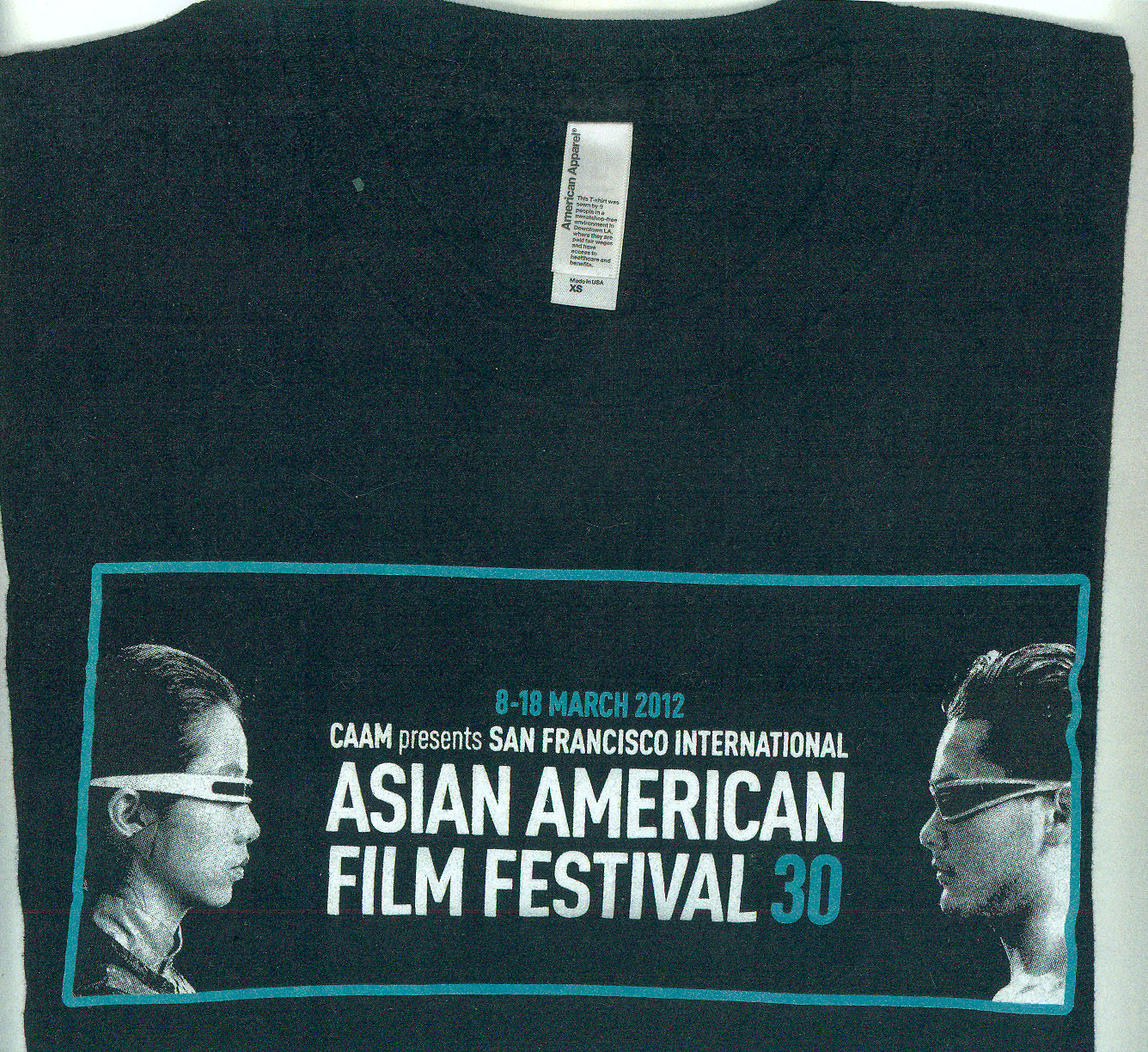
Commemorative T-shirt made for the 30th anniversary of the San Francisco International Asian American Film Festival in 2012. The image shows actors Tiana Alexandra and Mark Dacascos

The Center for Asian American Media (CAAM) was founded in 1980. The San Francisco–based organization, formerly known as the National Asian American Telecommunications Association (NAATA), has grown into the largest organization dedicated to the advancement of Asian Americans in independent media, specifically the areas of television and filmmaking.

== History ==
A Formula for Change was a report published by the Task Force on Minorities in Public Broadcasting appointed by the Corporation for Public Broadcasting (CPB). It was released in 1978 which outlined the deficiency of programs for minorities in the public sector of media. Individual producers, television stations, and advocates for minority representation formed the Minority Consortia in which NAATA was one of the key components within this core group. The inception of NAATA, now known as CAAM, at the beginning of the 1980s came at a key moment in the historical development of Asian American media. Earlier in 1971, Los Angeles–based activists and artists established Visual Communications (VC), a community-based organization that had been instrumental in helping to create many early examples of Asian American filmmaking, including the first Asian American feature film, Robert A. Nakamura's Hito Hata: Raise the Banner in 1980. In New York, Asian CineVision (ACV) formed in 1976 and pursued similar goals as VC, helping to nurture a nascent East Coast filmmaking community. By 1978, ACV had organized the first festival named Asian American International Film Festival which showcased many independent Asian American filmmakers in the event.

Along with CAAMFest, CAAM as a nonprofit organization helps in funding and disseminating Asian American film and media. CAAM also has career opportunities, several programs, and community building initiatives.

== Public broadcast ==
With the support of the Corporation for Public Broadcasting (CPB), the Center for Asian American Media works with the national Public Broadcast Service (PBS) and its regional networks, local PBS stations, PBS series such as POV and the Independent Television Service (ITVS). Since launching the groundbreaking Asian American anthology series “Silk Screen” (1982-1987) on PBS, CAAM continues to bring award-winning works to millions of viewers nationwide. CAAM is one of five minority public broadcasting consortia designated by the Corporation for Public Broadcasting (CPB) to provide programming to the Public Broadcast Service (PBS). Over $3 million has flowed through CAAM's Media Fund since 1990, putting life into (or polish onto) dozens of acclaimed and award-winning projects.

== Film festival ==
Other commitments forced CAAM to shelve the festival in 1985 but beginning in 1986, CAAM took over planning, programming and management of the San Francisco International Asian American Film Festival. Since then, the SFIAAFF has since become the largest of its kind in America, with over 100 films screened over the course of 10 days and two cities (San Francisco and Berkeley). Unlike similar festivals, such as VC's Los Angeles Asian American Film Festival, the SFIAAFF was a non-competitive showcase but starting in 2005, it created its first competitive awards for Best Asian American Feature and Best Asian American Documentary, providing a cash prize to emergent filmmakers to help support their project development. In 2007, the Wallace Foundation awarded CAAM with $514,000 to use current digital media to broaden and diversify the audience for the San Francisco International Asian American Film Festival. Some films that came from CAAM and its supported films are: Who Killed Vincent Chin?, Days of Waiting, a.k.a. Don Bonus, American Revolutionary: The Evolution of Grace Lee Boggs, K-Town'92, Minding the Gap.

With the expansion of the festival, CAAM announced in January 2013 the name change of the SFIAAFF to CAAMFest. The new Festival will showcase film as well as other avenues of artistic expression and community engagement, such as music, food, and interactive workshops. Since 2013, CAAMFest has served as a platform for all film and media supported by CAAM, filled with sponsors, awards, presentations, and galas. Although it for media, CAAMFests have become festivals that celebrate film as well as music and food. After 2013, some festivals have been themed like CAAMFest35 in 2017, yesterday today tomorrow, which highlighted CAAM's past, present, and future in Asian American media. CAAMFest36 in 2018 had a theme of Culture, In Every Sense.

== Programs ==
CAAM works with the mass media to share with the world diversity and Asian Americans experiences. In order to achieve their goal, CAAM created the following programs:

Public Media: Since 1982, CAAM has made hundreds of films and presented Asian American works on public television.

CAAMFest.

Media Fund: CAAM created the Media Fund in 1990 in order to give money to Asian American filmmakers. For independent Asian American filmmakers, taking money from CAAM had both benefits and risks attached. CAAM offered funding through the Media Fund during and after production, which granted filmmakers the assets to create their productions and avenues to publicize their work. Those who chose to take the Media Fund also had to waive broadcasting rights to CAAM. It also has certain conditions that those filmmakers had to follow, in that filmmakers did not have the independence to determine if their films would be broadcast at peak times. Showing these films at non-peak viewing hours lessened the attention to each production, posing a risk to the independence of filmmakers deciding to take the media fund or not. However, if the independent Asian American filmmakers took the money from CAAM then they had higher chances of broadcasting the work, although slim because only 14% of the 193 projects from 1999 to 2001 were chosen.

Multi-Platform Storytelling or Trans-media Storytelling: Through the use of various media outlets, CAAM ensures that Asian American works are presented.

Memories to Light: Asian American Home Movies: CAAM created this program to encourage Asian American communities to document in film their stories and experiences through the making of home movies. CAAM then collects and share those home movies to the world.

Educational Distribution: CAAM has the largest number of movies, documentaries and other Asian American works that are used for educational purposes.

CAAM Fellowship Program is an opportunity to foster growth among Asian American documentary filmmakers, producers, and directors. This is path available to those who wish to develop their own skills alongside mentors and fellows, whether current cinematographers or those looking to get into the directing or producing aspects of film.

Muslim Youth Voices Project: A program created for young people of the Muslim faith so that they can tell their stories and experiences of being Muslims to the world.

== See also ==
- San Francisco International Asian American Film Festival
- Asian American theatre
- Corporation for Public Broadcasting
