= Rongeur =

Surgical Instrument for removing bone

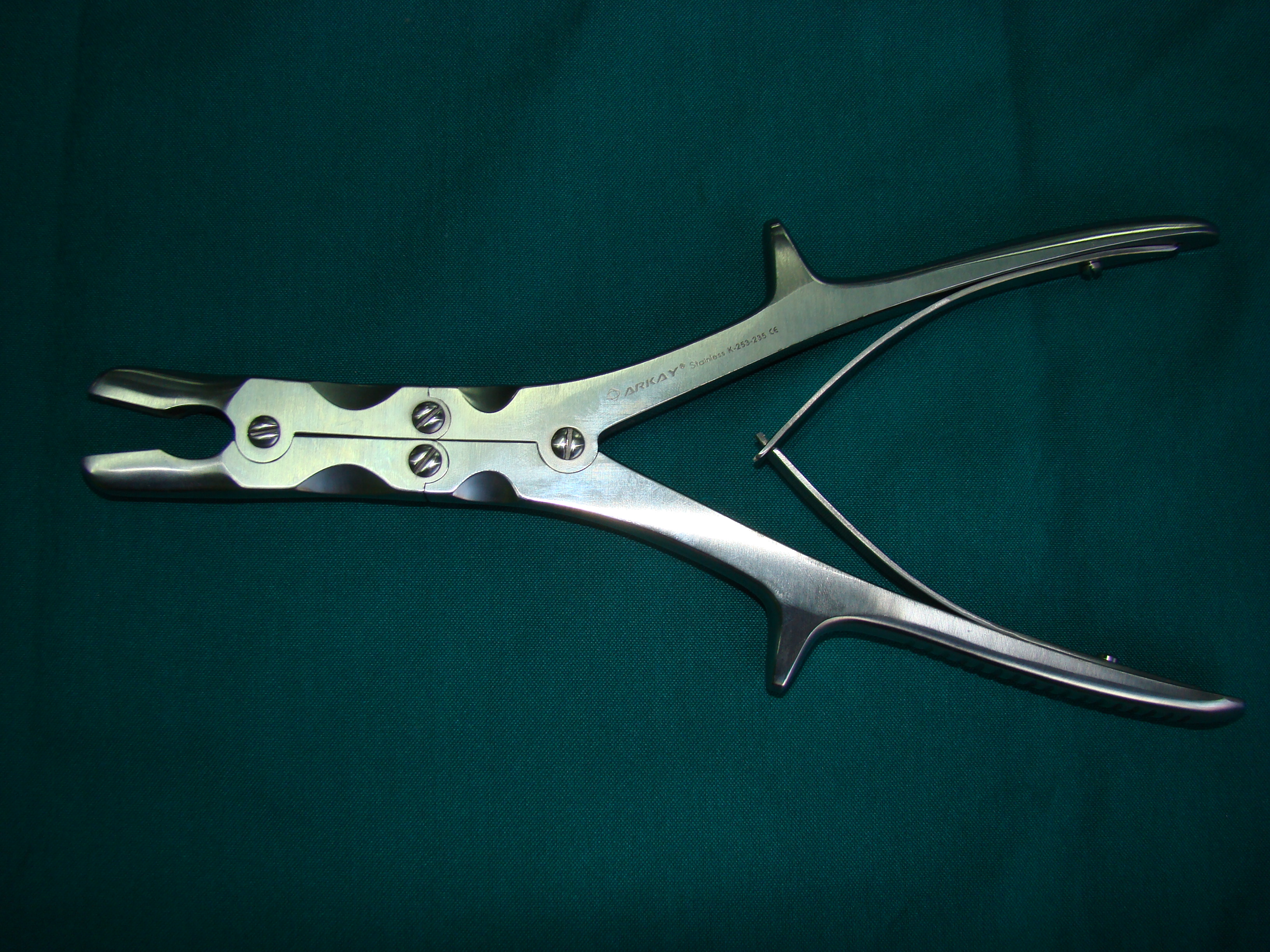
Rongeur

A rongeur is heavy-duty surgical instrument with a sharp-edged, scoop-shaped tip, used for gouging out bone. Rongeur is a French word meaning rodent or 'gnawer'. A rongeur can be used to open a window in bone, often in the skull, in order to access tissue underneath. They are used in neurosurgery, podiatric surgery, maxillofacial surgery, and orthopedic surgery to expose areas for operation.

A rongeur is used in oral maxillofacial surgery to remove bony fragments or soft tissue. It is also used in hand surgery to cut traumatic amputated bone to allow skin to be closed over the defect. A rongeur can also be used in cadaver dissection lab to break through ribs when removing the anterior chest wall. A common example of a surgical rongeur is the Kerrison rongeur, in which its first design was created by Dr. Robert Masters Kerrison (1776–1847), an English physician, but it took more than 100 years before the Kerrison rongeur was modified and took its current form.

== See also ==
- Instruments used in general surgery
