= CAAMFest =

Asian American film festival in San Francisco, California, U.S.

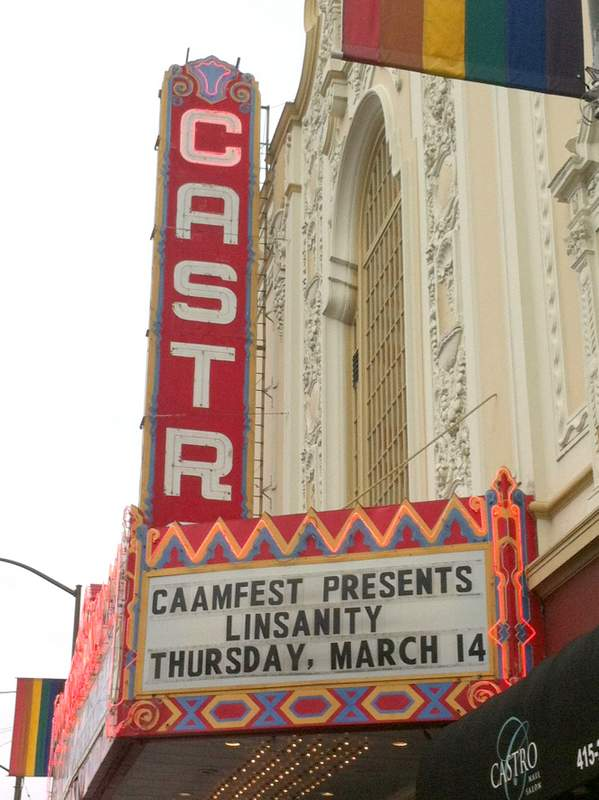
- Linsanity was shown opening night of CAAMFest in 2013 in San Francisco.
- Location: San Francisco; Berkeley; San Jose
- Founded: 1982
- Hosted by: Center for Asian American Media
- No. of films: 130
- Language: International
- Website: https://caamfest.com/

CAAMFest, known prior to 2013 as the San Francisco International Asian American Film Festival (SFIAAFF), is presented every May (Asian American and Pacific Islander Heritage Month) in the San Francisco Bay Area in the United States as the nation's largest showcase for new Asian American and Asian films. It annually presents approximately 130 works in San Francisco, Berkeley and San Jose. The festival is organized by the Center for Asian American Media.

== History ==
CAAMFest traces its roots to Asian CineVision's New York Asian American Film Festival, begun in 1978. From 1981 to 1984, ACV spun off a traveling version of their festival that toured the U.S. CAAM partnered with ACV to showcase their traveling festival in San Francisco, adding in other films by local filmmakers to help round out the program.

The San Francisco International Asian American Film Festival (SFIAAFF) was founded in 1982 as a joint production between Asian CineVision and the Center for Asian American Media (CAAM). There was no festival in 1985; beginning in 1986 the festival was organized by CAAM. Although the festival originally began with exclusively Asian American work, over the course of the 1990s, they expanded to include works from Asian filmmakers, reflecting an attention to the increasingly transnational forms of media moving between Asia and America. With the expansion of the festival, CAAM announced in January 2013 the name change of the SFIAAFF to CAAMFest. The new Festival will showcase film as well as other avenues of artistic expression and community engagement, such as music, food, and interactive workshops.

== Locations ==
While the majority of the films at the festival screen at the Sundance Kabuki in Japantown and the Castro Theatre in San Francisco, many films are also screened at the Pacific Film Archive in Berkeley and at the Camera 3 Downtown Cinemas in San Jose.

== Awards and premieres ==
The SFIAAFF inaugurated in 2005 a juried competition in two categories as well as audience awards. In 2010 Emmy-nominated documentary Wo Ai Ni (I Love You) Mommy made its world premiere at the SFIAAFF and went on to win Best Documentary at the festival.

The documentary film Linsanity premiered at CAAMFest on March 14, 2013, and won several audience awards. The Vietnamese comedy film How to Fight in Six Inch Heels had its U.S. premiere at CAAMFest on March 13, 2014.
