= Aaron Takahashi =

American actor

Aaron Takahashi is an American actor. He is best known for his roles as the "male nurse" Lee in the film Yes Man (2008), one of the fake groomsmen in The Wedding Ringer (2015), as Troy in the film Welcome to the Jungle (2013), and his various roles on the talk show Conan on TBS, with Conan O'Brien. Takahashi has appeared in over 50 national commercials since 2004.

== Early life and education ==
Takahashi graduated from North Torrance High School. Takahashi worked at Meidi-Ya supermarket while attending the University of Southern California (USC). He graduated with a degree in English and an emphasis on creative writing. After graduation, he became the manager of the store. After the store closed, Takahashi pursued acting full time.

== Career ==
=== Film ===
Takahashi has appeared as the character "Takashi" in Justin Lin's directorial debut, Better Luck Tomorrow (2002). He also appeared in the film Memoirs of a Geisha (2005) as a Rickshaw Runner, and in Lane Nishikawa's film Only the Brave (2006) as one of the 442 2nd Squad soldiers. Takahashi has additionally appeared as the male nurse character "Lee" in Peyton Reed's Yes Man opposite Jim Carrey. In 2013, Takahashi appeared as "Troy" in Rob Meltzer's Welcome to the Jungle (2013) opposite Jean-Claude Van Damme. In 2015, Takahashi appeared as Endo/Rambis (named after the coach Kurt Rambis), one of Josh Gad's character's "fake groomsmen" in Jeremy Garelick's The Wedding Ringer, starring Kevin Hart and Josh Gad.

In addition to Better Luck Tomorrow, Takahashi has appeared in independent films such as Kiyong Kim's Ku Klux Korena (2007) (as Jin), Teruhisa Yoshida's Robert Hearts Miss Ing (2008), Tom Huang's Why Am I Doing This? (2009)(as Sung), James Huang's Starting From Scratch (2013) (as Jim), Peter O'Melia's The Grounds (2014) (as Applicant #4), and as Aaron, a fictionalized version of himself, in Awesome Asian Bad Guys (2013-2014), directed by Patrick Epino and Stephen Dypiangco.

Takahashi has also appeared in various short films such as Mike Nojun Park's Re: Your Balls (2009) (as Matt), James Huang's Represent (2010) (as Aaron), and Roman Cortez's My Best Friend Bigfoot Ep.1 & 2. (2010) (as Scott).

=== Television ===
Takahashi has appeared in a number of TV series, including Asia Street Comedy (2004-2005) (various characters), Reno 911! (as a Thai Delivery Man and a Storeowner), The Bill Engvall Show (2009) (as a Driver), Whacked (as a Korean Shopkeeper), Traffic Light (as a Nerdy Dad), Mr. Sunshine (as Jerry), ACME Saturday Night (as various characters), Community (as the Math Club Leader in the episode "A Fistful of Paintballs" Dir. Joe Russo), The Mentalist (as Tai Nguyen), Ben and Kate (as Shawn), Sullivan & Son (as Dr. Park), The Big Bang Theory (as a scientist), The Millers (as Kevin), Conan (as various characters), Drunk History (as a guest) and Dog Park (as Neal).

Takahashi currently has recurring roles in both the Yahoo! Screen original series Sin City Saints (as social media guru Henry), and the USA Network series Mr. Robot (as Allsafe Security employee Lloyd).

=== Advertisement and other work ===
Takahashi has appeared in over 50 national ad campaigns for brands such as Snapple, the NFL, Esurance, McDonald's, Arlo Technologies and Amp'd Mobile (where he plays a worker that raps the song "U and Dat" (featuring T-Pain and Kandi Girl) out loud in a bathroom before another employee notice him). Takahashi also provides the voice of "Paul Tard" in the videogame Slumber Party Slaughterhouse: The Game (2008).

Takahashi has also appeared on stage in Paul Kikuchi's Slice, at the Fremont Theater in Pasadena.

He has been trained at East West Players, where he teaches the annual "On-Camera Commercial and Audition Class." He has also been a writer and performing member of the ACME Comedy Theater, and is also currently a workshop instructor and core performing member of the improv group Cold Tofu.

He was an honoree at East West Players 2019 Night Market for "advancing the visibility of Asian Americans nationally" through his work.

== Filmography ==
=== Film ===
Year	Title	Role	Notes
2002	Better Luck Tomorrow	Takashi	
2005	Memoirs of a Geisha	Rickshaw Runner	Uncredited
2006	Only the Brave	442 2nd Squad	
2007	Reno 911!: Miami	Japanese Tourist	Uncredited
2007	Balls of Fury	Ling	Uncredited
2007	Ku Klux Kornea	Jin	
2008	Yes Man	Lee	
2009	Why Am I Doing This?	Sung	
2013	Starting from Scratch	Jim	
2013	Welcome to the Jungle	Troy	
2014	Awesome Asian Bad Guys	Aaron	
2015	The Wedding Ringer	Endo / Rambis	
2018	The Grounds	Applicant #4	

=== Television ===
Year	Title	Role	Notes
2004–2005	Asia Street Comedy	Various Characters	3 episodes
2007, 2008	Reno 911!	Thai Delivery Man / Store Owner	2 episodes
2009	The Bill Engvall Show	Driver	Episode: "Car Trouble"
2009–2011	ACME Saturday Night	Various	16 episodes
2010	Whacked	Korean Shopkeeper	Episode: "Weapon of Choice"
2011	Traffic Light	Nerdy Dad	Episode: "All the Precedent's Men"
2011	Mr. Sunshine	Jerry	2 episodes
2011	Community	Math Club Leader	Episode: "A Fistful of Paintballs"
2011–2019	Conan	Various roles	15 episodes
2012	The Mentalist	Tai Nguyen	Episode: "Not One Red Cent"
2012, 2013	Ben and Kate	Shawn	2 episodes
2013	Sullivan & Son	Dr. Park	Episode: "The Pilot, One More Time"
2013	The Big Bang Theory	Scientist	Episode: "The Hofstadter Insufficiency"
2013	Back in the Game	Billy	Episode: "She. Could. Go. All. The. Way!"
2014	The Millers	Kevin	Episode: "Walk-n-Wave"
2014	Dog Park	Neal	9 episodes
2015	Sin City Saints	Henry	6 episodes
2015	Comedy Bang! Bang!	Wally	Episode: "Mary Elizabeth Winstead"
2015–2019	Mr. Robot	Lloyd Chung	7 episodes
2016	New Girl	Car Rental Employee	Episode: "Road Trip"
2017	Bajillion Dollar Propertie$	Donny	Episode: "Disaster Drills"
2017	American Vandal	Mr. Maeda	Episode: "Gag Order"
2018	Best.Worst.Weekend.Ever.	Donut Guy	Episode: "Issue 2"
2018–2019	Drunk History	Various roles	3 episodes
2019–2020	Sydney to the Max	Mr. Tanaka	4 episodes
2020	Curb Your Enthusiasm	Alex	Episode: "Elizabeth, Margaret and Larry"
2021	Awkwafina Is Nora from Queens	Jacques	Episode: "Shadow Acting"
2021–2022	Kenan	Bruce	4 episodes
