= Come as You Are =

Come as You Are may refer to:

== Film and television ==
- Come as You Are (2011 film), a Belgian film
- Come as You Are (2019 film), an American remake of the Belgian film
- "Come as You Are" (CSI: Miami), an episode of CSI: Miami
- "Come as You Are", an episode of Instant Star

== Music ==
=== Albums ===
- Come as You Are (album), a 1987 album by Peter Wolf
- Come as You Are, a 2004 album by Mindi Abair
- Come as You Are, a 1976 album by Ashford & Simpson
- Come as You Are, a 2004 album by Beverley Knight
- Come as You Are, a 2005 album by Jaci Velasquez

=== Songs ===
- "Come as You Are" (Beverley Knight song)
- "Come as You Are" (Nirvana song)
- "Come as You Are", a song by Brandy Norwood from Afrodisiac
- "Come as You Are", a song by Pocket Full of Rocks
- "Come as You Are", a song by Tenille Townes from The Lemonade Stand
- "Come as You Are", a song by Santana from Santana IV
- "Come as You Are", a song by Wild Orchid from Oxygen
- "Come as You Are", a song by Peter Wolf
- "Come as You Are", a song by Crowder

== Other uses ==
- Come as You Are: The Story of Nirvana, a book by Michael Azerrad
- Come as You Are (sex shop), a Toronto-based co-operative sex shop
- Come as You Are: The Surprising New Science That Will Change Your Sex Life, a book by Emily Nagoski
- Aberdeen, Washington motto

== See also ==
- Casual, a type of dress code
- Dress code, the unwritten rule of clothing
