= Grant Rosenmeyer =

American actor and screenwriter (born 1991)

- Born: July 3, 1991 (age 35); Manhasset, New York, U.S.
- Education: New York University (BFA)
- Occupations: Actor, screenwriter
- Years active: 2000–present

Grant Mandel Rosenmeyer (born July 3, 1991) is an American actor and screenwriter best known for his roles in The Royal Tenenbaums and on the FOX television sitcom Oliver Beene.

== Early life and education ==
Rosenmeyer was born in Manhasset, New York, the son of Jewish parents Debra and Colin Rosenmeyer. He grew up in Ridgefield, Connecticut and earned a Bachelor of Fine Arts degree from New York University's Tisch School of the Arts in 2012.

== Career ==
Rosenmeyer first acted on Broadway as Macduff's son in Macbeth and as Gavroche in Les Misérables. In 2001, he made his feature film debut as Ari Tenenbaum, Ben Stiller's son, in Wes Anderson's The Royal Tenenbaums, for which he received a Young Artist Award nomination.

From 2003 to 2004, Rosenmeyer played the title character in the FOX television sitcom Oliver Beene, produced by Steven Levitan. He has made guest appearances on Late Night with Conan O'Brien, Monk, Jonny Zero, Blue Bloods and Crazy Ex-Girlfriend, among others. He also appeared as Wilson, a Make-A-Wish patient that blackmails Larry David, in a memorable episode of Curb Your Enthusiasm. Additional film credits include Young Mordechai in The Hebrew Hammer.

In June 2009, Rosenmeyer's short film Fugue won the award for Best Student Film at the Connecticut Film Festival. He co-wrote and starred in The Smut Locker, a short comedy which garnered a CINE Golden Eagle Award in 2014. That same year, his feature script The Defectives was a semifinalist for the Nicholl Fellowships in Screenwriting.

He appeared alongside Julia Roberts and George Clooney in the 2016 film Money Monster, directed by Jodie Foster. He also starred opposite Lindsey Shaw in the romantic comedy Temps in 2016, as well as the heist comedy Chasing the Blues in 2018.

Most recently, Rosenmeyer produced and starred in Come As You Are, a road trip dramedy based on the real-life experience of Asta Philpot, opposite Gabourey Sidibe, Hayden Szeto and Ravi Patel. The film premiered at South by Southwest in March 2019 before going on to win numerous audience and jury prizes at other festivals, and was acquired for release by Samuel Goldwyn Films.

== Filmography ==
=== Film ===
Year	Title	Role	Notes
2001	The Royal Tenenbaums	Ari Tenenbaum	
2003	The Hebrew Hammer	Young Mordechai	
2007	I Do & I Don't	Mark, The Son	
2008	Fugue	Hal Gordon	Also director and writer
2010	The Red Hunter	The Thief	Voice
2014	Fairfield	Tucker Donovan	
2016	Temps	Jefferson	
2016	Money Monster	Tech Dave	
2017	Chasing the Blues	Alan Thomas	
2018	All You Can Eat	Matty	
2019	Come as You Are	Scotty	Also producer
2021	Shook	Kellan	
2021	The Beta Test	APE Agent	
2023	The Secret Art of Human Flight	Ben Grady	

=== Television ===
Year	Title	Role	Notes
2000	TV Funhouse	Jokámel Boy	Episode: "Mexicans Day"
2003–2004	Oliver Beene	Oliver David Beene	24 episodes
2005	Jonny Zero	Seth Morganstern	Episode: "Man Up"
2005	Monk	Young Adrian Monk	Episode: "Mr. Monk and Little Monk"
2005	Curb Your Enthusiasm	Wilson	Episode: "The Smoking Jacket"
2006	Teachers	Adam Pelekis	Episode: "Substitute"
2011	Blue Bloods	Brian	Episode: "Mercy"
2014	The Emperors	Milo Finch	Television film
2015–2019	Crazy Ex-Girlfriend	Jason	4 episodes
