= Yes, We're Open =

- Theatrical release poster
- Directed by: Richard Wong
- Screenplay by: H.P. Mendoza
- Produced by: Theresa Navarro; Duane Anderson
- Starring: Lynn Chen; Parry Shen; Sheetal Sheth; Kerry McCrohan
- Cinematography: Richard Wong
- Edited by: Richard Wong
- Music by: H.P. Mendoza
- Production company: Greenrocksolid
- Distributed by: Cherry Sky Films
- Release dates: March 11, 2012 (San Francisco International Asian American Film Festival); October 12, 2012 (United States)
- Running time: 80 minutes
- Country: United States
- Language: English

Yes, We're Open is a 2012 American independent film directed by Richard Wong and written by H.P. Mendoza, the first collaboration between Wong and Mendoza since their 2006 debut film, Colma: The Musical. The film premiered March 11, 2012 at the San Francisco International Asian American Film Festival. After a year of touring the film festival circuit and winning Best Screenplay at the Los Angeles Asian Pacific Film Festival, Yes, We're Open was released on home video on October 12, 2012.

== Plot ==
Proud San Franciscans Luke and Sylvia consider themselves a staple "modern" couple until another provocative duo, Elena and Ronald, challenge their status and trigger their experiments in open relationship.

== Cast ==
- Lynn Chen as Silvia
- Parry Shen as Luke
- Sheetal Sheth as Elena
- Kerry McCrohan as Ronald
- Theresa Navarro as Cassie
- Tasi Alabastro as Scott
- H.P. Mendoza as "Nobody"

== Awards and nominations ==
- Centerpiece - San Francisco International Asian American Film Festival
- Best Screenplay - Los Angeles Asian Pacific Film Festival

== Reception ==
Dennis Harvey of Variety gave the film a favorable review, calling it a "satirical dart aimed at the conflict between trendy mores vs. personal limits", while Ben Sachs of the Chicago Reader gave the film a mixed review saying "the acting can be downright amateurish".

== See also ==
- Colma: The Musical (2006), film directed by Richard Wong
- Fruit Fly (2009), film directed by H.P. Mendoza
