= I Am a Ghost =

- Festival Poster
- Directed by: H.P. Mendoza
- Written by: H.P. Mendoza
- Produced by: Mark Del Lima
- Starring: Anna Ishida; Jeannie Barroga; Rick Burkhardt
- Cinematography: H.P. Mendoza
- Edited by: H.P. Mendoza
- Music by: H.P. Mendoza
- Distributed by: Level 33 Entertainment, Gravitas Ventures, Ersatz Film
- Release dates: March 9, 2012 (SFIAAF); October 29, 2014 (United States)
- Running time: 76 minutes
- Country: United States
- Language: English
- Budget: $10,000

I Am a Ghost, is a 2012 American horror film directed by H.P. Mendoza. It debuted at the 2012 San Francisco International Asian American Film Festival and was acquired by Gravitas Ventures and distributed in 2014.

The film was acquired by Level 33 Entertainment for its 10th anniversary in 2024.

== Plot ==
During an indeterminable time period, Emily (Anna Ishida), a troubled ghost who died, haunts her own Victorian house every day, wondering why she can't leave. With the help of Sylvia, (Jeannie Barroga), a clairvoyant hired to rid the house of spirits, Emily is forced into a 'patient/therapist' relationship, uncovering disturbing mysteries about her past that may help her move on to 'the next place'.

== Cast ==
- Anna Ishida as Emily
- Jeannie Barroga as Sylvia (voice)
- Rick Burkhardt as Demon
- Jef Cunningham as Doctor (voice)
- Maia Mendoza as Sister (voice)
- Rachel Wong as Mother (voice)

== Production ==
I Am a Ghost cost roughly $10,000 with a substantial amount of it raised on Kickstarter, $7500 of which was for actual production.

== Critical reception ==
Dennis Harvey of Variety wrote, "within its chosen narrative and physical limitations, the pic is artfully and resourcefully crafted on a small budget." Shawn Handling from HorrorNews.net gave the film a negative review, criticizing the script, acting, and runtime, while also commending the cinematography and special effects. Scott Hallam from Dread Central rated the film a score of three and a half out of five, criticizing the first half as "repetitive", while commending the effects, and finale.

== Awards ==
- Best Film, Audience Award - La Samain Du Cinema Fantastique 2013
- Best Director, Audience Award - La Samain Du Cinema Fantastique 2013
- Best Film Audience Award - Nocturna Madrid International Fantastic Film Festival
- Best Picture - Bram Stoker International Film Festival 2012
- Best Horror Film - PollyGrind Film Festival
- Best Horror Director - SF Weekly 2012
- Best Horror Director - Tucson Terrorfest 2012
- Best Actress - Tucson Terrorfest 2012
- Best Actress - MIX Mexico 2012
- Best Actress - Molins Horror Film Festival
