= Steven Levitan Productions =

American television production company

- Type: Private
- Industry: Production company
- Founded: 1994; 32 years ago in Beverly Hills, California, U.S.
- Founder: Steven Levitan
- Headquarters: Beverly Hills, California, U.S.
- Key people: Steven Levitan (CEO); Danielle Stokdyk (President)
- Owner: Steven Levitan

Steven Levitan Productions (also known as Levitan Productions) is an American television production company founded in 1994 by television producer and writer Steven Levitan. The company is best known for producing comedy series, such as Just Shoot Me!, Greg the Bunny, Oliver Beene and Modern Family.

== History ==
Steven Levitan Productions was founded in 1994 in Beverly Hills, California by American television producer, director, and screenwriter Steven Levitan. In July 2006, Levitan co-partnered with Christopher Lloyd to set up Lloyd-Levitan Productions at 20th Century Fox.

In March 2014, the company entered a four-year overall deal with 20th Century Fox Television. In September 2019, the company entered a five-year overall deal with 20th Television.

== Filmography ==
Year	Title	Network	Notes	Ref.
1997–2003	Just Shoot Me!	NBC	with Brillstein-Grey Communications and Columbia Pictures Television	
1999–2000	Stark Raving Mad	NBC	with 20th Century Fox Television	
2002	Greg the Bunny	Fox/IFC	with 20th Century Fox Television	
2003–2004	Oliver Beene	Fox	with (ge.wirtz) Films, DreamWorks Television, and 20th Century Fox Television	
2005–2006	Stacked	Fox	with 20th Century Fox Television	
2009–2020	Modern Family	ABC	with Picador Productions and 20th Century Fox Television	
2018	LA to Vegas	Fox	with Briskets Big Yellow House, Gary Sanchez Productions, and 20th Century Fox Television	
2022	Reboot	Hulu	with 20th Television	
2024–present	Nobody Wants This	Netflix	with Fatigue Sisters Productions, Mr. D Productions, 3 Arts Entertainment, Dunshire Productions and 20th Television	

=== In development ===
- Do You Want Kids? (with 20th Television)
