= Great Hymn of Thanksgiving =

Musical Composition

Great Hymn of Thanksgiving is a 2003 performance piece, scored for three speaking percussionists, composed by playwright and composer Rick Burkhardt. It has been performed by The Nonsense Company, Ensemble Chronophonie, line upon line, thingNY, and several other contemporary music ensembles.

The Nonsense Company's performance of the piece is often paired with Conversation Storm, a short play written by Burkhardt.

== Summary ==
According to the composer's program note, Great Hymn of Thanksgiving takes place at a dinner table, where the sounds of conversation have been replaced by fragments of news reports from Iraq, scraps from the Army prayer manual, invented Arab folk tales, and a recurring State of Emergency pointing everywhere and leading nowhere. The sounds of the table itself struggle to bring this “conversation” into a confrontation with material reality.

The piece is a trio between the functions of music, noise, and semantic meaning, wherein each function can mingle with the others, lose itself in reveries (under fields of motive force that assert themselves with varying degrees of insistence), or, when necessary, take a solo.

== Film ==
In 2007, filmmaker H.P. Mendoza was working for the San Francisco Fringe Festival and was able to see a performance of The Nonsense Company's Great Hymn of Thanksgiving/Conversation Storm and was determined to meet the troupe. In 2008, Mendoza gave his voice to Great Hymn playwright Rick Burkhardt for his award-winning composition "Calf", performed by the ensemble Ascolta and decided to ask Burkhardt if he would be interested in making a film version of Great Hymn of Thanksgiving/Conversation Storm, called "a delicious two-course evening" by Time Out New York.

The film is slated for release in 2015.

== Cast (three speaking percussionists) ==
- Rick Burkhardt
- Andy Gricevich
- Ryan Higgins

== Awards ==
- 2007 San Francisco Fringe Festival - Best New Play
- 2008 NYC Frigid Fest - Best of Fest
- 2008 NYC Frigid Fest - Audience Choice
