= Milwaukee LGBT Film & Video Festival =

LGBTQ film festival in Wisconsin, U.S.

- Location: Milwaukee, Wisconsin, U.S.
- Established: 1983
- Disestablished: 2019

The Milwaukee LGBT Film & Video Festival was a film festival that took place every fall in Milwaukee, Wisconsin. The festival was established in 1987 and was presented by the Film Department (now the Film, Video, Animation & New Genres department) in the Peck School of the Arts of the University of Wisconsin–Milwaukee (UWM). Opening night and centerpiece gala screenings took place at the Oriental Theatre located on the East Side of Milwaukee. In 2018 the format of the festival changed to provide screenings throughout the year instead of the concentrated 11-day format primarily screened at the UW Milwaukee Union Theatre.

Programming included films and independent videos; the festival also booked documentaries, coming out films, romantic comedies, films dealing with LGBT identity with age, race, and religion, and films from outside the United States. Each festival also included series of "men's shorts" and "women's shorts" that include gay and lesbian themes, respectively.

Festival sponsorship came from a variety of corporate and private donors.

Due to the rise in popularity of other local film festivals and the COVID-19 pandemic, the last festival was held in 2019.

== History ==
=== Founding ===
The earliest record of the film festival can be found in the first ever issue of InStep Magazine (February 9-22, 1984), where the author mentioned attending the "Second Annual Milwaukee Gay/Lesbian Film Festival". At the time, the festival was sponsored by the Lavender Commitment. By 1992, Great Lakes Film and Video replaced the Lavender Commitment as the festival's sponsor.

=== Later years ===
Throughout most of the festival's history, the event was directed by Carl Bogner, University of Wisconsin–Milwaukee's lecturer. Although labeled as an annual event, it is unclear whether or not this is true. Archives show that the festival's 20th anniversary was held in 2007 while its 30th was held in 2015.

=== Extinction ===
Entering the 2010s, the festival saw a rise in competition. Namely, the Milwaukee International Film Festival (now Milwaukee Film Festival). With its broader range of movie genres featured, the festival naturally drew in a larger crowd. In 2018, the Milwaukee Film Festival added a GenreQueer category, drawing LGBTQ+ filmmakers and sponsors away from the Milwaukee LGBT Film & Video Festival. Facing a decline in attendance, in addition to the COVID-19 pandemic, the festival quietly shut down after its 2019 iteration.

== Past festival highlights ==
2005
Adam & Steve, Loggerheads, Unveiled, The Journey, Mysterious Skin, Guys and Balls, 100% Woman, Summer Storm, Cote D'Azur

2006
Boy Culture, Broken Sky, Small Town Gay Bar, Oublier Cheyenne, The Line of Beauty, The Blossoming of Maximo Oliveros, Lover Other, Red Doors, Another Gay Movie, Camp Out, Filthy Gorgeous: The Trannyshack Story, 20 centímetros

2007
Nina's Heavenly Delights, Shelter, FtF: Female to Femme, The Bubble, Beyond Hatred, For the Bible Tells Me So, Colma: The Musical, Itty Bitty Titty Committee

2008
Were the World Mine, It Is Not the Homosexual Who Is Perverse, But the Society in Which He Lives, La León, Butch Jamie, Save Me, The Lollipop Generation, A Horse Is Not A Metaphor, XXY, A Jihad for Love, Water Lilies, Jerusalem Is Proud to Present, The World Unseen, Saturn in Opposition, Chris & Don: A Love Story, Japan Japan

2009
Patrik, Age 1.5, An Englishman in New York, Prodicgal Sons, We Are the Mods, Straightlaced, Hannah Free, Rivers Wash Over Me, Still Black: A Portrait of Black Transmen, Fig Trees, Training Rules, Lady Trojans, Every Time I See Your Picture I Cry, To Die Like a Man, Andy Warhol's Fifteen Minutes 1985-1987, Fruit Fly, And Then Came Lola, Diagnosing Difference, Travel Queeries, Edie & Thea: A Very Long Engagement, Hollywood, Je T'aime, Factory Diaries Featuring Brigid Polk, Off and Running: An American Coming of Age Story, Word is Out

== See also ==
- List of LGBT events
- List of LGBT film festivals
