= Conversation Storm =

2006 play by Rick Burkhardt

Conversation Storm is a 2006 play written by playwright and composer Rick Burkhardt and originally performed by The Nonsense Company.

The performance is often paired with Great Hymn of Thanksgiving, another piece written by Burkhardt.

== Summary ==
Three friends from three sides of the political spectrum unwillingly argue their way through a "ticking time bomb" scenario, dissecting, revising, and even brutalizing their own positions in the process — but time has either stopped or entered an ugly loop, and as the friends assign and reassign roles, the scenario begins to dissolve the boundaries between real and hypothetical, past and future, day and night.

== Film ==
In 2007, filmmaker H.P. Mendoza was working for the San Francisco Fringe Festival and was able to see a performance of The Nonsense Company's Great Hymn of Thanksgiving/Conversation Storm and was determined to meet the troupe. In 2008, Mendoza gave his voice to Great Hymn playwright Rick Burkhardt for his award-winning composition "Calf", performed by the ensemble Ascolta and decided to ask Burkhardt if he would be interested in making a film version of Great Hymn of Thanksgiving/Conversation Storm, called "a delicious two-course evening" by Time Out New York.

The film is slated for release in 2015.

Conversation Storm was published in Plays and Playwrights 2009, edited by Martin Denton.

== Cast ==
- Rick Burkhardt
- Andy Gricevich
- Ryan Higgins

== Awards ==
- 2007 San Francisco Fringe Festival – Best New Play
- 2008 NYC Frigid Fest – Best of Fest
- 2008 NYC Frigid Fest – Audience Choice
