= DreamWorks Television =

American television company and DreamWorks Pictures subsidiary

- Type: Division
- Industry: Television production Television syndication
- Predecessor: Geffen Television
- Founded: December 1994; 31 years ago
- Founders: Steven Spielberg; Jeffrey Katzenberg; David Geffen
- Defunct: September 6, 2013; 13 years ago
- Fate: Folded into Amblin Television
- Successors: Amblin Television (live action counterpart); DreamWorks Animation Television (animated counterpart)
- Headquarters: Universal City, California, United States
- Parent: DreamWorks Pictures
- Divisions: DreamWorks International Television; DreamWorks Television Animation (1996–1999)

DreamWorks Television was an American television distribution and production company based in Universal City, California, that was a division of DreamWorks. The company was active from December 1994 to September 6, 2013, when it was folded into Amblin Television.

== History ==
DreamWorks Television was formed in December 1994 as DreamWorks Pictures agreed to a $200 million seven-year television production joint venture with the Capital Cities/ABC. The company was set up to produce series for broadcast networks, cable channels and first run syndication with no first look for ABC, but financial incentives favored ABC. The first show, Champs, was scheduled as a mid-season replacement for ABC. Dan McDermott was named division chief executive in June 1995. DreamWorks Television's first success was Spin City on ABC. The Walt Disney Company bought Capital Cities/ABC in February 1996.

In 1997, DreamWorks Television had a falling-out with NBC over the development of various television shows. The dispute was eventually settled, and went to being a development slated for NBC in 1998. In 1998, DreamWorks struck a deal with Paramount Domestic Television to syndicate Spin City for off-net syndication.

In 2002, the company's joint venture agreement with ABC ended. This agreement was replaced by a development agreement with NBC with a first look clause, financing for series pickups by the network while taking a financial stake in the show. DreamWorks Television could finance shows sold to other outlets, and NBC paid an annual fee to it.

In December 2005, it was announced that Paramount Pictures' parent company Viacom was purchasing DreamWorks' live-action film and television divisions, with the $1.6 billion deal being finalized at the beginning of February 2006. The deal also included a six-year distribution agreement with DreamWorks Animation, which split into its own separate company in October 2004. DreamWorks' live-action film and television divisions briefly operated as labels of Paramount, before becoming independent entities again in late 2008.

== TV shows ==
Much of the pre-2008 DreamWorks Television catalogue is currently owned and distributed worldwide by Paramount Global Content Distribution with the exception of the programs Line of Fire, Carpoolers and Oliver Beene (distributed by Disney–ABC Home Entertainment and Television Distribution), Las Vegas (distributed in North America by NBCUniversal Syndication Studios and internationally by MGM Worldwide Television Distribution), Father of the Pride (distributed by NBCUniversal Syndication Studios via DreamWorks Animation), Off Centre (distributed by Warner Bros. Television), Band of Brothers (distributed by HBO Enterprises), Miracle Workers (distributed by Lionsgate Television), and Rescue Me (distributed by Sony Pictures Television); Paramount also co-distributes The Job (with Disney–ABC Home Entertainment and Television Distribution), Boomtown (with NBCUniversal Syndication Studios in North America and MGM Worldwide Television Distribution outside North America) and Alienators: Evolution Continues (North American joint distribution with WildBrain; international joint distribution to the series has been held by Sony Pictures Television and WildBrain).

=== TV series produced by DreamWorks Television ===
==== 1990s ====
Title	Years	Network	Notes
Champs	1996	ABC	Co-production with Ubu Productions; DreamWorks' first television series
High Incident	1996–1997	ABC	Co-production with Johnson/Pavone Productions (season 1), Nothing But Net, Inc. (season 1) and Downwell Productions (season 2)
Majority Rules	1996–1997	KPNX	
Ink	1996–1997	CBS	Co-production with Shukovsky English Entertainment and Addis/Weischer Television
Arsenio	1997	ABC	Co-production with David Rosenthal Productions and Arsenio Hall Communications
Toonsylvania	1998–1999	Fox Kids	Produced by DreamWorks Television Animation
Invasion America	1998	The WB	Produced by DreamWorks Television Animation
It's Like, You Know...	1999–2000	ABC	Co-production with 42 Pound Productions and EWH3 Productions
Freaks and Geeks	1999–2000	NBC	Co-production with Apatow Productions

==== 2000s ====
Title	Years	Network	Notes
The Others	2000	NBC	Co-production with Delusional Films and NBC Studios
Battery Park	2000	NBC	Co-production with Ubu Productions
The Job	2001–2002	ABC	Co-production with The Cloudland Company, Apostle and Touchstone Television
Band of Brothers	2001	HBO	Miniseries; co-production with Playtone, HBO Entertainment and British Broadcasting Corporation
Alienators: Evolution Continues	2001–2002	Fox Kids	US co-production with The Montecito Picture Company, DIC Entertainment and Dentsu; Produced outside the US by Columbia TriStar Television; Based on the 2001 film Evolution by DreamWorks Pictures and Columbia Pictures
Undeclared	2001–2002	Fox	Co-production with Apatow Productions
Off Centre	2001–2002	The WB	Co-production with Weitz, Weitz & Zuker and Warner Bros. Television
Boomtown	2002–2003	NBC	Co-production with Nemo Films and NBC Studios
Taken	2002	Sci-Fi Channel	Miniseries
Oliver Beene	2003–2004	Fox	Co-production with Steven Levitan Productions, ge.wirtz Films and 20th Century Fox Television
Las Vegas	2003–2008	NBC	Co-production with Gary Scott Thompson Productions, NBC Studios (season 1), NBC Universal Television Studio (seasons 2–5) and Universal Media Studios (season 5)
Line of Fire	2003–2004	ABC	Co-production with Battle Plan Productions and Touchstone Television
Rescue Me	2004–2011	FX	Co-production with The Cloudland Company, Apostle and Sony Pictures Television
Father of the Pride	2004–2005	NBC	Produced by DreamWorks Animation
The Contender	2005–2008	NBC (season 1) / ESPN (seasons 2–3) / Versus (season 4)	Co-production with Mark Burnett Productions and ESPN Original Entertainment (seasons 2–3)
Into the West	2005	TNT	Miniseries; co-production with Voice Pictures
Miracle Workers	2006	ABC	Co-production with Renegade 83
Dog Bites Man	2006	Comedy Central	
On the Lot	2007	Fox	Co-production with Mark Burnett Productions and Amblin Television
Carpoolers	2007–2008	ABC	Co-production with T.R.O.N.T., 3 Arts Entertainment and ABC Studios
United States of Tara	2009–2011	Showtime	Co-production with Showtime Networks
Wedding Day	2009	TNT	Co-production with Mark Burnett Productions

==== 2010s ====
Title	Years	Network	Notes
The Pacific	2010	HBO	Miniseries; co-production with Playtone and HBO Entertainment
Falling Skies	2011–2013	TNT	Seasons 1–3 only; seasons 4–5 produced by Amblin Television
Rising: Rebuilding Ground Zero	2011	Discovery Channel	Miniseries; co-production with KPI Productions
Smash	2012–2013	NBC	co-production with Madwoman in the Attic, Inc. (season 1) and Universal Television
The Americans	2013	FX	Pilot; co-production with Fox Television Studios and FX Productions

=== TV specials produced by DreamWorks Television ===
- Dear Diary (1996; unsold television pilot)
- The Secret World of Antz (1998)
- When You Believe: Music From "The Prince of Egypt" (1998)
- Galaxy Quest: 20th Anniversary — The Journey Continues (1999)
- The Hatching of "Chicken Run" (2000)
- Gladiator Games: The Roman Bloodsport (2000)
- We Stand Alone Together (2001)
- What Lies Beneath: Constructing the Perfect Thriller (2001)
- Woody Allen: A Life in Film (2002)

=== TV series produced by DreamWorks Animation ===
These are television series produced by DreamWorks Animation (DWA) that were distributed by DreamWorks Television around the world. In 2004, the animation division of DreamWorks was spun off as a separate company (and now bought by NBCUniversal in 2016) and thus animated shows from after 2004 do not apply here.

- Toonsylvania (1998–1999)
- Invasion America (1998)
- Father of the Pride (2004–2005)
