= All You Need Is Blood (film) =

- Official poster
- Directed by: Cooper Roberts
- Written by: Cooper Roberts
- Produced by: Jordan Yale Levine; Jordan Beckerman; Jesse Korman; Russell Posternak
- Starring: Logan Riley Bruner; Mena Suvari; Eddie Griffin
- Cinematography: Jackson Jarvis
- Edited by: Cooper Roberts
- Production companies: Yale Productions; Post Film
- Distributed by: Level 33 Entertainment
- Release dates: 2023 (Sitges); October 25, 2024 (United States)
- Running time: 100 minutes
- Country: United States
- Language: English

All You Need Is Blood is a 2023 American comedy horror film written, edited and directed by Cooper Roberts and starring Mena Suvari, Eddie Griffin and Logan Riley Bruner. The film follows 16-year-old Bucky, an aspiring teen filmmaker who casts the perfect lead for his breakout zombie film: his undead dad. It also took place in 1998.

== Cast ==
- Logan Riley Bruner as Bucky Le Boeuf, a 16-year-old aspiring director looking to make the next arthouse masterpiece.
- Mena Suvari as Vivian Vance, a washed up actress with a sense of style as tacky as a mobster's wife, the star of Bucky's film.
- Eddie Griffin as Detective Moses T. Swan, smart as a fox with a heavy religious attitude.
- Emma Chasse as June Roberts, a goth teen with intense stage fright, she joins Bucky's production as exposure therapy for her fear of cameras.
- Neel Sethi as Vishnu Gudi, Bucky's loyal partner in crime.
- Tom O'Keefe as Walter Le Boeuf, Bucky's alcoholic emotionally-unavailable father who turns into a zombie.

== Production ==
In January 2023, it was announced that filming wrapped in New Jersey.

== Release ==
The film premiered at the 2023 Sitges Film Festival.

The film had its virtual premiere on the Kino App on October 12, 2024, before getting a limited theatrical and VOD release on October 25, 2024.

== Reception ==
In his review on Film Threat, Terry Sherwood rated it with a score of 8/10 saying that the film has "lots of spraying blood, action, and wisecracking dialogue."

== See also ==
- List of horror films of 2023
