= The Secret Art of Human Flight =

- Theatrical release poster
- Directed by: H.P. Mendoza
- Written by: Jesse Orenshein
- Produced by: Grant Rosenmeyer; Tina Carbone; Benjamin Wiessner
- Starring: Grant Rosenmeyer
- Cinematography: Markus Mentzer
- Edited by: H.P. Mendoza
- Music by: H.P. Mendoza
- Production companies: Florida Hill; Vanishing Angle; Ersatz; City Hill Arts; Chicago Media Angels; XYZ Films
- Distributed by: Level 33 Entertainment
- Release dates: June 8, 2023 (Tribeca); July 3, 2024 (United States)
- Running time: 107 minutes
- Country: United States
- Language: English

The Secret Art of Human Flight is a 2023 American fantasy comedy drama film written by Jesse Orenshein, directed by H.P. Mendoza and starring Grant Rosenmeyer.

== Plot ==
After the sudden death of his wife, author Ben Grady falls into deep grief and ends contact with his sister Gloria and her husband Tom. While the widower is on the darknet, he discovers a mysterious self-help book written by an enigmatic guru named "Mealworm" who claims to have acquired the ability to fly. Ben wants to learn this too.

== Cast ==
- Grant Rosenmeyer as Ben Grady
- Paul Raci as Mealworm
- Lucy DeVito as Gloria
- Nican Robinson as Tom
- Reina Hardesty as Sarah
- Rosa Arredondo as Detective Reyes
- Maggie Grace as Wendy
- Sendhil Ramamurthy as Roger

== Release ==
The Secret Art of Human Flight premiered at the Tribeca Festival on June 8, 2023. In March 2024, Level 33 Entertainment acquired the distribution rights to the film and was released in theaters on July 3, 2024.

The film was one of the first to experiment with "digital live premieres" with KINO, and was released on home video and streaming services on December 19, 2024.

== Critical reception ==
The film has a 97% rating on Rotten Tomatoes based on 29 reviews.

Benjamin Franz of Film Threat called the film "…a staggering, poignant, graceful work of genius..." deeming it "the single most life affirming story you shall experience this year".

Peter Debruge of Variety also gave the film a positive review and wrote, "This high-concept, lo-fi indie drama could have gone spiraling off into insufferably eccentric territory, but instead remains grounded in its focus on a young creative type coping with the loss of his soulmate."

Matt Zoller Seitz of RogerEbert.com gave the film a 50/50 review and wrote, "Writer Jesse Orenstein and director H.P. Mendoza are good at poker-faced goofiness, and there's a characteristically excellent supporting performance by Sound of Metal star Paul Raci..." but also states "which is not the same thing as saying that it’s a great movie—it’s okay and sometimes better than that."

=== Best of Lists ===
- Best Films of 2024 - Hammer to Nail
- Top 10 Films of 2024 - True West
- Top 20 Indie Movies of 2024 - Film-Authority
- Top 10 Movies of 2024 - Watch or Pass

== Awards & Nominations ==
Award	Year	Category	Recipient	Result	Ref.
Eastern Oregon Film Festival	2023	Best Feature Narrative	H.P. Mendoza	Won	
Ouray International Film Festival	2023	Best Director	H.P. Mendoza	Won	
Coronado Island Film Festival	2023	Audience Choice Award Best Film	H.P. Mendoza	Won	
Tribeca Film Festival	2023	Best U.S. Narrative Feature	H.P. Mendoza	Nominated	
San Francisco Bay Area Film Critics Circle	2023	The Marlon Riggs Award	H.P. Mendoza	Won	
San Francisco Bay Area Film Critics Circle	2024	Special Citation for Independent Cinema	H.P. Mendoza	Nominated	
