= Patrick Epino =

American filmmaker

- Born: Patrick Epino; San Francisco, California
- Occupation: Filmmaker
- Years active: 2000 — present
- Website: www.patrickepino.com

Patrick Epino is an American filmmaker from San Francisco.

== Career ==
His feature film Mr. Sadman made for the Independent Feature Project (IFP) Independent Filmmaker Labs is a satirical dark comedy about a Sadam Hussein body-double loses his job and moves to Los Angeles in search of a new start. It stars Al No'mani, Scoot McNairy, Rudy Ramos, Tim Kang, Amanda Fuller, and Cameron Bender and has received positive reviews from LA Weekly, Giant Robot Magazine and more, and Epino was also selected by the film magazine The Independent as one of its "10 Filmmakers to Watch" for that film. Along with Stephen Dypiangco he makes up the "National Film Society" which is part of PBS and makes original web content related to films, filmmaking and film festivals that is viewable online.

Other than Mr. Sadman, Epino has directed a short film entitled "Void" under a Visual Communications "Armed With A Camera" Fellowship for Emerging Media Artists which premiered at the Los Angeles Asian Pacific Film Festival. He has directed and written another short film entitled "Spunk" which appeared at a number of film festivals, including SingaFest. He has also served as a Producer on the short film, A Crossroad Called Manzanar.

Epino's most recent film, which he co-wrote and co-directed with Stephen Dypiangco, is Awesome Asian Bad Guys, which stars a number of Asian American actors who played villains in 1980-1990s action movies, such as Al Leong, Yuji Okumoto and George Cheung. The film/series also stars Tamlyn Tomita, Dante Basco, Randall Park, Aaron Takahashi and more. The film/series made its debut at the 2014 CAAMFest and also made its Los Angeles premiere at the 2014 Los Angeles Asian Pacific Film Festival.

As an actor, he played the role of "Troy" in H.P. Mendoza's award-winning dark comedy film Bitter Melon. Produced by ABS-CBN's Cinematografo initiative, the film placed on over a dozen "Best of" lists before being distributed on Special Edition Blu-ray, DVD, and Digital HD via Gravitas Ventures on October 1, 2019.

Epino is the producer of Long Distance, a documentary podcast and video series about stories in the Filipino diaspora, created and hosted by Paola Mardo. The show has landed on numerous "Top 10" lists and was an inaugural member of the Google Podcasts Creator Program. He is also the host of the Oakland Warriors Podcast, a sports entertainment podcast focusing on all things Golden State Warriors and the NBA. The show is produced by National Film Society and is a part of The Basketball Podcast Network.

Epino is a graduate of the University of Chicago and earned his MFA in Cinema from the film program at San Francisco State University. He is also from San Francisco, California and is of Filipino American descent.

== Filmography ==
- Bitter Melon (2018) - Actor: "Troy"
- Awesome Asian Bad Guys (2014) - Writer, Director (with Stephen Dypiangco)
- Mr. Sadman (2009) - Writer, Director
- Void (2005) - Writer, Director
- Spunk (2004) - Writer, Director
