= Longhorns (2011 film) =

- Directed by: David Lewis
- Written by: David Lewis
- Produced by: Lewis Tice
- Starring: Jacob Newton; Derek Efrain Villanueva; Dylan Vox
- Cinematography: Frazer Bradshaw
- Edited by: H.P. Mendoza
- Music by: H.P. Mendoza
- Production company: Morning View Films
- Distributed by: TLA Releasing
- Release date: June 25, 2011
- Running time: 75 minutes
- Country: United States
- Language: English

Longhorns is a 2011 American sex comedy film written and directed by David Lewis. Set in 1982, the plot centers around a Texas University student who whilst curious about the male sexual fantasies he has been having, decides he needs to hook up with an out gay student on campus.

== Plot Synopsis ==
Set in 1982, Longhorns centers around Texan college student Kevin (Jacob Newton). He’s a red-blooded, all-American, heterosexual male. At least, he really wants to prove to himself that he’s heterosexual. It becomes harder for him to maintain that ruse when he meets a new student, Cesar (Derek Villanueva), who is openly gay. Kevin finds himself drawn to Cesar, and one day, after asking if he can draw Cesar nude for a class assignment they begin to make out. Kevin freaks out and tells Cesar to leave. To get away from his confusing feelings, Kevin escapes for the weekend with his buds Steve (Dylan Vox) and Danny (Stephen Matzke) to a log cabin. The weekend is going to be especially frisky, as Steve has promised that when his insatiable girlfriend Brenda (Katrina Sherwood) and her best friends arrive, they will be ready to "go all the way," making the cabin the ultimate sex hot spot. But a heavy rainstorm descends, causing the roads to flood away, preventing the girls from getting up to the cabin. With no women around and an endless supply of beers and porno movies cluttering up the VCR, the guys decide to lend each other a "hand." But Kevin's confusion and denial continue to escalate and something has got to give because his head says one thing but his heart feels something completely different!

== Cast ==
- Jacob Newton as Kevin
- Derek Villanueva as Cesar
- Dylan Vox as Steve
- Kevin Held as Justin
- Stephen Matzke as Danny
- Bonnie Marion as Marsha
- Katrina Sherwood as Brenda
- Sophia Revelli as Camille

== Production ==
=== Casting ===
Director and writer, David Lewis met Derek Villanueva in 2010 at Frameline where Villanueva was promoting his film Little Love. Producer Lewis Tice had suggested the meeting and after meeting with Villanueva and having him read the part for Cesar, Lewis offered him the role.

Jacob Newton had originally been interested in the supporting role of Justin, a homophobic classmate who also has some repressed same-sex attractions. But when it came time to audition, he was asked to read for Kevin.

=== Filming ===
Filming of Longhorns took place over a schedule of eleven days the film was shot mainly in Northern California with shooting taking place in Grass Valley and the Sierra Foothills AVA.

== Release ==
Longhorns premiered on June 25, 2011, at the Castro Theatre, San Francisco, as part of Frameline 35, the San Francisco International LGBT Film Festival.

=== Home media ===
The film was released on DVD on 21 November 2011 and on Blu-ray on 16 January 2017.

== Critical reception ==
Critic Dennis Harvey of Variety reviewed the film favorably saying "The third time's the charm for writer-director David Lewis, whose first two gay-themed features were earnest but undercooked dramas."

On review aggregator Rotten Tomatoes, Longhorns holds an audience approval rating of 39% based on 100+ reviews.
