= Oliver Beene =

American television sitcom (2003–2004)

- Genre: Sitcom
- Created by: Howard Gewirtz
- Starring: Grant Rosenmeyer; Grant Shaud; Wendy Makkena; Andrew Lawrence; Daveigh Chase; Taylor Emerson
- Narrated by: David Cross
- Opening theme: "The Future Is Now" by The Solids
- Composer: Paul Buckley
- Country of origin: United States
- Original language: English
- No. of seasons: 2
- No. of episodes: 24

Production
- Camera setup: Single-camera
- Running time: 21 minutes
- Production companies: Steven Levitan Productions; Gewirtz Films; DreamWorks Television (season 1); 20th Century Fox Television

Original release
- Network: Fox
- Release: March 9, 2003 – September 12, 2004

Oliver Beene is an American sitcom that was produced by Steven Levitan Productions, Gewirtz Films, DreamWorks Television and 20th Century Fox Television and aired on Fox from March 9, 2003 to September 12, 2004. The show was created by Howard Gewirtz. Set in 1962 and 1963, the show chronicled the trials and tribulations of the 11-to-12-year-old Oliver Beene (played by Grant Rosenmeyer), in first person perspective. Oliver Beene's other main characters are his parents Jerry and Charlotte Beene, his older brother Ted Beene, and his two friends Joyce and Michael. The narrator, an older Oliver reflecting on his experience, is voiced by David Cross. Often in episodes, the story is interrupted by flashbacks and flashforwards.

== Premise ==
Oliver (born c. 1951), attempts to sustain normality in an often unpredictable family. Oliver's father Jerry spends his days drilling teeth as a dentist, while his mother attempts to play the traditional homemaker. Oliver's older brother, Ted is a sports nut and a womanizer. Oliver's life is often made more bearable with friends Michael, Joyce and his crush Bonnie, who appears at his most embarrassing moments. In the second season, both brothers have a crush on a Swedish girl, Elke, who moved into their apartment building.

== Cast ==
=== Main ===
- Grant Rosenmeyer as Oliver Beene
  - David Cross as future Oliver Beene (voice only)
- Grant Shaud as Dr. Jerry Beene
- Wendy Makkena as Charlotte Beene
- Andrew Lawrence as Ted Beene
- Daveigh Chase as Joyce
- Taylor Emerson as Michael

=== Recurring ===
- Maggie Grace as Elke
- Amanda Michalka as Bonnie
- Amy Bruckner as Susan

== Broadcast history ==
Season	Time
2002–03	Sunday at 8:30 (Episodes 1–6); Sunday at 9:30 (Episodes 7 & 8)
2003–04	Wednesday at 9:30 (Episode 1); Sunday at 7:30 (Episodes 2–6); Sunday at 7:00 (Episodes 7–14)

== Episodes ==
The series first aired on March 9, 2003, as a Fox program to replace the animated series Futurama. The first season was relatively successful, and the show was brought back for a second season. However, poor ratings throughout the second season led to the show's cancellation in September 2004, with the two last episodes of the season being left unaired in America. (the last episode to air in the show's original timeslot was broadcast on September 12, 2004). In the UK and Ireland, Sky One broadcast both seasons, in their entirety. In Germany, Das Erste HD twice broadcast both seasons in their entirety, dubbed in German: once in 2006 and again in 2010. In the Czech Republic, ČT1 broadcast both seasons in their entirety, dubbed in Czech.

Season	Episodes	Originally released	
Season	Episodes	First released	Last released
1	8	March 9, 2003	May 4, 2003
2	16	February 4, 2004	September 12, 2004

=== Season 1 (2003) ===
No. overall	No. in season	Title	Directed by	Written by	Original release date	Prod. code	U.S. viewers (millions)
1	1	"A Day at the Beach"	Michael Spiller	Story by : Eric Abrams & Matthew Berry; Teleplay by : Howard Gewirtz	March 9, 2003	1AGS02	13.79
The Beenes hope to join a popular country club, while Oliver has a crush on a girl named Bonnie.
2	2	"Home, a Loan"	Jeff Melman	Bill Callahan & Philip Wen	March 16, 2003	1AGS05	10.97
Jerry and Charlotte visit Jerry's old college friend Mitch (Kurt Fuller), while Ted's friend Harvey (A. J. Trauth) gets him and Oliver in trouble with a creepy neighbor.
3	3	"Space Race"	Michael Spiller	Steven Levitan	March 30, 2003	1AGS04	10.19
Oliver finds himself in trouble after accidentally hurting a new black student at school.
4	4	"The Nudie Mag"	Jeff Melman	Carter Bays & Craig Thomas	April 6, 2003	1AGS03	8.32
Oliver may get in big trouble when he and Michael go looking for something in Michael's closet and find a magazine belong to Michael's father.
5	5	"Lord of the Bees"	Matt Shakman	Chris Harris	April 13, 2003	1AGS10	9.37
Oliver cheats on a test to get a better score than Susan (Amy Bruckner).
6	6	"Dancing Beene"	Jeff Melman	Carter Bays & Craig Thomas	April 20, 2003	1AGS08	6.80
Oliver has a dream to become like Fred Astaire, so he takes a ballroom class. He later learns he can't dance at all.
7	7	"Divorce-O-Rama"	Jeff Melman	Jace Richdale	April 27, 2003	1AGS01	7.87
Oliver and Joyce try to get tickets to a TV show. Meanwhile, Oliver thinks his parents are getting a divorce after learning that Joyce's parents are headed for divorce.
8	8	"Oliver's Best Friend"	Lev L. Spiro	Jim Bernstein & Michael Shipley	May 4, 2003	1AGS09	9.25
After convincing his parents to get him a dog, Oliver learns that having a dog is more trouble than he can handle.

=== Season 2 (2004) ===
No. overall	No. in season	Title	Directed by	Written by	Original release date	Prod. code	U.S. viewers (millions)
9	1	"Dibs"	Lev L. Spiro	Howard Gewirtz & Steven Levitan	February 4, 2004	2AGS02	10.62
Oliver and Ted have a crush on the new girl in the neighborhood named Elke (Maggie Grace). Meanwhile, Jerry and Charlotte try to get into an old club, unaware that it's all about jazz and marijuana.
10	2	"Soup to Nuts"	Lev L. Spiro	Chris Harris	February 8, 2004	2AGS05	5.88
On a school field trip, Oliver spills his lunch on his lap when the bus hits a bump in the road, and everyone thinks he's thrown up on himself.
11	3	"Daughter for a Day"	Lev L. Spiro	Jim Bernstein & Howard Gewirtz & Michael Shipley	February 15, 2004	2AGS08	4.78
Oliver and Jerry do some father-and-son bonding for the day, while Charlotte feels left out and spends the day with Joyce, hoping to get to know her better.
12	4	"X-Ray Specs"	Michael Spiller	Carter Bays & Craig Thomas	February 22, 2004	2AGS07	6.39
Oliver orders X-ray glasses from a comic book and finds out they don't work. He decides to get revenge on the company owner, Barnaby Rollins (Richard Kind), to get his money back.
13	5	"Ward Have Mercy"	Matt Shakman	David M. Stern	March 7, 2004	2AGS03	6.07
Oliver creates a door knocker that Mr. Stitt (Ethan Phillips) does not approve of and tells him to remove. Charlotte gets advice from the building superintendent, Carl (Kenneth Mars), on how to beat Mr. Stitt in the upcoming election.
14	6	"Disposa Boy"	Brent Carpenter	Kristofor Brown	March 14, 2004	1AGS06	5.24
Oliver learns that he is going to the lowest level of the grade levels in his school because his former teacher Mrs. Heller punished him. So, Oliver tries to figure out how to get back to level one without taking the Iowa test. Meanwhile, Jerry tries to get people interested in his latest invention, the "Disposa Toothbrush." Note: This episode was originally produced for season 1.
15	7	"Idol Chatter"	Matt Shakman	Stephen Lloyd	June 6, 2004	2AGS06	2.67
Jerry tries to outdo his neighbors the O'Shaughnessys by having a famous comedian entertaining the guests at the Beene party.
16	8	"Oliver and the Otters"	Michael Spiller	Carter Bays & Craig Thomas	June 13, 2004	2AGS09	3.33
Oliver forms his own band called "Oliver and the Otters" to impress Bonnie. Meanwhile, Jerry asks Charlotte to fill in as his dental assistant after his previous one gets hurt.
17	9	"Kissing Babies"	Jay Chandrasekhar	Jim Bernstein & Michael Shipley	June 20, 2004	2AGS04	2.24
Oliver is about to attend his first make-out party and seeks advice from Ted about the games that will be played there.
18	10	"Girly Dad"	Marcos Siega	Jace Richdale	June 27, 2004	1AGS07	N/A
Charlotte and Ted try to teach Jerry how to throw a ball in a more manly fashion. Note: Originally produced for season 1, this episode was seen only on West Coast stations as the 7:00 timeslot was pre-empted by NASCAR coverage on Fox.
19	11	"Fallout"	Jeff Melman	Howard Gewirtz	August 15, 2004	1AGS79	2.35
Hoping to impress Bonnie, Oliver tries out for the annual talent show. Meanwhile, Jerry turns the basement into a fallout shelter as an anniversary present for Charlotte. Note: This was the series pilot.
20	12	"Catskills"	Michael Spiller	Jim Bernstein & Michael Shipley	August 22, 2004	2AGS13	2.40
Charlotte is desperate for some time with her family, so she decides to take her family to the Catskills Mountains.
21	13	"A Trip to Coney Island"	Jeff Melman	Carter Bays & Craig Thomas	August 29, 2004	2AGS01	2.89
Jerry and his family decide to take a trip to Coney Island. The vacation sparks a feud between Jerry and his neighbor over a parking spot. Meanwhile, Oliver gets his dream job of being a paperboy but soon realizes that it's not all it's cracked up to be.
22	14	"Babysitting"	Howard Gewirtz	Brenda Hsueh	September 12, 2004	2AGS11	N/A
Oliver is conned into baby-sitting for Joyce, but she gets more than she bargained for when Oliver steals her steady job. Note: This episode was seen only on West Coast stations as the 7:00 timeslot was pre-empted by NFL coverage on Fox.
23	15	"Superhero"	Joe Pennella	David M. Stern & Chris Harris	Unaired	2AGS10	N/A
Oliver can never seem to take a good photo and therefore hates picture day. Determined to take control of the situation on his terms, he wears a superhero costume in protest. Meanwhile, Ted learns that his baseball coach is dating Elke.
24	16	"The King & I"	Fred Savage	Stephen Lloyd	Unaired	2AGS12	N/A
The owner of a sports store offers Ted all that he wants from the store. But to get it, he must go out with the owner's daughter.
