= Isabelle de Hertogh =

Belgian actress

- Born: 1972 (age 53–54); Belgium
- Occupation: Actress
- Years active: 1995–present

Isabelle de Hertogh (born 1972) is a Belgian actress.

== Debut ==
She was a student at the Royal Conservatory of Brussels from 1997 to 1998.

== Filmography ==
=== Cinema ===
Year	Title	Role	Director	Notes
2005	État d'âme		Xavier Mairesse	Short
2008	JCVD	The Toys Store manager	Mabrouk El Mechri	
2008	Formidable	The pharmacist	Dominique Standaert	
2008	Trouble at Timpetill	Édith Benz	Nicolas Bary	
2008	Charleville-Mézières	Simone Nina	Marguerite Didierjean	Short
2010	Le miroir	Marie	Sébastien Rossignol	Short
2011	Come as You Are	Claude	Geoffrey Enthoven	
2011	Moi, Michel G., milliardaire, maître du monde	Cashier	Stéphane Kazandjian	
2012	Dancing	Mitch	Marguerite Didierjean	Short
2013	Henri	Laetitia's friend	Yolande Moreau	
2013	Baby Balloon	Felicie	Stefan Liberski	
2013	The Scapegoat	The dissatisfied customer	Nicolas Bary	
2013	Je suis supporter du Standard	The nurse	Riton Liebman	
2013	Nous sommes tous des êtres penchés		Simon Lelouch	Short
2014	Salaud, on t'aime	Isabelle	Claude Lelouch	
2014	Le grimoire d'Arkandias	Catherine	Alexandre Castagnetti & Julien Simonet	
2014	Promotion canapé		Adrien François	Short
2014	Sacré Charlemagne	The science teacher	Adrien François	Short
2015	Judith		Basile Vuillemin	Short
2016	150 Milligrams	Corinne Zacharria	Emmanuelle Bercot	
2017	Vive la crise	Lola	Jean-François Davy	
2017	Lost in Paris	The laundery lover	Dominique Abel & Fiona Gordon	
2017	Nos patriotes	Noémie	Gabriel Le Bomin	
2017	Everyone's Life	Isabelle	Claude Lelouch	
2017	Hoe kamelen leeuwen worden	Robin	Lydia Rigaux	
2017	The Red Neon	The woman	Ledwin	Short
2019	Chamboultout	The bookstore customer	Éric Lavaine	
2019	100 kilos d'étoiles	Jocelyne	Marie-Sophie Chambon	
2019	Convoi exceptionnel	The baker	Bertrand Blier	
2019	Hey Joe	The mother	Matthieu Reynaert	Short
2019	Il Padrino		Jean-Luc Couchard	Short
2020	Ils surveillent	Anne	Quentin Moll-Van Roye	Short
2021	Lost Illusions	Bérénice	Xavier Giannoli	
2021	Stuck Together	The client	Dany Boon	
2022	Earwig	The concierge	Lucile Hadžihalilović	
2022	Les gentils	Blandine	Olivier Ringer	
2022	Bière Amère	Sonia	Julien Dewitte	Short
2023	Petites	The housemaid	Julie Lerat-Gersant	
2023	Coup de chance	Charlotte	Woody Allen	
2024	Des jours meilleurs		Elsa Bennett & Hippolyte Dard	Filming
2024	La vierge à l'enfant		Binevsa Berivan	Post-Production

=== Television ===
Year	Title	Role	Director	Notes
1999	Les hirondelles d'hiver		André Chandelle	TV movie
2001	Tania Boréalis ou L'étoile d'un été	Flora	Patrice Martineau	TV movie
2008	Françoise Dolto, le désir de vivre	The lingerie owner	Serge Le Péron	TV movie
2010	Le pot de colle		Julien Seri	TV movie
2011	Joseph l'insoumis	Madame Richet	Caroline Glorion	TV movie
2013	Les Petits Meurtres d'Agatha Christie	Bella Siatidis	Marc Angelo	TV series (1 episode)
2016	Accused	Brigitte	Mona Achache	TV series (1 episode)
2016	Section de recherches	Kathy	Vincent Giovanni	TV series (1 episode)
2017	Le viol	The principal	Alain Tasma	TV movie
2017	Funcorp	Patricia Krap	Benjamin Dessy & Xavier Ziomek	TV series (10 episodes)
2018	La révolte des innocents	Suzanne Roumier	Philippe Niang	TV movie
2018	Ils ont échangé mon enfant	Madame Kretz	Agnès Obadia	TV movie
2018	À l'intérieur	Leila	Vincent Lannoo	TV mini-series
2018	The Alienist	Two-Ton Annie	Jakob Verbruggen	TV series (1 episode)
2019	Prise au piège	Madeleine Leprince	Karim Ouaret	TV mini-series
2020	The Crimson Rivers	Marie-Pierre	David Morley	TV series (2 episodes)
2021	The Rope	Hélène	Dominique Rocher	TV mini-series
2024	Fortune de France	Maligou	Christopher Thompson	TV mini-series

== Theater ==
Year	Title	Author	Director
1995	Bulten	Bruce Ellison	Bruce Ellison
1995	Fool Moon	Bruce Ellison	Bruce Ellison
1996	Un Riche, Trois Pauvres	Louis Calaferte	Maurice Lambiotte
1997	Le Sang des Atrides	Aeschylus	Daniel Scahaise
1998	Canto General	Pablo Neruda	Jonathan Fox
1998	Les Héros de mon Enfance	Michel Tremblay	Bernard Marbaix & Thierry Janssen
1999-2000	Une Cendrillon des villes	Laurence Vielle	Pietro Pizzuti
1999-2002	Froth on the Daydream	Boris Vian	Bernard Damien
2000-2001	The Cherry Orchard	Anton Chekhov	Michel Kacenelenbogen
2002-2004	Les Héros de mon enfance	Michel Tremblay	Jean-Michel Flagothier & Marie-Paule Kumps
2004	27 Wagons Full of Cotton	Tennessee Williams	Roumen Tchakarov
2007	Menus Plaisirs	Jean Tardieu	Vincent Dujardin
2008	Rire est le propre de L'Homme	François Rabelais	Bernard Damien
2008	Malaga	Paul Emond	Albert-André Lheureux
2009	The Maids	Jean Genet	Bernard Damien
2010	Nathan the Wise	Gotthold Ephraim Lessing	Christine Delmotte
2015	On n’est pas là pour… Démaquiller les Coccinelles	Raymond Devos	Emmanuel Guillaume

== Awards and nominations ==
Year	Award	Nominated work	Result
2011	Magritte Award for Best Actress	Come as You Are	Nominated
2011	Ostend Film Festival - Best Supporting Actress	Come as You Are	Nominated
2017	Magritte Award for Best Supporting Actress	150 Milligrams	Nominated
2020	BizarroLand Film Festival - Mink Stole Award	Ils surveillent	Won
