= Bitter Melon (film) =

- Theatrical release poster
- Directed by: H.P. Mendoza
- Written by: H.P. Mendoza
- Produced by: Mark Del Lima; Brian Benson; Michael Oberst
- Starring: Jon Norman Schneider; Patrick Epino; Josephine de Jesus; L.A. Renigen; Theresa Navarro; Brian Rivera; Anna Ishida; Vint Carmona
- Cinematography: Juli Lopez
- Edited by: H.P. Mendoza
- Music by: H.P. Mendoza; Marco D'Ambrosio
- Production company: Ersatz Film
- Distributed by: Gravitas Ventures; ABS-CBN; Ersatz Film
- Release dates: May 12, 2018 (CAAMFest); December 25, 2018 (United States)
- Running time: 95 minutes
- Country: United States
- Languages: English; Ilocano
- Budget: $200,000

Bitter Melon, is an independent 2018 American dark comedy film written and directed by H.P. Mendoza. It debuted at the 2018 San Francisco International Asian American Film Festival and was released theatrically by ABS-CBN on December 7, 2018, and on home video by Gravitas Ventures on October 1, 2019. The film's title refers to the tropical vegetable with a bitter flavor known in the Philippines as ampalaya.

The screenplay was based on Mendoza's experiences with physical abuse in his nuclear family as well as his extended family, originally written in 1997 under the title He Ain't Heavy, He's My Brother based on the song by The Hollies.

On December 11, 2019, Bitter Melon was named one of "The 20 Best Bay Area Movies of the Decade" by The Mercury News after having placed on numerous "Best of 2018" lists.

== Plot ==
The film follows Declan as he returns to his hometown of San Francisco for Christmas only to realize that his second oldest brother, Troy, has been ruling the house with fear, physically abusing his wife, Shelly, and emotionally abusing his mother Prisa and daughter Mina. When eldest brother Moe arrives to complete the Christmas reunion, the festivities begin as the extended family shows up and the big Filipino Christmas can begin. But when cousin Tiva offers domestic violence support to the withdrawn Shelly, abusive Troy finds out and assaults Shelly for Declan and Moe to find when they get home. The next day, Declan and Moe are disturbed to discover that everyone in the house (Prisa, Shelly, Mina and Troy) all act as if nothing happened, even as Shelly nurses a bruised face. This leads Declan to propose a radical idea to the family: to kill Troy.

== Cast ==
- Jon Norman Schneider as Declan
- Patrick Epino as Troy
- Brian Rivera as Moe
- Theresa Navarro as Shelly
- L.A. Renigen as Tiva
- Josephine de Jesus as Prisa
- Amelie Anima as Mina
- Anna Ishida as Lisa
- Ryan Morales as Lionel
- Vint Carmona as Rogelio
- Sohr Picart as Divina
- Kyle Casey Chu as Jason
- Esperanza Catubig as Jeannie
- Corey Jackson as Marcus
- Safiya Fredericks as Julie
- Zoe Appenzeller as Arya
- Fatima David as Violet

== Themes ==
Mendoza has said that the script for Bitter Melon is his "only screenplay that doesn’t pass the Bechdel test, and for good reason. It’s a movie about how men treat women.” The commentary track on the home video release has Mendoza explaining that every seemingly random conversation in the film examines masculinity from different angles; from toxic masculinity in the household, to the perception of masculinity in the LGBT community, to the future of masculinity in the wake of its patriarchal past.

== Music ==
This is the first feature film directed by H.P. Mendoza to not be completely scored by him. His original intention was to have a "needle drop film" with a soundtrack consisting only of licensed music from his childhood, mixing local heroes like Carlos Santana with 1960s R&B groups like The Delfonics as well as actual 1950s recordings of Filipino folk songs by Bayanihan Philippine National Folk Dance Company. But the most crucial "needle drop" for Mendoza was the use of the song "He Ain't Heavy, He's My Brother" by The Hollies. After several fruitless attempts by music supervisor Terri D'Ambrosio to clear the rights to the actual song, Mendoza wrote his own musical number ("Wind Chime") for the finale of the film.

Though Mendoza could not clear the rights for any of the American songs, he was able to secure all of the Filipino folk songs. The rest of the songs were replaced by a new original score that both Mendoza and Marco D'Ambrosio co-composed.

== Budget ==
The film was initially funded by Cinematografo, an initiative created by ABS-CBN to grant $100,000 to Filipino-American filmmakers, but during production, H.P. Mendoza's production company, Ersatz Film, raised $100,000 more, half of which was raised on Kickstarter where it was featured as one of Kickstarter's "Projects We Love". The production also participated in the San Francisco "Scene in San Francisco Incentive Program" administered by the San Francisco Film Commission.

== Critical reception ==
On review aggregator Rotten Tomatoes, Bitter Melon holds an approval rating of 86% based on seven reviews. Critic Dennis Harvey of Variety called the film "H.P. Mendoza's best directorial feature to date." Ben Kenigsberg of The New York Times called the film "absorbing" and "distinguished by its willingness to [go] to some disturbing places", but criticized the ending for "grind[ing] to a halt in its final third as the characters talk things out, which might be helpful in life but in drama tends to belabor the obvious."

In a 50/50 review from Film Threat, Norm Gidney says, "There are scenes of utter brilliance and honesty, then clunky scenes of melodrama the next", while Tim Sika of the San Francisco Film Critics Circle called the film "an indie masterpiece" and "an absolutely beautiful movie about monsters and how they're made."

=== Best of Lists ===
- The 20 Best Bay Area Movies of the Decade - The Mercury News
- Best Films of 2018 - San Francisco Film Critics Circle
- Best Films of the Asian Diaspora 2018 - Polygon
- Best of 2018 - Entropy
- 31 Favorite Films of Outfest 2018 - The Advocate
- Top 10 Films of CAAMFEST - San Francisco Chronicle
- 5 Movies to See at CAAMFEST - Marin Independent Journal
- Must See Films at San Diego Asian Film Festival - San Diego Reader
- Top 12 Films at NewFest - Gay City News
- Top Films at Tallgrass Film Festival - Wichita Eagle
- Inspiring FilAms of 2018 - Philippine News

== Awards ==
- Best Narrative Feature - San Diego Asian Film Festival 2018
- Outstanding Ensemble Cast - Tallgrass Film Festival

== Home media ==
Bitter Melon was made available on Special Edition Blu-ray and DVD as well as in Digital HD via Gravitas Ventures on October 1, 2019.
