= Accused (2015 TV series) =

French television series

- Logo of the French name of the series when it was broadcast in France
- French: Accusé
- Genre: Legal drama; Crime drama; Anthology
- Based on: Accused by Jimmy McGovern
- Developed by: Laurent Vivier
- Country of origin: France
- Original language: French
- No. of seasons: 2
- No. of episodes: 12

Production
- Executive producers: Ivan Sadik; Pierre-Antoine Capton
- Production location: Lyon
- Camera setup: Multiple
- Running time: 52 minutes
- Production companies: 3e Œil Story; France Télévisions

Original release
- Network: France 2
- Release: 14 January 2015 – 11 May 2016

Accused (French: Accusé) was a French legal drama television anthology series created by Laurent Vivier, that is based on the 2010 British series of the same name. The series premiered on 14 January 2015 and aired on France 2. The show ended on 11 May 2016.

== Premise ==
In each episode, an ordinary citizen finds themself in the dock. We trace the thread of their life to understand the spiral that pushed them to a criminal act. Will they be found guilty or innocent?

== Production ==
=== Development ===
In January 2014, it was announced that the British TV show Accused was being adapted into a French one, produced by 3e Œil Story and aired France 2. The series was originally title Dérapage before being renamed Accused (French: Accusé). In early 2015, the show was renewed for a second season.

=== Filming ===
Season 1 was filmed between January and April 2014 in Lyon.

== Episodes ==
=== Series overview ===
| Series | Episodes | Originally released | |
| Series | Episodes | First released | Last released |
|---|---|---|---|
| 1 | 6 | 14 January 2015 | 28 January 2015 |
| 2 | 6 | 27 April 2016 | 11 May 2016 |

=== Season 1 ===
| # | Title | Director | Writer | Original release date | France viewers (millions) |
|---|---|---|---|---|---|
| 1 | "Hélène's Story" | Julien Despaux | Laurent Vivier, based on an idea from Kamel Guemra and Sledge Bidounga | 14 January 2015 | 3.78 |
Clémentine Célarié as Hélène Vidal, Michel Voïta as Marc Levasseur, Jérôme Kircher as Jean Gabard, Benjamin Siksou as Nicolas, ...
| 2 | "Laurent's Story" | Julien Despaux | Laurent Vivier | 14 January 2015 | 3.32 |
Lorànt Deutsch as Laurent Acuario, Fanny Valette as Juliette Cassel, ...
| 3 | "Martin's Story" | Didier Bivel | Laurent Vivier | 21 January 2015 | 3.61 |
Pascal Légitimus as Martin Forestier, Natacha Lindinger as Agathe Delors, ...
| 4 | "Sophie's Story" | Didier Bivel | Laurent Vivier, Emilie Clamart-Marsollat, and Anne Valton | 21 January 2015 | 3.20 |
Isabelle Gélinas as Sophie, Éric Savin as Fred, Mata Gabin as Catherine, Florence Loiret Caille as Violette, ...
| 5 | "Simon's Story" | Didier Bivel | Laurent Vivier | 28 January 2015 | 3.94 |
Bruno Wolkowitch as Simon, Julie-Anne Roth as Charlotte, ...
| 6 | "Claire's Story" | Julien Despaux | Laurent Vivier and Kamel Guemra | 28 January 2015 | 3.42 |
Hélène de Fougerolles as Claire Brattner, Antoine Duléry as Pierre Adamas, ...

=== Season 2 ===
| # | Title | Director | Writer | Original release date | France viewers (millions) |
|---|---|---|---|---|---|
| 1 | "Nathalie's Story" | Mona Achache | Sébastien Vitoux, Kristel Mudry, and Jimmy McGovern | 27 April 2016 | 4.43 |
Michèle Bernier as Nathalie, ...
| 2 | "Arnaud's Story" | Julien Despaux | Anne Valton, Emilie Clamart-Marsollat, and Frédéric Chansel | 27 April 2016 | 3.58 |
Thierry Frémont as Arnaud, Lubna Azabal as Samia
| 3 | "Cécile's Story" | Julien Despaux | Sébastien Vitoux, Kristel Mudry, and Jimmy McGovern | 4 May 2016 | 3.19 |
Émilie Dequenne as Cécile, Nina Meurisse as Eva, ...
| 4 | "Léo's Story" | Julien Despaux | Laurent Vivier, Lionel Combecau, and Jimmy McGovern | 4 May 2016 | 3.11 |
Grégory Fitoussi as Léo, Patrick Descamps as Maxime, ...
| 5 | "Jean's Story" | Mona Achache | Laurent Vivier, Mona Achache, and Jimmy McGovern | 11 May 2016 | 3.33 |
Thierry Godard as Jean, Édith Scob as Colette, Pascale Arbillot as Danielle, ...
| 6 | "Chloé's Story" | Mona Achache | Laurent Vivier, Lionel Combecau, and Mélina Jochum | 11 May 2016 | 2.93 |
Marilou Berry as Chloé, Isabelle de Hertogh as Brigitte, Olivia Côte as Elizabeth Caussier, ...
