= KINO Tech =

American technology and film company

KINO Tech (commonly known as KINO) is an American technology and film company founded in 2022 and headquartered in Los Angeles, California. The company runs KINO Studios, a film financing fund, often informally called "KINO" like the parent company.

== Overview ==
KINO was founded in 2022 by Daril Fannin, David Fannin, and Brit MacRae. Daril Fannin, a former U.S. Army medic turned screenwriter, previously created the Netflix series The Green Beret's Guide to Surviving the Apocalypse with executive producers Matt Damon and Peter Berg. He later co-wrote a comedy pilot with Jimmy Kimmel that was ordered by ABC in 2020. Brit MacRae has an established a career as an actor with lead appearances in the Netflix film Neon Lights and the Peacock series Departure, while David Fannin joined as the technical co-founder in the company's early stages.

In 2023, during a downturn in Los Angeles film and television production following the Writers Guild of America strike, KINO launched its inaugural short film festival.

The event carried a $25,000 grand prize and was sponsored by Backstage, Final Draft, and Panavision. Wesley Wang's short film Nothing, Except Everything won the festival and was subsequently acquired for feature adaptation by Sony TriStar, with Darren Aronofsky's Protozoa Pictures attached to produce.

Also in 2023, KINO raised more than $2 million in pre-seed financing from investors including Cathie Wood's ARK Venture Fund, Sequoia Capital's Scout Fund, and Slow Ventures. By 2024, the company had raised a total of $4.25 million.

In 2024, KINO introduced its interactive digital cinema platform, allowing filmmakers to host live virtual screenings with real-time audience interaction.^{[4]} In September, it premiered Courage Rising, a documentary about burn survivors climbing Mount Kilimanjaro, which featured an appearance by Jay Leno. Later in that year, KINO released All You Need Is Blood starring Mena Suvari, along with Molli and Max in the Future, The Secret Art of Human Flight, Empire Waist, and Across the River and Into the Trees starring Josh Hutcherson and Liev Schrieber.

KINO was represented at IndieWire's 2024 Future of Filmmaking Summit, where its interactive platform and data-driven distribution model were highlighted.

In 2025, KINO launched ScreenKey, a secure video platform for the film and television industry. ScreenKey supports production and distribution stages, including daily reviews, collaborative post-production feedback, screener distribution with viewer analytics, interactive market testing, and white-label streaming for audience releases. In the same year, KINO produced Ian Tuason's horror film Undertone, which premiered at Fantasia Fest and was acquired by A24 in a mid-seven-figure deal.
