= Jeannie Barroga =

American dramatist

Jeannie Barroga (born 1949) is a Filipino American playwright.

== Early life and education ==
Barroga was born in Milwaukee, Wisconsin in 1949. When she was a child, she and her family were the only people of color who lived in their neighborhood, and she has described this early experience of cultural difference as an inspiration for much of her later writing. She attended the University of Wisconsin–Milwaukee and graduated in 1972 with a bachelor's degree in Fine Arts. She moved to California after college and remains a resident of the Bay Area.

== Career ==
Barroga began writing plays in 1979, after her father's death. Her body of work includes more than 50 plays which have been produced for the stage, for radio and for television. Barroga's writing is concerned with the Filipino American diaspora, as well as intergenerational relationships within immigrant families.

Her career extends beyond playwriting to include work as a theater producer and director. She was literary manager for the Oakland Ensemble Theater, and has served as an artistic director for the Asian American Theater Company and Teatro ng Tanan in San Francisco. In 1983, she founded the Playwright Forum in Palo Alto to support new works by California writers. The organization would later become the Discovery Project after merging with TheatreWorks, where Barroga has also been a literary manager. Barroga has taught playwriting at California State University, Monterey Bay and Colorado College as well as in Bay Area high schools.

Barroga has also acted in television and film. She played the unseen clairvoyant Sylvia in H.P. Mendoza's 2012 horror movie I Am A Ghost.

Her plays have been anthologized in Unbroken Thread: An Anthology of Plays By Asian American Women; Bold Words: A Century of Asian American Writing; and But Still, Like Air, I'll Rise: New Asian American Plays. She is a member of the Dramatists Guild and the Theater Communications Group. Barroga's archive is collected by the Stanford University Libraries.

== Selected works ==
Barroga's produced works include The Pigeon Man (1979), Reaching for the Stars (1983), Eye of the Coconut (1987), Kenny Was a Shortstop (1991), Talk-Story (1992), Walls (1993), Rita's Resources (1995), A Good Face (1997), Gadgets (2000), Banyan (2005), and My Friend Morty (2006).

Walls (1989), which premiered at the Asian American Theater Company in San Francisco, was inspired by Jan Scruggs's book To Heal A Nation. The play is about a Chinese-American reporter covering the controversy surrounding Maya Lin's design for the Vietnam Veterans Memorial. It uses the memorial wall as both subject and metaphorical theme, looking at the intersection of politics and art, the history of the Vietnam War, and the divisions – ethnic and otherwise – that characterize the contemporary American experience. The play frames the aesthetic and political objections to Lin's design as part of a larger struggle to define what it means to be American, and what perspectives are allowed to contribute to official history and public memory.

Buffaloe'd (2012) is a historical drama that explores the colonization of the Philippines through the experiences of African-American "buffalo soldiers" who fought there. It centers around the real-life story of David Fagen, who defected from his U.S. regiment and joined the Filipino resistance efforts. It premiered at the San Jose Stage Company with choreography by Alleluia Panis and directed by Anthony J. Haney. It was produced by the Kumu Kahua Theatre in Honolulu, Hawaii in 2017, in a production directed by Reb Beau Allen.

== Publications ==
Two Plays: Kenny was a Shortstop and The Reverend Mrs. Newton (San Francisco: Philippines Resource Center, 1993)

Walls in Roberta Uno, ed. Unbroken Thread: An Anthology of Plays By Asian American Women (Amherst: University of Massachusetts Press, 1993)

Talk-Story in Velina Hasu Hudson, ed. But Still, Like Air, I'll Rise: New Asian American Plays (Philadelphia: Temple University Press, 1997)
