= Heavy Duty (film) =

- French: Convoi exceptionnel
- Directed by: Bertrand Blier
- Written by: Bertrand Blier
- Produced by: Olivier Delbosc
- Starring: Gérard Depardieu; Christian Clavier
- Edited by: Marion Monestier
- Music by: Grégoire Hetzel
- Production companies: Curiosa Films; Orange Studio; Les Productions Chaocorp; Ouille Productions; Versus Production; VOO; Be tv; RTBF
- Distributed by: Orange Studio Distribution
- Release date: 13 March 2019
- Countries: France; Belgium
- Language: French
- Box office: $785,000

Heavy Duty (French: Convoi exceptionnel) is a French film directed by Bertrand Blier, starring Gérard Depardieu and Christian Clavier. It premiered on 13 March 2019.

== Plot ==
Two men, one dressed in an overcoat and one dressed in rags, possess a script detailing their lives and deaths.

== Cast ==
- Gérard Depardieu as Raoul Taupin
- Christian Clavier as Foster
- Farida Rahouadj as Esther Combasse
- Alex Lutz as Edouard
- Audrey Dana as Zoé
- Alexandra Lamy as Sabine
- Louis-Do de Lencquesaing as Arthur Combasse
- Sylvie Testud as Jennifer
- Bouli Lanners as Patrick Boyard
- Guy Marchand as The old producer
- Charlie Dupont as Labouze
- Philippe Magnan as Inspector Bonito
- Isabelle de Hertogh as The baker
- Jean Dell as Jérôme Le Réveillé

== Production ==
The film is produced by Curiosa Films, Ouille Productions and Versus Production, with co-production support from Orange Studio. It reunites Christian Clavier and Gérard Depardieu who previously starred as Asterix and Obelix in two films. It also reunites Blier and Depardieu, who had collaborated on films such as Going Places, Get Out Your Handkerchiefs, Buffet froid and Merci la vie.

Filming began on 16 February 2018 and wrapped up on late March.
