= Asta Philpot =

American man (born 1982)

Asta Anthony Philpot (born Miami, Florida 1982) is an American man who was the protagonist of a 2007 BBC One documentary film titled For one night only. He was born with arthrogryposis, which impairs his physical ability of movement. He advocates the right to an active sexual life for people with disabilities, even if this means paying for sex.

After hearing of a legal brothel with access for wheelchair during a vacation in Spain in 2006, he visited the place and lost his virginity. He found this experience very interesting and decided, therefore, to organize a trip with other people sharing his extreme difficulties in finding a romantic or sexual relationship as a consequence of physical disabilities, advertising his intentions through dedicated Internet forums.

Although finding initial resistance to the idea, two other young men, affected with different medical conditions (one legally blind and the other paralysed in a motorcycle accident) agreed to join the vacation with the purpose to visit the Spanish night club and have the opportunity of a sexual encounter. A BBC documentary team headed by producer/director Jane Beckwith filmed it: the documentary opened some controversies about the opportunity to legalize prostitution in UK, as a means of giving sexual experiences to physically disabled people, who often lack enough social opportunities to build a love relationship, although having normal social potential and normal feelings and sexual needs.

His experiences contributed to the acclaimed Belgian 2011 film Come as You Are (original title Hasta La Vista), written by Mariano Vanhoof and directed by Geoffrey Enthoven.

== See also ==
- Nina de Vries is a Dutch sex worker who offers erotic massages to men and women with mental disabilities in Germany.
- Come As You Are, a 2019 comedy-drama film based on the 2011 Belgian film
