= James Huang (actor) =

American actor

- Born: James Huang; January 11, 1977
- Occupation: television actor

James Huang (born January 11, 1977) is an American film and television actor and producer/director.

== Career ==
He worked in several areas of film and television.

He has acted professionally since 1996 in film, television, commercials, voice over. Guest starring television appearances include Grey's Anatomy and Castle on ABC and NCIS: Los Angeles on CBS. Highlights include The Unit, Shark, Las Vegas, NCIS, Law & Order, Boldly Going Nowhere, Private Practice, Law & Order: Los Angeles, and recurring roles in ABC's Women's Murder Club, TNT's Rizzoli & Isles, General Hospital and Young Rock. He has also appeared in sitcoms including Will & Grace and The New Adventures of Old Christine. Feature film roles include the DreamWorks feature film, Eagle Eye, the Disney/Bruckheimer feature film G-Force, the 2010 alien invasion film Skyline. He plays Marcus in the 2014 film Nightcrawler.

As a director and producer, he won a Prism Award for the MTV documentary True Life: I'm Addicted to Crystal Meth.

Huang wrote and directed the feature film Starting from Scratch and landed a distribution deal with MouseTrap Films through their platform Film Festival Flix. The dramatic comedy won Best Comedy at the Asians on Film Festival, Best Editing and the Vanguard Award for Best Ensemble Cast from the Independent Filmmakers Showcase Los Angeles, an Honorable Mention for Best Film at the New Jersey Film Festival, and top honors for Best Feature Film at the DisOrient Film Festival. James wrote and directed two more feature film comedies '1st Date' and 'Get You Back'.
