= Stephen Dypiangco =

American filmmaker

- Born: Stephen Dypiangco
- Years active: 2000–present
- Website: www.stephendypiangco.com

Stephen Dypiangco is an American filmmaker. He was a Producer of Marketing and Distribution for Luke Matheny's Oscar-Winning short film, God of Love. He was also a Producer of Marketing and Distribution for Mark Wexler's documentary How to Live Forever. He has also directed a short documentary entitled Made In The Bronx which was a Regional Finalist for the Student Academy Awards and won the Best Documentary prize at the Starz First Look Student Film Festival. Along with Patrick Epino he makes up the "National Film Society" which is part of PBS and makes original web content about films, film festivals and filmmaking, viewable online.

Other than Made In The Bronx, Dypiangco has directed and written a narrative short film entitled "Clean" which has screened at the Asian American International Film Festival, the Palm Springs International Festival of Short Films, the Hawaii International Film Festival and more. Dypiangco's narrative thesis short film while at NYU Film School, All Americana was also fully funded by the nonprofit Center for Community Change and premiered at the San Diego Latino Film Festival. He is currently editing a feature documentary that he wrote and directed entitled Home Unknown - which follows his journey to the Philippines to understand his heritage, Filipino American identity and his parents. Other short films he has directed and written include Alone With You and Irish Blood.

Dypiangco's most recent film (and also web series), which he co-wrote and co-directed with Patrick Epino, is Awesome Asian Bad Guys, which stars a number of Asian American actors who played villains in 1980-1990s action movies, such as Al Leong, Yuji Okumoto and George Cheung. The film/series also stars Tamlyn Tomita, Dante Basco, Randall Park, Aaron Takahashi and more. The film/series made its debut at the 2014 CAAMFest and also made its Los Angeles premiere at the 2014 Los Angeles Asian Pacific Film Festival.

Dypiangco is a graduate of the graduate film program at New York University and also Georgetown University's School of Foreign Service.

== Filmography ==
- Awesome Asian Bad Guys (2014) - Writer, Director (with Patrick Epino)
- All Americana (2009)- Writer, Director
- Alone With You (2007) - Writer, Director
- Made in the Bronx (2006) - Writer, Director
- Clean (2005) - Writer, Director
- Irish Blood (2004) - Writer, Director

As Producer of Marketing and Distribution:

- God of Love (2010)
- How to Live Forever (2009)
