= H.P. Mendoza =

American singer-songwriter

- Born: March 13, 1977 (age 49); San Francisco, California, U.S.
- Spouse: Mark Del Lima (m. 2013)
- Website: www.hpmendoza.com

H. P. Mendoza is an American filmmaker and musician.

He is best known for his micro-budget work as screenwriter, composer and lyricist on Colma: The Musical (2006) which was placed in the Los Angeles Times Top 20 Best Asian American Films List, as well as his follow-up musical and directorial debut, Fruit Fly (2010).

Mendoza was born and raised in San Francisco.

The Secret Art of Human Flight premiered at the 2023 Tribeca Film Festival. Filmed in Massachusetts, it is Mendoza's first film not filmed in San Francisco.

== Honors ==
After writing and directing the 2012 film I Am a Ghost, Mendoza was inducted into the 2012 Essential SF by San Francisco Film Society. In 2017, he was a resident of the San Francisco Filmhouse for his screenplay, Bitter Melon which was released by Gravitas Ventures and ABS-CBN.

On January 9, 2024, H.P. Mendoza was named the recipient of the Marlon Riggs Award by the San Francisco Bay Area Film Critics Circle for "representing courage and innovation in the world of cinema."

== Film ==
Year	Film	Credited as						Role
Year	Film	Director	Cinematographer	Writer	Editor	Music	Actor	Role
2006	Colma: The Musical			Yes		Yes	Yes	Rodel
2009	Fruit Fly	Yes		Yes	Yes	Yes	Yes	Mark
2011	Longhorns				Yes	Yes		
2012	Yes, We're Open			Yes		Yes	Yes	Brett
2013	I Am a Ghost	Yes	Yes	Yes	Yes	Yes		
2015	Great Hymn of Thanksgiving/Conversation Storm	Yes	Yes		Yes			
2016	Superpowerless						Yes	Sam (Liberty Boy)
2018	Bitter Melon	Yes		Yes	Yes	Yes		
2021	Attack, Decay, Release	Yes	Yes	Yes	Yes	Yes	Yes	Orange Astronaut
2024	The Secret Art of Human Flight	Yes		Yes	Yes	Yes	Yes	Orderly

== Discography ==
- 2004 - Everything is Pop
- 2006 - Nomad
- 2006 - Colma: The Musical (original motion picture soundtrack)
- 2009 - Fruit Fly (original motion picture soundtrack)
- 2009 - Elsewhere
- 2011 - Longhorns (original motion picture soundtrack)
- 2012 - I Am a Ghost (original motion picture soundtrack)
- 2012 - Yes, We're Open (original motion picture soundtrack)
- 2016 - Everything is Broken (Digital Crafts Night)
- 2021 - Folx
- 2022 - Attack, Decay, Release
- 2023 - The Secret Art of Human Flight (original motion picture soundtrack)
