= Fruit Fly (film) =

- Poster
- Directed by: H.P. Mendoza
- Written by: H.P. Mendoza
- Starring: H.P. Mendoza; L.A. Renigen; Mike Curtis; Theresa Navarro; Aaron Zaragoza; E.S. Park; Christian Cagigal; Don Wood; Michelle Talgarow
- Music by: H.P. Mendoza
- Release dates: March 15, 2009 (SFIAAFF); August 11, 2010 (United States)
- Running time: 94 minutes
- Country: United States
- Language: English

Fruit Fly is a 2009 musical film with gay and Asian-American themes, directed by H.P. Mendoza, who wrote the screenplay for Colma The Musical (2007). The film, made entirely in San Francisco, premiered on March 15, 2009, at the San Francisco International Asian American Film Festival at the Castro Theatre in San Francisco. It had a limited one-week run in New York on September 24, 2010.

== Plot ==
Fruit Fly is a musical comedy about Bethesda, a Filipina performance artist finding home in the unlikeliest places. She moves into an artist commune in an attempt to workshop her latest piece which deals with finding her biological mother. In the process, she finds an artistic family, clues of her mother's whereabouts, and the startling possibility that she just might be a fag-hag.

Subplots include her relationship with her roommates in the artist commune, and their relationships with each other.

== Cast ==
- L. A. Renigen as Bethesda
- Ivan de Guzman as himself
- Mike Curtis
- Aaron Zaragoza
- E.S. Park
- Theresa Navarro
- Christian Cagigal
- Don Wood
- Michelle Talgarow
- H.P. Mendoza
- Christina Augello

== Awards ==
- Best Narrative Feature - Audience Award - San Francisco International Asian American Film Festival
- Best Overall Film - Fort Worth LGBT Film Festival
- Rising Star Award - Philadelphia International Gay & Lesbian Film Festival

== History ==
During the festival life of Colma: The Musical, Mendoza and actress L.A. Renigen would jump back and forth from gay film festival to Asian film festival for about a year. After experiencing the strange treatment Renigen would receive from gay men (automatically labeling her as a "fag hag"), he decided to create Bethesda, a character based on Renigen. Bethesda, like Renigen, is a performance artist who moves to San Francisco to workshop her latest performance piece dealing with finding her biological mother. Also like Renigen, Bethesda finds herself going to gay bars every night and getting labeled a "fag hag". The musical film, called "irresistible" by the San Francisco Chronicle was funded by the Center for Asian American Media and was awarded the Best Narrative Feature Audience Award at the 2009 San Francisco International Asian American Film Festival.

== Legacy ==
In 2019, Fruit Fly was listed in the Los Angeles Times as one of the 100 films in "The Asian American Canon" and was celebrated for its 10th anniversary at the 2020 CAAMFest.

== Screenings ==
- San Francisco International Asian American Film Festival - Centerpiece
- Outfest - Four in Focus
- Frameline
- Boston LGBT Film Festival - Closing Night
- Silk Screen Asian American Film Festival
- Seattle International Film Festival
- Fort Worth LGBT Film Festival - Opening Night
- Philadelphia International Gay & Lesbian Film Festival - Centerpiece
- New York Asian Film Festival - Closing Night
- Rhode Island International Film Festival
- Vancouver Queer Film Festival
- Fresno LGBT Film Festival
- Savannah LGBT Film Festival
- Southwest Gay and Lesbian Film Festival
- Toronto Reel Asian International Film Festival
- San Diego Asian Film Festival
- Milwaukee LGBT Film & Video Festival
- Hawaii International Film Festival
- Montreal LGBT Film Festival
- Chicago LGBT International Film Festival
- Austin Asian American Film Festival
- Rehoboth Independent Film Festival
- Hong Kong LGBT Film Festival
