= Hayden Szeto =

Canadian actor (born 1985)

- Born: Hayden Chun Hay Szeto; September 11, 1985 (age 40); Vancouver, British Columbia, Canada
- Education: Kwantlen Polytechnic University; New York Film Academy
- Occupation: Actor
- Years active: 2011–present

Hayden Chun Hay Szeto (born September 11, 1985) is a Canadian actor, known for his role as Erwin Kim in the comedy-drama film The Edge of Seventeen (2016). In 2017, he portrayed Ken Luang in the NBC comedy series The Good Place.

== Early life ==
Szeto was raised in the Richmond, British Columbia area, with two parents from Hong Kong. Szeto comes from a long line of artistic talent. His father, Nigel Szeto, is a painter, and his paternal grandfather, Kei Szeto (司徒奇 Situ Qi, 司徒奇), was a revered Chinese sculptor. His great-grand father Szeto Mei was a notable poet. He studied sociology at Kwantlen Polytechnic University. Szeto graduated from the New York Film Academy's Acting for Film program in 2011.

== Career ==
In 2016, Szeto made his breakthrough role playing Erwin Kim in Kelly Fremon Craig's coming-of-age comedy-drama The Edge of Seventeen alongside Hailee Steinfeld. He appeared in two episodes in the second season of NBC's comedy series The Good Place, portraying a Buddhist monk named Ken Luang.

On May 24, 2017, Szeto was cast as Brad Chang in the Blumhouse supernatural thriller film Truth or Dare. The film was released in theaters on April 13, 2018.

== Filmography ==
=== Film ===
Year	Title	Role	Notes
2012	Secret Asian Man: Rise of the Zodiac!	Young Sam Starr	
2012	Free Love	Restaurant Patron	Short film
2016	The Edge of Seventeen	Erwin Kim	
2018	Truth or Dare	Brad Chang	
2019	Come As You Are	Matt	
2019	Summer Night	Caleb Grass	
2020	Tigertail	Eric	
2021	Yes Day	Officer Chang	
2022	Sex Appeal	Mr. Vemmer	Hulu film

=== Television ===
Year	Title	Role	Notes
2011	Man of Light	Jaiden Long	Television film
2012	America's Most Wanted	3rd Gang Member	Episode: "Crimes of Passion"
2017	The Good Place	Ken Luang	2 episodes
2018	Lodge 49	Corporate	6 episodes
2019	Arrested Development	Jeremy	Episode: "Saving for Arraignment Day"
2019	The Good Doctor	Tony Liu	Episode: "Incomplete"
2019	What We Do in the Shadows	Jonathan Cadgar	2 episodes
2019	Magnum P.I.	Detective Pono Palima	Episode: "Make It 'til Dawn"
