= Arlo Technologies =

Internet-connected smart home brand

Arlo Technologies, Inc.
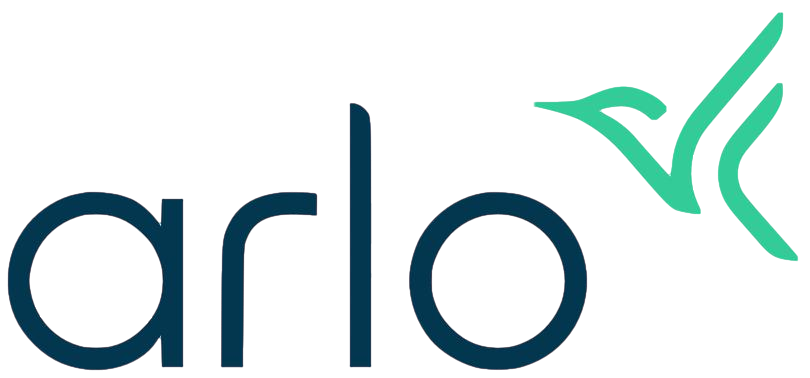
- Type: Public
- Traded as: NYSE: ARLO; S&P 600 component Russell 2000 Index component
- Industry: Surveillance cameras
- Founded: 2014 (as a division of Netgear); 2018 (as an independent company)
- Headquarters: San Jose, California, United States
- Key people: Matthew McRae (CEO); Kurtis Binder (CFO); Brian Busse (General Counsel and Secretary)
- Products: Surveillance cameras
- Revenue: ▼US$357 million (2020)
- Number of employees: 355 (2021)
- Website: arlo.com

Arlo Technologies is an American company that makes wireless surveillance cameras. Prior to an initial public offering (IPO) on the New York Stock Exchange in August 2018, Arlo was a brand of such products by Netgear, which retained majority control after the IPO.

According to the company, it has shipped 21.6 million devices, has 5.82 million registered accounts, and has 877,000 paid accounts, as of January 2022.

== History ==
On February 6, 2018, Netgear made the announcement that its board of directors had unanimously approved the separation of its Arlo business from Netgear. During the second quarter of 2018, Netgear's Arlo unit became a holding of Arlo Technologies, Inc. Netgear issued less than 20% of the Arlo common stock in the IPO, allowing it to retain majority control.

The CEO of Arlo is Matthew McRae. McRae joined Netgear in October 2017 when he was hired as senior vice president of strategy.

== Products ==
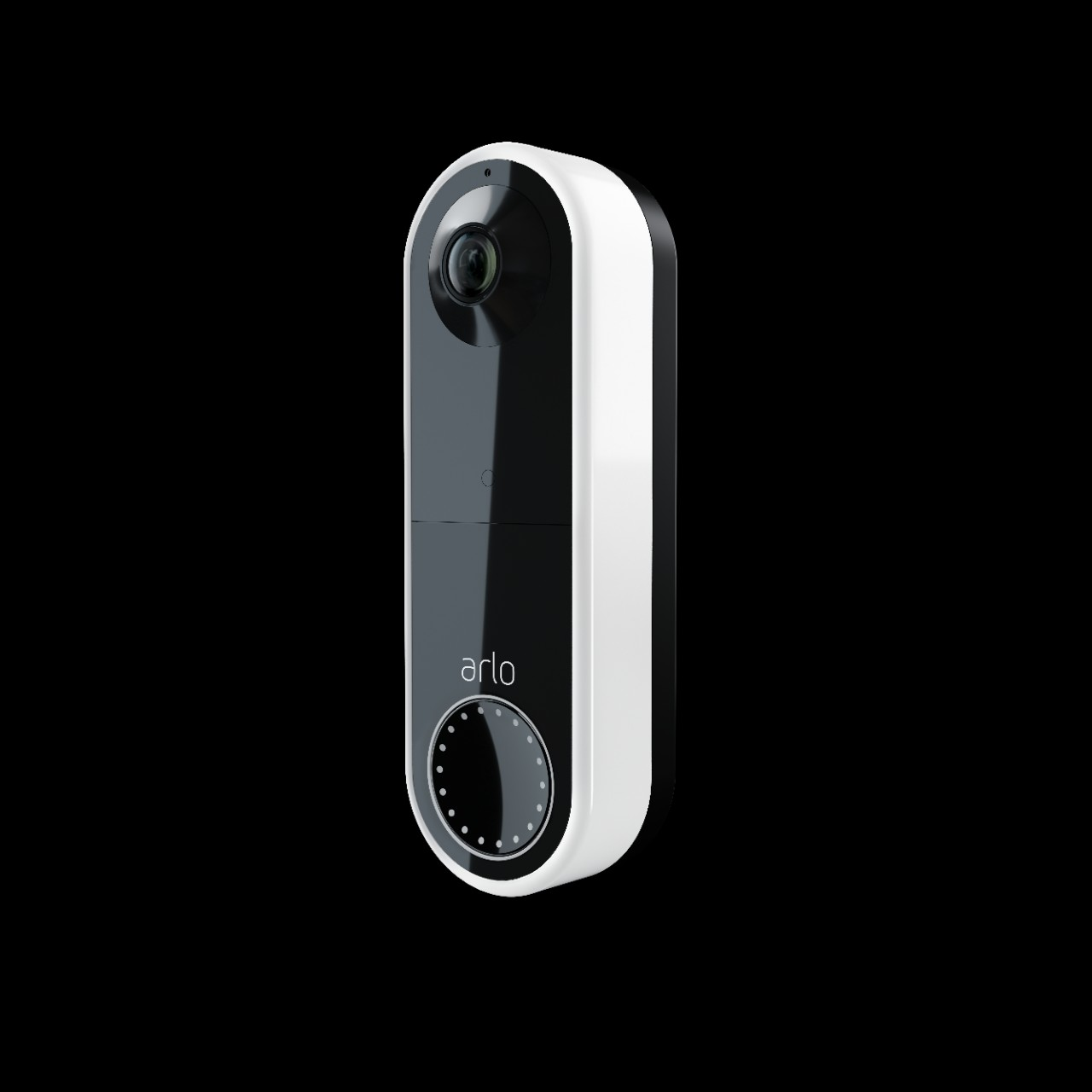
Arlo video doorbell.

Arlo makes products such as the Arlo Security Camera, as well as portable and baby monitoring cameras. Arlo cameras are designed to save energy by use of a low-power standby mode.

== Manufacturing ==
Arlo manufacturing is outsourced to Foxconn and Pegatron.
