= Jacob Newton =

Australian rules footballer (born 2006)

Personal information
- Born: 20 March 2006 (age 20)
- Original team: Norwood
- Draft: No. 9, 2025 mid-season rookie draft
- Debut: Round 23, 2025, West Coast vs. Western Bulldogs, at Marvel Stadium
- Height: 178 cm (5 ft 10 in)
- Position: Forward

Club information
- Current club: West Coast
- Number: 46

Playing career^{1}
Years	Club	Games (Goals)
2025–	West Coast	5 (2)
- ^{1} Playing statistics correct to the end of round 22, 2026.

Jacob Newton (born 20 March 2006) is an Australian rules footballer who plays for the West Coast Eagles in the Australian Football League (AFL).

== Junior and SANFL career ==
Newton played for Norwood in the SANFL under 18s. He also represented South Australia in the AFL U18 Championships, averaging 11.5 disposals and 1.5 goals a game.

After going undrafted in the 2024 AFL draft Newton signed with Norwood in the SANFL. He kicked 7 goals in 4 games.

== AFL career ==
Newton was selected by West Coast with pick 9 of the 2025 mid-season rookie draft. He made his debut in round 23 of the 2025 AFL season.

Ahead of round 5 of the 2026 AFL season, Newton was ruled out for the remainder of the season after requiring navicular surgery.

== Statistics ==
Updated to the end of round 22, 2026.

Legend
G	Goals	K	Kicks	D	Disposals	T	Tackles
B	Behinds	H	Handballs	M	Marks

Season	Team	No.	Games	Totals							Averages (per game)							Votes
Season	Team	No.	Games	G	B	K	H	D	M	T	G	B	K	H	D	M	T	Votes
2025	West Coast	46	2	1	1	6	0	6	2	4	0.5	0.5	3.0	0.0	3.0	1.0	2.0	0
2026	West Coast	46	3	1	3	12	9	21	2	7	0.3	1.0	4.0	3.0	7.0	0.7	2.3	0
Career			5	2	4	18	9	27	4	11	0.4	0.8	3.6	1.8	5.4	0.8	2.2	0
