= Ascolta =

ascolta is a modern music ensemble. Its programming runs the gamut from classical modernism to the limits of contemporary classical and its boundary with rock music. The main focus of the ensemble's work is on world and national premieres of compositions written for the group.

== History ==
The ensemble ascolta was formed in 2003 by seven musicians and is based in Stuttgart. It has its origins in the ensemble "Varianti", part of the "Musik der Jahrhunderte", which performed contemporary music in varying formations between 1994 and 2002, both in Germany and abroad.

== Profile ==
The instrumentation of ascolta concentrates on brass and percussion, without woodwinds or upper strings. This is a deliberate counter to that of very many other new music ensembles, which tend to have Schoenberg's "Pierrot Lunaire" as reference. It is ascolta's intention to create a substantial repertoire of compositions and arrangements for this instrumentation and to establish it as standard repertory. Around 250 new pieces have been premiered in ascolta concerts. The ensemble performs also in subsets of its members, e.g. as duos or trios.

== Members ==
ascolta has a fixed lineup with seven musicians and is organised entirely independently. Current members are: Markus Schwind (trumpets / flugelhorn / slide trumpet), Andrew Digby (trombones / euphonium / bass trumpet), Florian Hoelscher (piano, harpsichord, synthesiser), Boris Müller and Julian Belli (percussion), Erik Borgir (violoncello / electric cello), Hubert Steiner (guitars / electric guitars / bass guitars / mandolin / banjo)
