= Howard Gewirtz =

American television producer and writer

Howard Gewirtz (born January 26, 1952) is an American television producer and writer, whose credits include Taxi, The Larry Sanders Show, Just Shoot Me!, Wings, Oliver Beene, Everybody Hates Chris, Gary & Mike and The Simpsons.

He is the uncle of Brian Gewirtz, a writer who wrote for WWE programming and serves as senior vice president of Seven Bucks Productions.

== Career ==
He was born January 26, 1952, in Rego Park, Queens in New York. His father was a dentist who invented Firmadent, a type of toothbrush. Predominantly working as a comedy writer, Gewirtz's first writing credit was for Busting Loose in 1977. Three years later, he penned the Three's Company episode "Mighty Mouth." Gewirtz wrote episodes of Taxi (also functioning as a producer) and Bosom Buddies during the 1980s. He received a Primetime Emmy Award nomination for his work on the former.

Gewirtz wrote the premiere episode of the short-lived sitcom Domestic Life, which reviewer Tom Shales found to be "moderately endearing" but lacking in humor. He served as an executive producer of Down and Out in Beverly Hills in 1987, a sitcom for the fledgling Fox network based on the 1986 film of the same name. Like Domestic Life, it was cancelled after one season.

As a freelance writer, Gewirtz wrote "Homer Defined" for The Simpsons during its third season. It was Gewirtz who gave Milhouse Van Houten the character's last name. He penned episodes of The Larry Sanders Show and Wings throughout the 1990s.

In the late 1990s, Gewirtz executive produced Jenny, a sitcom starring Jenny McCarthy. After working on Just Shoot Me!, Gewirtz created the Fox sitcom Oliver Beene, which ran from 2003 to 2004. He based several of the characters on family members, while the title character was modeled after his childhood self. The series received negative reviews from television critics.

Gewirtz earned his second Emmy Award nomination for co-writing a song featured on UPN series Gary & Mike. He executive produced Everybody Hates Chris during its first season, for which he received a Golden Globe Award nomination in the category of best television series (musical or comedy).

== Bibliography ==
The Simpsons

- "Homer Defined"

Gary & Mike

- "Phish Phry"
- "New York, New York"
