= Colma: The Musical =

- Directed by: Richard Wong
- Screenplay by: H.P. Mendoza
- Story by: H.P. Mendoza; Richard Wong
- Produced by: Richard Wong; Paul Kolsanoff
- Starring: Jake Moreno; H.P. Mendoza; L.A. Renigen; Sigrid Sutter; Larry Soriano; Brian Raffi
- Cinematography: Richard Wong
- Edited by: Richard Wong
- Music by: H.P. Mendoza
- Production company: Greenrocksolid
- Distributed by: Roadside Attractions
- Release dates: March 21, 2006 (CAAMFest); June 22, 2007 (United States)
- Running time: 100 minutes
- Country: United States
- Language: English
- Budget: $15,000
- Box office: $41,131

Colma: The Musical is a 2006 American musical independent film directed by Richard Wong and written by H.P. Mendoza. The film, which is Wong's feature directorial debut, is a coming of age story based on the lives and the relationships between three teenagers living in Colma. Colma: The Musical features 13 songs all written and produced by H.P. Mendoza.

The film premiered on March 21, 2006, at the San Francisco International Asian American Film Festival. After a year of touring the film festival circuit and winning three Special Jury Prizes, Colma: The Musical was theatrically released on June 22, 2007, through Roadside Attractions and Lions Gate Entertainment.

== Plot ==
In the small town of Colma, a foggy South San Francisco suburb where most of the land consists of cemeteries, Billy, Rodel, and Maribel are three best friends who have just graduated from high school. After Billy decides to audition for a regional musical, he meets college student and potential love interest Tara. Billy's acting aspirations put a strain on his friendships with Rodel and Maribel. Meanwhile, Rodel struggles with coming out of the closet to his conservative single father, and Maribel struggles to figure out what to do with her life after graduation.

== Cast ==
- Jake Moreno as Billy
- H.P. Mendoza as Rodel
- L.A. Renigen as Maribel
- Sigrid Sutter as Tara
- Larry Soriano as Rodel's father
- Brian Raffi as Julio
- Gigi Guizado as Kattia
- Paul Kolsanoff as Kevin
- Allison Torneros as Amanda
- Kat Kneisel as Joanna
- David Scott Keller as Michael

== Production ==
After writing a concept album called Colma: The Musical as a birthday present for a childhood friend, H.P. Mendoza reunited with film school classmate Richard Wong, who had just finished working on the television show Arrested Development and was looking for a script to direct. When Wong listened to a track from Mendoza's album, he prodded him to adapt it into a script. Work on the film began by phone in May 2005; after a first draft of the script was produced in seven days, Mendoza flew from his residence in Philadelphia to San Francisco to make the film. Mendoza loosely based the script on his experiences growing up in Colma.

The film was shot on location on digital video in 18 days. Much of the film was shot in San Francisco's Mission District and Daly City, but filmmakers were able to shoot in Colma when scenes with fog were needed. Wong self-funded the budget of $15,000. Musical scenes were done using one long take. The music for the film was recorded in Wong's garage.

== Release ==
The film premiered at CAAMFest on March 21, 2006, and won the festival's Special Jury Prize for Best Narrative Feature. Wong said, "We played at over 40 film festivals, and I think the fact that it played so much and so many people saw it [generated] a word of mouth that carried it a long way, much longer than we expected." Colma: The Musical was eventually acquired for distribution by Roadside Attractions. The film was given a limited theatrical release on June 22, 2007.

The film was released on DVD on November 20, 2007, by Lionsgate Home Entertainment. The DVD includes deleted scenes and an audio commentary by director Richard Wong and writer H.P. Mendoza.

== Reception ==
On review aggregation website Rotten Tomatoes, Colma: The Musical has an approval rating of 90% based on 31 critics' reviews. The site's critics consensus reads, "Three teens contemplate life after high school while singing their hearts out in this fresh musical."

Manohla Dargis of The New York Times selected the film as a Critic's Pick and called it "an itty-bitty movie with a great big heart [that] is about how we learn to give voice -- joyfully, honestly, loudly -- to the truest parts of ourselves." Dennis Harvey of Variety said the film "has a fresher look and feel than many a big-budget studio production" and "this unexpected delight reps a less pretentious rock musical than 'Hedvig,' with music just as good."

Ruthe Stein of the San Francisco Chronicle said that the film "deserves to be seen for its sheer originality and audacity", and likened the film to American Graffiti and Diner. She also commented that while Rodel's coming out storyline has the potential to become cliche, the "situation is made to seem fresh by the genuine distress Mendoza displays and by Rodel's father's odd combination of strictness and obliqueness." Jurgen Fauth and Marcy Dermansky of About.com wrote, "Colma doesn't deflate or abuse the conventions of the musical; it relies on them to tell three heartbreakingly honest tales about growing up", and commented, "There hasn't been a movie that lays out the confusion and heartbreak of the first tentative steps into adulthood this mercilessly since Ghost World."

Negative reviews came from The Village Voice with Julia Wallace saying "it's unfortunate that Colma pays so little attention to Colma; it may as well be set anywhere".

== Legacy ==
Colma: The Musical acquired a cult following through home video airings and streaming. In honor of the film's tenth anniversary in 2016, CAAMFest hosted a special screening that included a cast-and-crew reunion, an audience sing-along and live performances. In 2019, the Los Angeles Times listed Colma: The Musical as one of the 20 best Asian American films of the last 20 years, calling it a "miraculous microbudget musical" and crediting the film with having "introduced the world to the inventive eye of Wong and the infectious melodies of composer-lyricist-actor Mendoza."

For Asian American and Pacific Islander Heritage Month in 2022, The Criterion Collection streamed 20 Asian American films including Colma: The Musical as part of their Asian American Filmmaking Series.

== Awards and nominations ==
- Special Jury Prize - San Francisco International Asian American Film Festival
- Special Jury Prize - Los Angeles Asian Pacific Film Festival
- Special Jury Prize - San Diego Asian Film Festival
- Gotham Award - Best Film Not in Theaters (Nomination)
- Independent Spirit Award - Someone to Watch Award; Richard Wong (Nomination)

== See also ==
- Fruit Fly (2009), film directed by H.P. Mendoza
