= Come as You Are (2019 film) =

American comedy-drama film

- Directed by: Richard Wong
- Written by: Erik Linthorst
- Produced by: Jacqueline E. Ingram; Grant Rosenmeyer; Barrett Stuart
- Starring: Grant Rosenmeyer; Hayden Szeto; Ravi Patel; Gabourey Sidibe
- Cinematography: Richard Wong
- Edited by: Richard Wong
- Music by: Jeremy Turner
- Production companies: Chicago Media Angels; Florida Hill Entertainment; The Black List
- Distributed by: Samuel Goldwyn Films
- Release dates: March 9, 2019 (South by Southwest); February 14, 2020 (United States)
- Running time: 106 minutes
- Country: United States
- Language: English

Come as You Are is a 2019 American comedy drama film directed by Richard Wong and starring Grant Rosenmeyer, Hayden Szeto, Ravi Patel and Gabourey Sidibe. Produced and financed by Chicago Media Angels and The Blacklist, it is a remake of the 2011 Belgian film Hasta la Vista. The plot concerns three friends who, along with a hired driver, set out for a brothel in Montreal that caters to people with disabilities.

== Plot ==
Scotty, Matt, and Mo befriend each other while attending a physical therapy center. Twentysomething Scotty has been a paraplegic since birth and lives with his overbearing mother Liz. Matt, an Asian-American former athlete, has recently begun using a wheelchair and lives with his parents and sister. Mo, of South Asian ethnicity, is in his 30s and blind. All three men seem resigned to their situations as lifelong virgins, until Scotty learns about a brothel in Montreal that specifically caters to men with disabilities. He persuades Matt and Mo to secretly hire a special needs van and a driver, and the trio sneaks out of their respective homes to hit the road.

The road trip involves various pit stops and misadventures, including a jazz club in Chicago and a run-in with a state trooper. The men, as well as driver Sam, also confront prejudice due to their disabilities and their respective ethnicities. Meanwhile, the men's parents are working together to track down their sons.

== Cast ==
- Grant Rosenmeyer as Scotty
- Hayden Szeto as Matt
- Ravi Patel as Mo
- Gabourey Sidibe as Sam
- Janeane Garofalo as Liz
- C. S. Lee as Roger
- Jennifer Jelsema as Maryanne
- Martha Kuwahara as Jamie
- Daisye Tutor as Becky
- Delaney Feener as Sarah
- Kari Perdue as Jennifer
- Michael Waller as Bobby
- Netta Walker as Claire
- Christian Litke as Drunk Guy
- Marika Engelhardt as Angelique
- Sophie Hoyt as Valerie
- Christine Vrem-Ydstie as Chantal

== Release ==
Come as You Are premiered at the 2019 South by Southwest Film Festival. At the Napa Valley Film Festival it won an Audience Award, and it was an opening night film at SF IndieFest. It received a limited release in the United States on February 14, 2020.

== Reception ==
On the review aggregator website Rotten Tomatoes, the film holds an approval rating of 95% based on 55 reviews, with an average rating of 7.3/10. The website's critics consensus reads: "Come As You Are approaches sensitive subjects with heart and humor, taking audiences on a thoroughly entertaining road trip to a crowd-pleasing destination." On Metacritic, the film has a weighted average score of 71 out of 100, based on 12 critics, indicating "generally favorable" reviews.

G. Allen Johnson of the San Francisco Chronicle said that though the film appears to be a predictable "guys-trying-to-lose-their-virginity" sex comedy, it surprises viewers with its empathy and depth. He wrote, "Crass and confrontational at the outset, Come as You Are achieves a winning sense of vulnerability", adding it "is a funny and moving crowd-pleaser". Writing for The Observer, Wendy Ide said the film "explores its theme of sexuality and disability with admirable candour". The Chicago Sun-Times' Richard Roeper said the film "earns its laughs and tears".

Despite praise for the direction, script, and humor, critics pointed out how the casting of able-bodied actors as disabled characters presented a missed opportunity for the film.

In August 2021, during Edinburgh TV Festival's MacTaggart Lecture, British screenwriter and disability campaigner Jack Thorne cited the film as an example of ableism in the film and television industries, highlighting the lack of disabled actors in the cast.
