= Balance (advertisement) =

TV advertisement for the Lexus LS400

- Champagne glass pyramid on LS 400
- Agency: Team One
- Client: Lexus
- Language: English
- Running time: 30 seconds
- Product: Lexus LS 400
- Release date: 1989 (Television)
- Directed by: Gary Johns
- Music by: Piece of Cake
- Production company: John + Gorman Films
- Produced by: Francesca Cohn

Balance is a 1989 television advertisement for the Lexus LS 400, which also introduced the then-new luxury car make Lexus to American television audiences. It was created by Team One, a unit of Saatchi & Saatchi. The ad was designed to promote the engineering attributes of the LS 400, Lexus's flagship sedan. The advertisement received several awards and was emulated by later versions.

== Synopsis ==
The advertisement shows the Lexus LS 400 on rollers, with a set of champagne glasses stacked on its hood. The LS400 engine and drivetrain were required to quickly accelerate from stop and shift through all the gears to reach the equivalent top speed of over 145 mi (233 km) per hour. Despite the quick shifts and the fast speed, the LS 400 engine produces no vibrations to upset the champagne glass pyramid, and not one drop of liquid is spilled. The narration reads, "After years of intense work, Lexus is ready to celebrate...because even at the equivalent of 145 miles per hour (230 km/h), the Lexus LS 400 is designed to stir the soul...and not much else."

== Reception ==
The Team One advertising campaign for the Lexus launch, including the Balance ad, received a number of advertising awards. Industry publication Adweek named the Balance ad one of its Best Spots of 1990, as listed in a retrospective. The Belding Awards, presented by the Advertising Club of Los Angeles, recognized Team One for their early Lexus campaign. The Balance ad was also challenged by consumer advocate David Horowitz, on his Fight Back! With David Horowitz television program, who suggested that Lexus had staged the advertisement in some way unseen to the audience. In response, Lexus produced a third-party verification videotape, and performed a live demonstration for the studio audience of the same feat, showing that indeed the LS 400 could perform as promised. The stacking of champagne glasses was also used for the formal introduction of the LS 400 at Pebble Beach. In factory, Lexus models use a similar wine glass test.

In 2011, a YouTube video went viral of a Lexus owner failing to recreate the feat on his LS460, and thus claiming that the advertisement was deceptive. Lexus uploaded a rebuttal on their official YouTube channel demonstrating that not only could the feat be recreated on a brand new LS460, but also recreated the feat with a 1990 LS400, and claimed that the viral video's attempt failed because the hood of the sedan was not level - the vehicle's front end hadn't been adequately raised to compensate for the downward slope of the hood.

== Later versions ==
Several car manufacturers referenced the Balance ad in subsequent commercials. In separate instances, Nissan and BMW mentioned the champagne glasses test in their ads. The Nissan ads, designed for the debut of the mass market Nissan Altima in 1993, duplicated the Lexus displays of champagne glasses and ball bearings, and specifically referenced the Lexus advertisements. The BMW ads mocked the champagne glasses test as an unnecessary indicator of performance. In the late 1990s, Lexus added advertisements that focused on fun and entertainment, in addition to engineering precision. The earlier ads were seen as a highly rational appeal. In 2006, Lexus referenced Balance with a new ad for the fourth-generation Lexus LS 460. Titled Pyramid, the ad depicted a driver parking a car between two stacks of champagne glasses using the Advanced Parking Guidance System, a new Lexus automatic parking feature. In 2020, Lexus referenced Balance with a new ad for the fifth-generation Lexus LS 500 h by Akio Toyoda. Titled “Champagne Tower”, the ad depicted a driver parking a car between two stacks of champagne glasses on the bonnet of a brand new LS-500. With the car sitting on a rolling road on a slight incline (to compensate for the slope of the bonnet), Toyoda then fired up the car and drove it to the same speed as in the original commercial, before climbing out and celebrating with a sip.

Hyundai also advertised in Korea to promote Marcia, but instead of using cards. Also, Hyundai using wine glass to promote MOBED, their robot technology in December 2021.

== Credits ==
- Client: Lexus, Rich Anderman
- Agency: Team One, El Segundo, California
- Creative Director: Tom Cordner
- Artistic Director: Kathryn Windley
- Copy Writer: Steve Silver
- Agency Producer: Francesca Cohn
- Production Company. John + Gorman Films
- Director: Gary Johns
- Editor: Steve Wystrach, Wystrach Inc.
- Music: Piece of Cake
- Narrator: James Sloyan
