= Lexus =

Japanese luxury vehicle brand owned by Toyota

- Type: Division
- Industry: Automotive
- Founded: 1989; 37 years ago
- Founder: Eiji Toyoda
- Headquarters: Toyota City, Aichi, Japan
- Area served: Worldwide
- Key people: Takashi Watanabe (president); David Nordstrom (VP, Asia Pacific); Spiros Fotinos (VP, EU); Andrew Gilleland (VP, U.S.)
- Products: Luxury vehicles; Performance vehicles
- Brands: F marque
- Services: Automotive financing
- Parent: Toyota Motor Corporation
- Website: discoverlexus.com

Lexus (Japanese: レクサス, Hepburn: Rekusasu) is the luxury vehicle division of the Japanese automaker Toyota Motor Corporation. The Lexus brand is marketed in more than 90 countries and territories worldwide and is Japan's largest-selling make of premium cars. It has ranked among the 10 largest Japanese global brands in market value. Lexus has been headquartered in Shimoyama, Aichi, in Japan since 2024. Operational centers are located in Brussels, Belgium, and Plano, Texas, United States.

Created about the same time that Japanese rivals Honda and Nissan created their Acura and Infiniti luxury divisions respectively, Lexus originated from a corporate project to develop a new premium sedan, code-named F1, which began in 1983 and culminated in the launch of the Lexus LS in 1989. Subsequently, the division added sedan, coupé, convertible and SUV models. Lexus did not exist as a brand in its home market until 2005, and all vehicles marketed internationally as Lexus from 1989 to 2005 were released in Japan under the Toyota marque and an equivalent model name. In 2005, a hybrid version of the RX crossover debuted and additional hybrid models later joined the division's lineup. Lexus launched its own F marque performance division in 2007 with the debut of the IS F sport sedan, followed by the LFA supercar in 2009.

Lexus vehicles are largely produced in Japan, with manufacturing centered in the Chūbu and Kyūshū regions, and in particular at Toyota's Tahara, Aichi, Chūbu and Miyata, Fukuoka, Kyūshū plants. Assembly of the first Lexus produced outside the country, the Canadian-built RX 330, began in 2003. Following a corporate reorganization from 2001 to 2005, Lexus began operating its own design, engineering and manufacturing centers.

Since the 2000s, Lexus has increased sales outside its largest market, the United States. The division inaugurated dealerships in the Japanese domestic market in 2005, becoming the first Japanese premium car marque to launch in its country of origin. The brand has since debuted in Southeast Asia, Latin America, Europe and other regions, and has introduced hybrid vehicles in many markets.

== History ==
=== 1980s: The F1 project ===
The Lexus brand was created around the same time as Japanese rivals Nissan and Honda developed their Infiniti and Acura premium brands. The Japanese government imposed voluntary export restraints for the U.S. market, so it was more profitable for Japanese automakers to export more expensive cars to the U.S.

In 1983, Toyota chairman Eiji Toyoda issued a challenge to build the world's best car. The project, code-named F1 ("Flagship One") developed the Lexus LS 400 to expand Toyota's product line in the premium segment. The F1 project followed the Toyota Supra sports car and the premium Toyota Mark II models. Both the Supra and Mark II were rear-wheel drive cars with a powerful 7M-GE or 7M-GTE inline-six engine. The largest sedan Toyota built at the time was the limited-production, 1960s-vintage Toyota Century, a domestic, hand-built limousine, and V8-powered model, followed by the inline-six-engined Toyota Crown premium sedan. The Century was conservatively styled for the Japanese market and along with the Crown not slated for export after a restyle in 1982. The F1 designers targeted their new sedan at international markets and began development on a new V8 engine.

Japanese manufacturers exported more expensive models in the 1980s due to voluntary export restraints negotiated by the Japanese government and U.S. trade representatives that restricted mainstream car sales. In 1986, Honda launched its Acura marque in the U.S., influencing Toyota's plans for a luxury division. The initial Acura model was an export version of the Honda Legend, called the Acura Legend, itself launched in Japan in 1985 as a rival to the Toyota Crown, Nissan Cedric/Gloria and Mazda Luce. In 1987, Nissan unveiled its plans for a premium brand, Infiniti, and revised its Nissan President sedan in standard wheelbase form for export as the Infiniti Q45, which it launched in 1990. Mazda began selling the Luce as the Mazda 929 in North America in 1988 and later began plans to develop an upscale marque to be called Amati, but its plans did not come to fruition.

Toyota researchers visited the U.S. in May 1985 to conduct focus groups and market research on luxury consumers. During that time, several F1 designers rented a home in Laguna Beach, California, to observe the lifestyles and tastes of American upper class consumers. Meanwhile, F1 engineering teams conducted prototype testing on locations ranging from the German autobahn to U.S. roads. Toyota's market research concluded that a separate brand and sales channel were needed to present its new sedan, and plans were made to develop a new network of dealerships in the U.S. market.

==== Brand development ====
In 1986, Toyota's longtime advertising agency Saatchi & Saatchi formed a specialized unit, Team One, to handle marketing for the new brand. Image consulting firm Lippincott & Margulies was hired to develop a list of 219 prospective names; Vectre, Verone, Chaparel, Calibre and Alexis were chosen as top candidates. While Alexis quickly became the front runner, concerns were raised that the name applied to people more than cars (being associated with the Alexis Carrington character on the popular 1980s prime time drama Dynasty). As a result, the first letter was removed and the "i" replaced with a "u" to morph the name to Lexus.

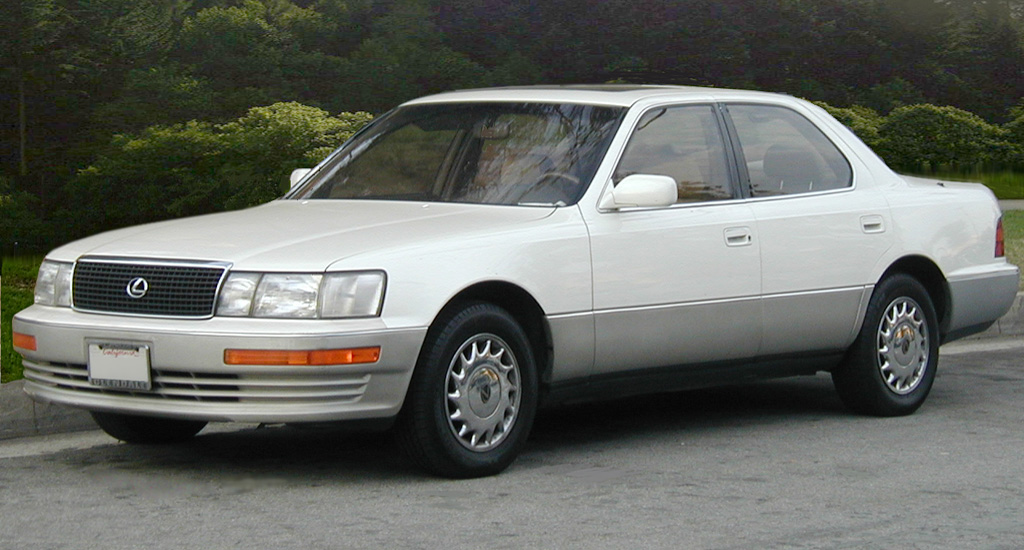
1989 LS 400 sedan was the first Lexus model.

Theories of the etymology of the Lexus name have suggested it is the combination of the words "luxury" and "elegance", and that it is an acronym for "luxury exports to the U.S." According to Team One interviews, the brand name has no specific meaning and simply evokes a luxurious and technological image. Prior to the release of the first vehicles, database service LexisNexis obtained a temporary injunction forbidding the name Lexus from being used because it might cause product confusion. The injunction threatened to delay the division's launch and marketing efforts. The U.S. appeals court lifted the injunction, deciding that there was little likelihood of confusion between the two products.

The original Lexus slogan, developed after Team One representatives visited Lexus designers in Japan and noted an obsessive attention to detail, became "The Relentless Pursuit of Perfection." Three firms were involved in the final phase of logo development: Saatchi & Saatchi, Molly Designs and Hunter/Korobkin, Inc. The finished logo was a combination of two firms' final designs: the Lexus logo typeface came from Saatchi & Saatchi and the "L" was Hunter/Korobkin, Inc.'s design. According to Toyota, the automaker made some refinements so the logo would be easier to manufacture, rendering it using a mathematical formula. The first teaser ads featuring the Lexus name and logo appeared at the Chicago, Los Angeles and New York auto shows in 1988.

==== Launch ====
The F1 project was completed in 1989, involving 60 designers, 24 engineering teams, 1,400 engineers, 2,300 technicians, 220 support workers, approximately 450 prototypes and more than $1 billion in costs. The resulting car, the Lexus LS 400, had a design that shared no major elements with previous Toyota vehicles, with a new 4.0 L V8 gasoline engine and rear-wheel drive. The car debuted in January 1989 at the North American International Auto Show in Detroit and official sales of the vehicle began the following September at a network of 81 new Lexus dealerships in the U.S. The LS 400 was sold along with the smaller ES 250, a rebadged version of the Japanese market Toyota Camry Prominent/Toyota Vista. The launch of Lexus was accompanied by a multimillion-dollar advertising campaign.

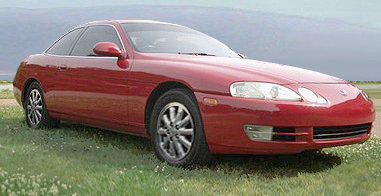
1991 SC 400 was the third Lexus model and first coupe.

The LS 400 was praised for its quietness, well-appointed and ergonomic interior, engine performance, build quality, aerodynamics, fuel economy and value. However, it was criticized by some automobile columnists for derivative styling and a suspension regarded as too compromising of handling for ride comfort. In some markets it was priced against mid-size, six-cylinder Mercedes-Benz and BMW models. It was rated by Car and Driver magazine as better than the higher-priced Mercedes-Benz 420 SEL and BMW 735i in terms of ride, handling and performance. The LS 400 also won motoring awards from automotive publications including Automobile Magazine and Wheels Magazine. Lexus quickly established customer loyalty and its debut was generally regarded as a shock to existing luxury marques. BMW's and Mercedes-Benz's U.S. sales figures dropped 29 percent and 19 percent, respectively, with BMW executives accusing Lexus of dumping in that market, while 35 percent of Lexus buyers traded in a Lincoln or Cadillac.

In December 1989, Lexus initiated a voluntary recall of all 8,000 LS 400s based upon two customer complaints over defective wiring and an overheated brake light. A 20-day operation to replace the parts on affected vehicles included technicians to pick up, repair and return cars to customers free of charge, and also flying personnel and renting garage space for owners in remote locations. This response was covered in media publications and helped establish the marque's early reputation for customer service.

By the end of 1989, a total of 16,392 LS 400 and ES 250 sedans were sold in the four months following the U.S. launch. Although sales had begun at a slower pace than expected, the final tally matched the division's target of 16,000 units for that year. Following initial models, plans called for the addition of a sports coupe along with a redesigned ES sedan.

=== 1990s: Growth and expansion ===
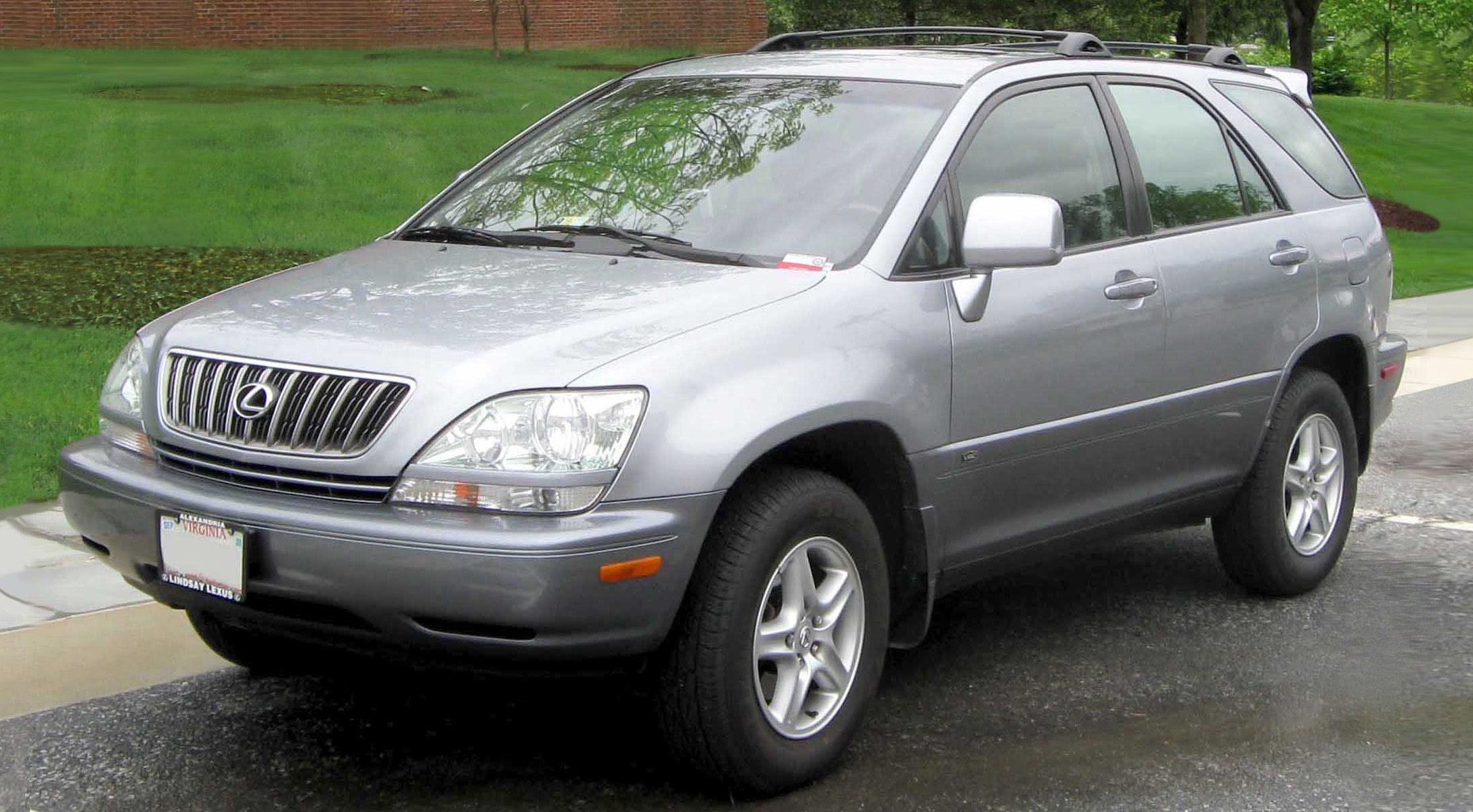
1998 RX 300, first Lexus crossover SUV

In 1990, during its first full year of sales, Lexus sold 63,594 LS 400 and ES 250 sedans in the U.S., the majority being the LS model. That year, Lexus also began limited exports to the United Kingdom, Switzerland, Canada and Australia. In 1991, Lexus launched its first sports coupe, the SC 400, which shared the LS 400s V8 engine and rear-wheel drive design. This was followed by the second generation ES 300 sedan, which succeeded the ES 250 and became Lexus' top seller. At the conclusion of 1991, Lexus had become the top-selling premium car import in the U.S., with sales reaching 71,206 vehicles. That year, Lexus ranked highest in J.D. Power and Associates' studies on initial vehicle quality, customer satisfaction and sales satisfaction for the first time. The marque also began increasing U.S. model prices past those of comparable American premium makes, but still below high-end European models. By 1992, the LS 400's base price had risen 18 percent.

In 1993, Lexus launched the mid-size GS 300 sports sedan, based on the Toyota Aristo using the Toyota "S" platform from the Toyota Crown, which had sold for two years prior in Japan. The GS 300 was priced below the LS 400 in the marque's lineup. That same year, Lexus became one of the first marques to debut a certified pre-owned program, with the aim of improving trade-in model values. The marque introduced the second generation LS 400 in 1994. In May 1995, sales were threatened by the U.S. government's proposal of 100 percent tariffs on upscale Japanese cars in response to the widening U.S.-Japan trade deficit. SUVs were exempt from the proposed sanctions. Normal sales operations resumed by late 1995 when the Japanese auto manufacturers collectively agreed to greater American investments and the tariffs were not enacted.

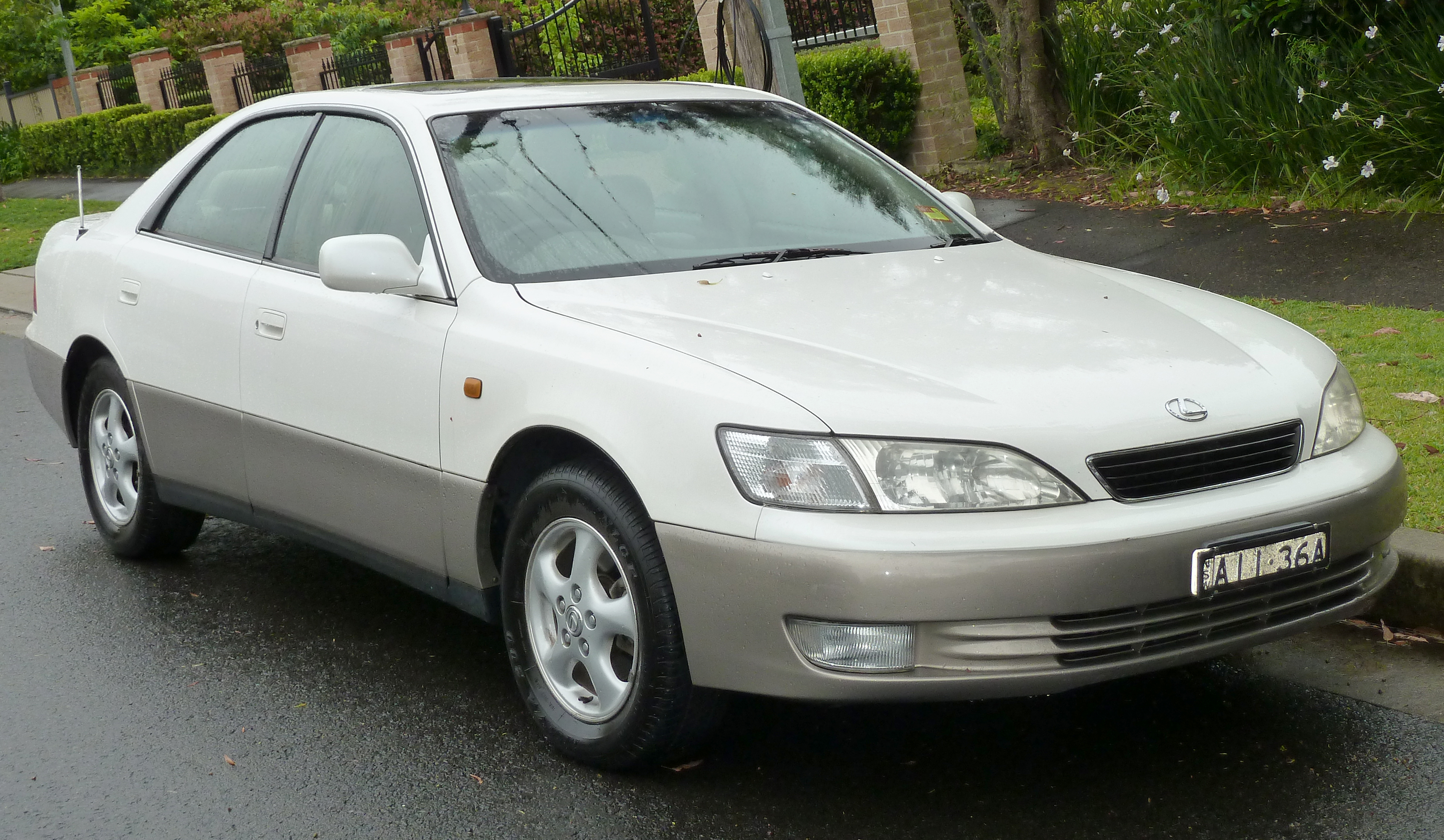
ES 300 was the best-selling Lexus sedan in the 1990s.

In 1996, Lexus debuted its first sport utility vehicle, the LX 450, followed by the third generation ES 300 sedan, and the second generation GS 300 and GS 400 sedans in 1997. The marque's plans for developing an SUV model had accelerated during the U.S.-Japan tariff discussions of 1995. Lexus added the first luxury-branded crossover SUV, the RX 300 in 1998. The RX crossover targeted suburban buyers who desired an upmarket SUV but did not need the LX's off-road capability. It was particularly successful, eventually becoming the marque's top-selling model ahead of the ES sedan. The same year, Lexus made its debut in South America's most populous country when it launched sales in Brazil. In 1999, the IS was introduced, an entry-level sport sedan. Lexus also recorded its 1 millionth vehicle sold in the U.S. market, being ranked as the top-selling premium car maker in the U.S. overall.

=== 2000s: Global reorganization ===
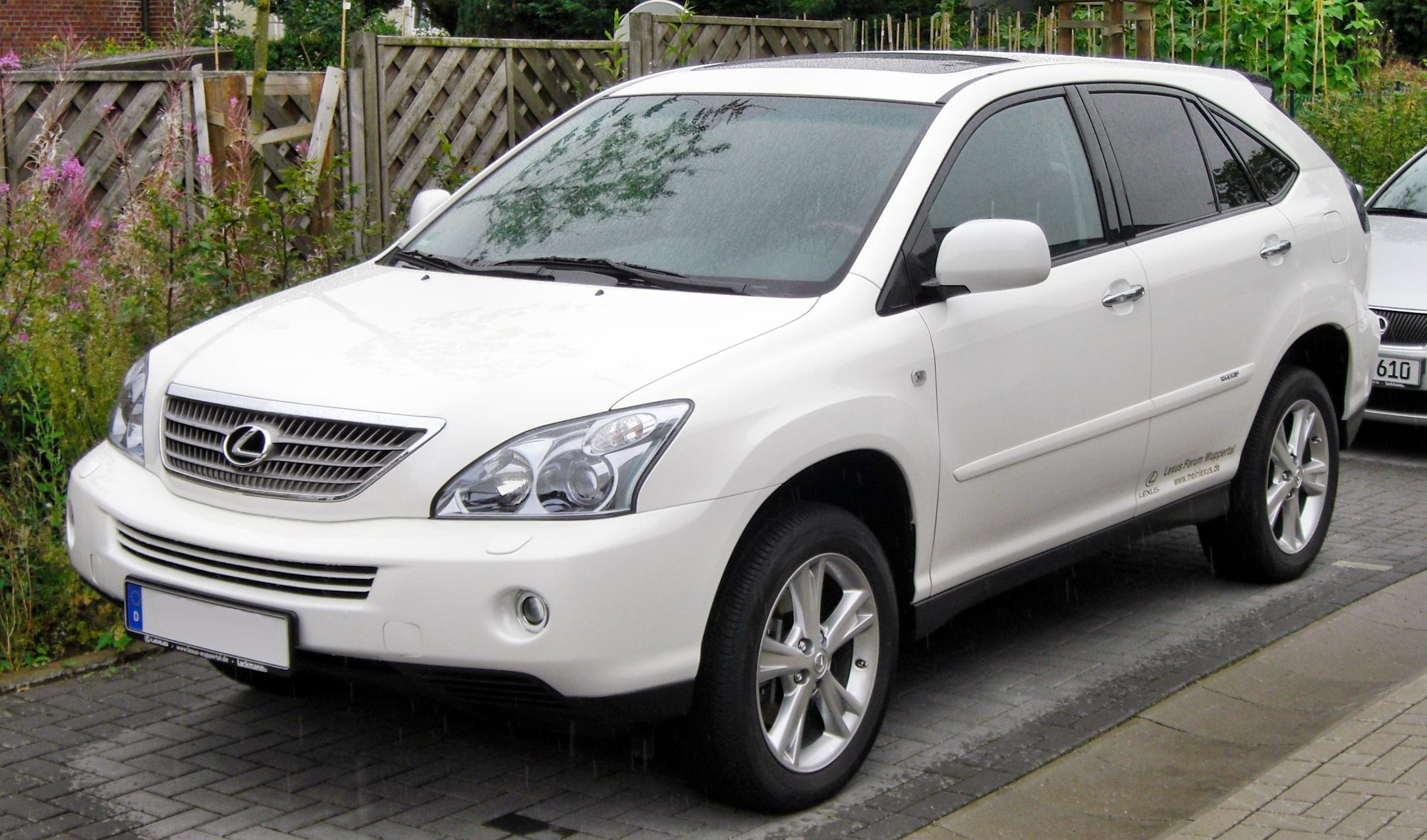
2004 RX 400h, first hybrid version of Lexus' best-selling vehicle

In July 2000, Lexus introduced the IS 300 in North America, following global launch in 1999 (as the IS 200) and the third generation LS 430. In 2001, the first convertible was introduced, as well as the SC 430 and a redesigned ES 300. The GX 470 mid-size SUV debuted in 2002, followed by the second generation RX 330 in 2003. The following year, Lexus recorded its 2 millionth U.S. vehicle sale, and the first luxury-branded production hybrid SUV, the RX 400h. This vehicle used Toyota's Hybrid Synergy Drive system that combined gasoline and electric motors.

In 2005, Lexus completed an organizational separation from parent company Toyota, with dedicated design, engineering, training, and manufacturing centers working exclusively for the division. This effort coincided with Lexus' launch in its home market of Japan and an expanded global launch of the brand in markets such as China. Executives aimed to increase Lexus sales outside of its largest market in the U.S. To accompany this expansion, next generation Lexus vehicles were redesigned as "global models" for international release. In the European market, where Lexus had long faced struggling sales owing to low brand recognition, few dedicated dealerships, and 1990s import quotas, the marque announced plans to introduce hybrid and diesel powertrains, increase the number of Lexus dealerships, and expand operations in emerging markets such as Russia.

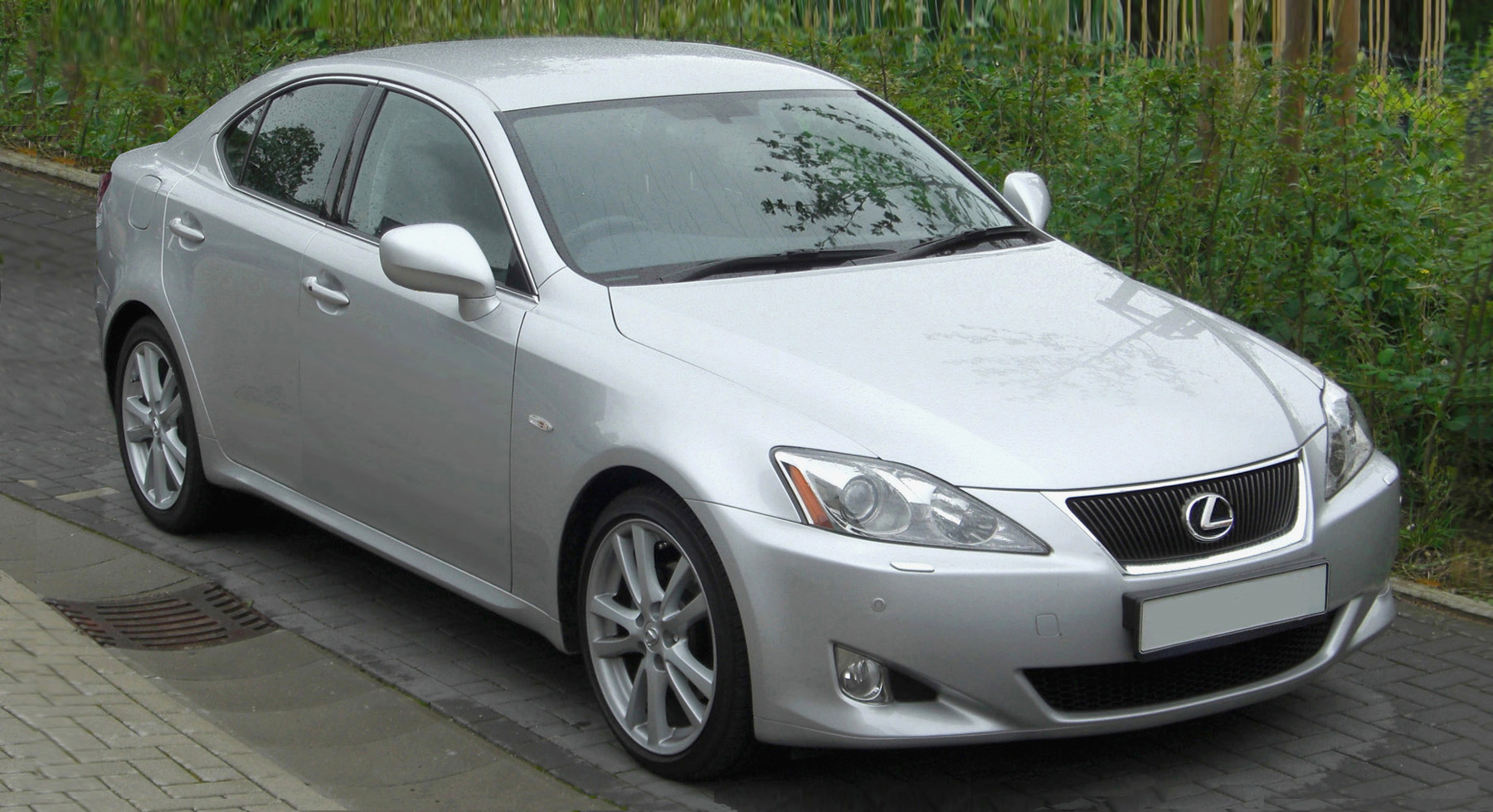
2006 Lexus IS, second generation with F marque variant in 2007

Lexus' arrival in the Japanese market in July 2005 marked the first introduction of a Japanese premium car marque in the domestic market. New generation LS, IS, ES, GS, and RX models subsequently became available in Japan along with the SC 430, ending domestic sales of Toyota-branded models under the Celsior, Altezza, Windom, Aristo, Harrier, and Soarer nameplates, respectively. The Altezza and Aristo were previously exclusive to Japanese Toyota retail sales channels called Toyota Vista Store, the Windom was exclusive to Toyota Corolla Store, the Celsior and Harrier were exclusive to Toyopet Store, and the Soarer was previously available at both Toyota Store and Toyopet Store locations. Lexus models sold in Japan featured higher specifications and a price premium compared with their discontinued Toyota counterparts. Sales for the first half-year were slower than expected, affected by the contraction of the domestic auto market and price increases, but improved in subsequent months with an expanded lineup.

Through the mid-2000s, Lexus experienced sales successes in South Korea and Taiwan, becoming the top-selling import make in both markets in 2005; the marque also sold well in the Middle East, where it ranked first or second among rivals in multiple countries, and in Australia, where Lexus reached third in luxury car sales in 2006. Division executives in 2006 announced an expansion goal from 68 countries to 76 worldwide by 2010. By the end of the decade, this expansion resulted in official launches in Malaysia and South Africa in 2006, Indonesia in 2007, Chile in 2008, and the Philippines in 2009.

==== Hybrids and F models ====
In 2006, Lexus began sales of the GS 450h, a V6 hybrid performance sedan, and launched the fourth generation LS line, comprising both standard- and long-wheelbase V8 (LS 460 and LS 460 L) and hybrid (LS 600h and LS 600h L) versions. The fifth generation ES 350 also debuted in the same year. The LS 600h L subsequently went on sale as the most expensive sedan ever produced in Japan. By the end of 2006, Lexus' annual sales had reached 475,000 vehicles worldwide. In January 2007, Lexus announced a new F marque performance division, which would produce racing-inspired versions of its performance models. The IS F, made its debut at the 2007 North American International Auto Show, accompanied by a concept car, the LF-A.

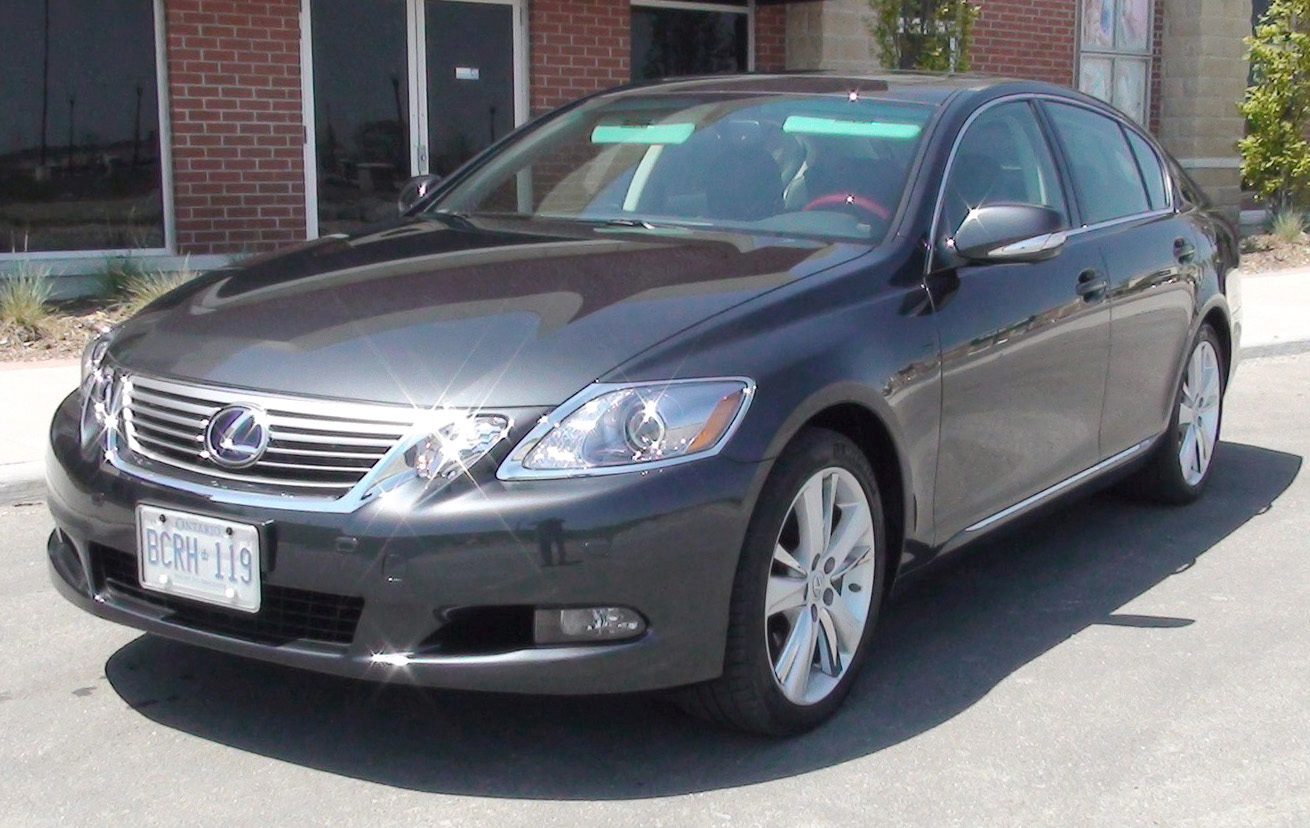
2006 GS 450h, first rear-wheel-drive hybrid

In October 2007, Lexus entered the Specialty Equipment Market Association show in the U.S. for the first time with the IS F, and announced its F-Sport performance trim level and factory-sanctioned accessory line. Increased emphasis on sporty models was an effort to target rivals from Mercedes-Benz's AMG and BMW's M divisions. While models such as the SC 400 and GS 400 had received favorable reactions from sport luxury buyers, most Lexus models had been characterized as favoring comfort over sporty road feel and handling, compared with European rivals. By the end of 2007, Lexus annual worldwide sales had surpassed 500,000 vehicles, and the marque ranked as the top-selling premium import in China for the first time. The largest sales markets in order of size for 2007 were the U.S., Japan, the UK, China, Canada, and Russia.

In 2008, amidst the late-2000s recession and a weakened world car market, global sales fell 16 percent to 435,000, with declines in markets such as the U.S. and Europe where deliveries fell by 21 percent and 27.5 percent, respectively. In 2009, the marque launched the HS 250h, a dedicated hybrid sedan for North America and Japan, the RX 450h, the second generation hybrid SUV replacing the earlier RX 400h, and later that year debuted the US$375,000 production LFA exotic coupe. In late 2009, citing higher sales of hybrid models over their petrol counterparts, Lexus announced plans to become a hybrid-only marque in Europe. By the end of the decade, Lexus ranked as the fourth-largest premium car make in the world by volume, and was the number one selling premium car marque in the U.S. for 10 consecutive years.

=== 2010s ===
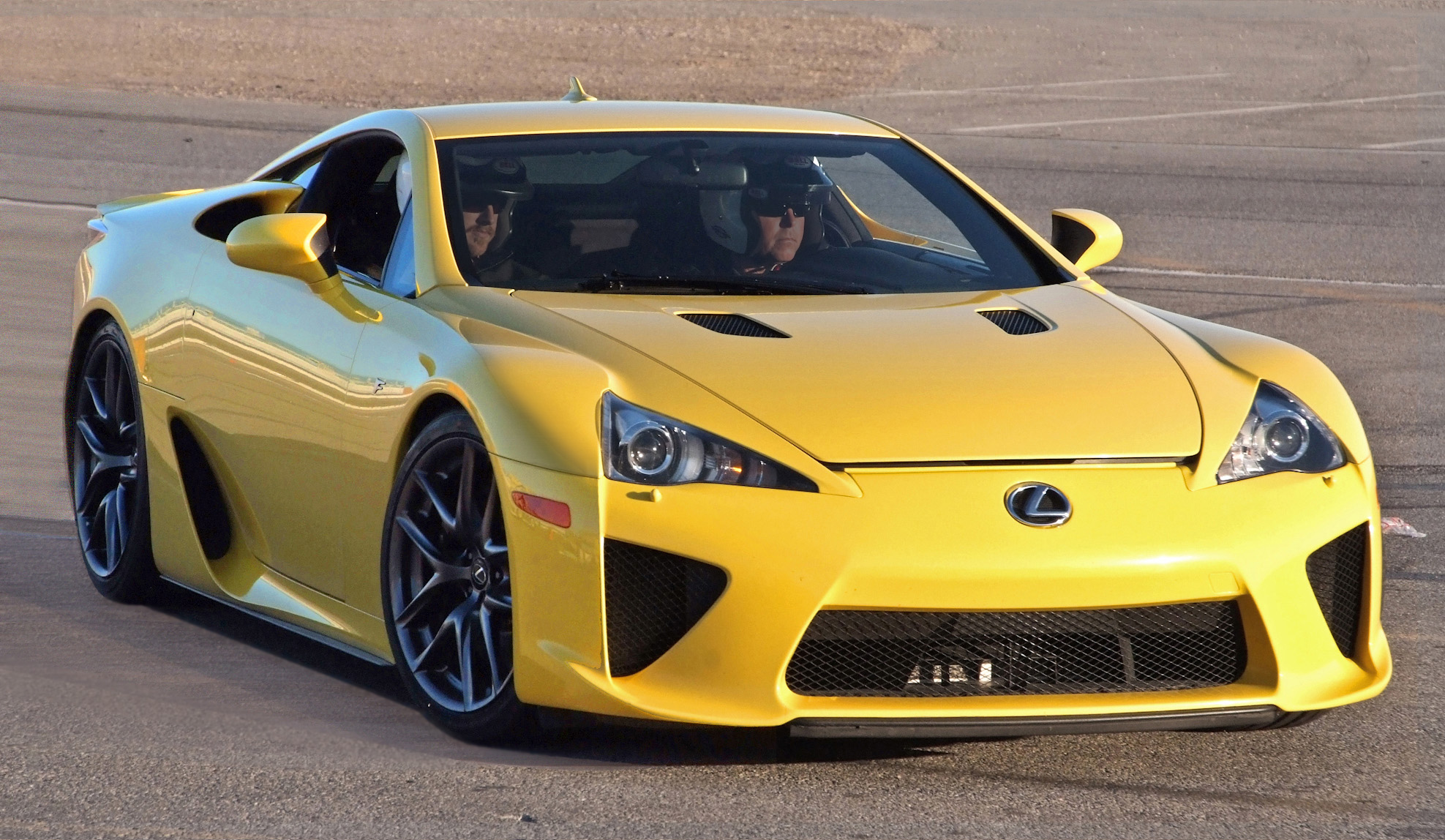
2012 Lexus LFA

In 2010, Lexus underwent a gradual sales recovery in North America and Asia as the marque focused on adding hybrids and new model derivatives. Sales in the U.S. held steady despite the 2009–2010 Toyota vehicle recalls, several of which included Lexus models. The ES 350 and certain IS models were affected by a recall for potentially jamming floor mats, while parent company Toyota bore the brunt of negative publicity amid investigations over its series of product recalls and problem rates per-vehicle. The redesigned GX 460 was also voluntarily recalled in April 2010 for a software update, one week after Consumer Reports issued a recommendation not to buy the SUV, citing a possible rollover risk following the slow stability control response to a high-speed emergency turn. Although the publication knew of no reported incidents, the GX 460 received updated stability control software.

In late 2010 and early 2011, Lexus began sales of the CT 200h, a compact four-door hybrid hatchback designed for Europe, in multiple markets. Sales of lower-displacement regional models were also expanded, beginning with the ES 240 in China followed by the RX 270; Japan, Russia, and Taiwan were among markets which received model variants intended for reduced emissions or import taxes. In March 2011, the Tōhoku earthquake and tsunami caused severe disruption to Lexus' Japan-based production lines, hindering the marque's near-term sales prospects. Lexus' U.S. executives stated that due to vehicle shortages amidst close competition from BMW, Mercedes-Benz, and Audi, the marque would not remain the country's top-selling premium car brand.

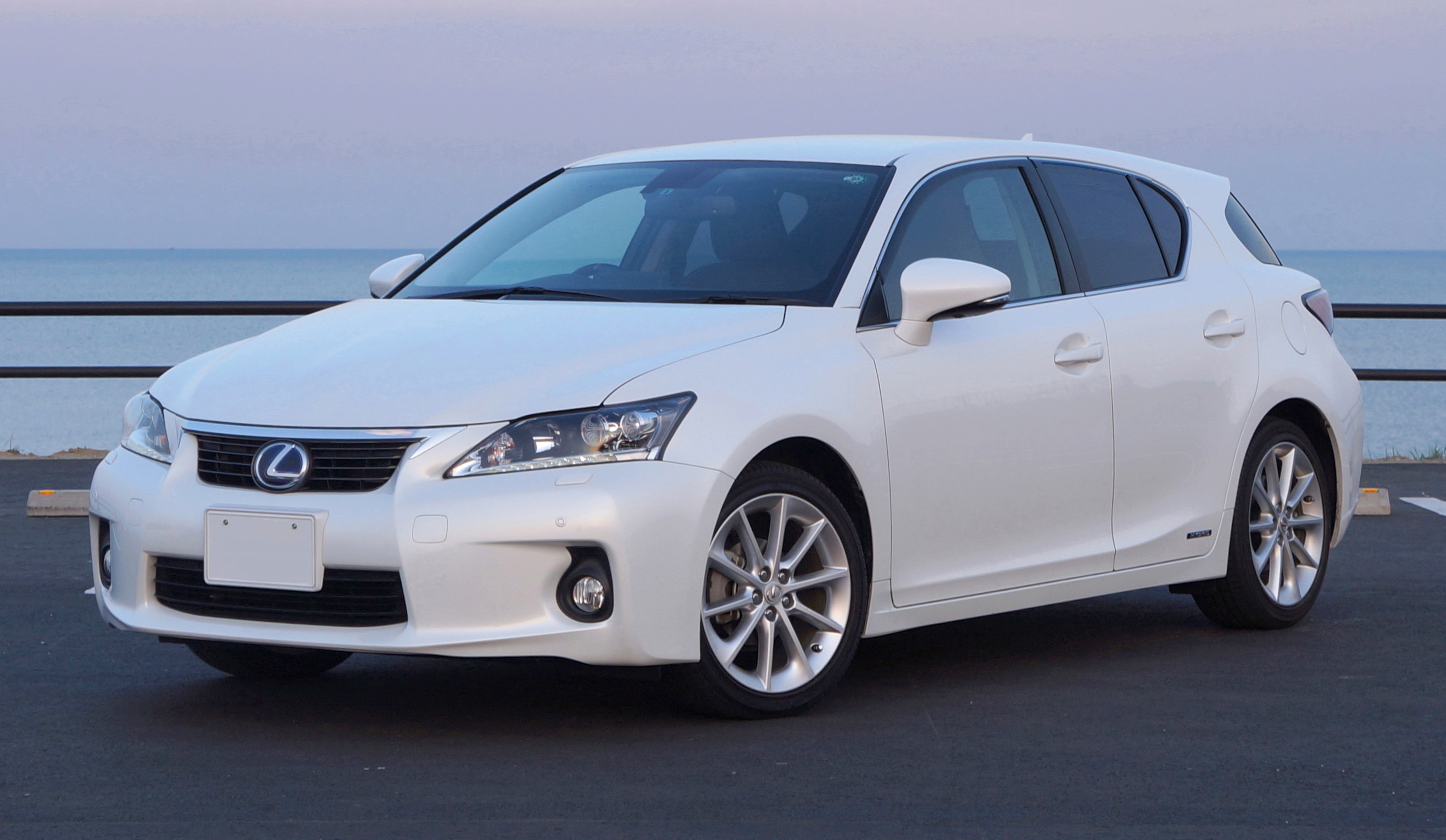
2010 CT 200h, first Lexus hatchback

Cumulative sales results for 2011 indicated a 14 percent sales drop in the U.S. market, along with sales increases of 40 percent and 27 percent in Europe and Japan respectively, for a global sales total of 410,000 units. Lexus' streak of 11 consecutive years as the best-selling luxury marque in the U.S. ended that year, with the title going to BMW followed by Mercedes-Benz. While 45 percent of Lexus sales in the U.S. in 2011 relied upon the RX luxury crossover SUV, rival Mercedes-Benz's best-selling offering was the E-Class mid-luxury sedan, which commands considerably higher prices. Subsequently, Toyota chairman Akio Toyoda vowed to restore passion to the marque and further increase its organizational independence, admitting that "...back then we did not regard Lexus as a brand, but as a distribution channel". As a result of Toyoda's organizational changes, Lexus senior managers report directly to the chairman for the first time in the marque's history.

In January 2012, the marque began sales of the fourth generation GS line, including GS 350 and GS 450h variants, as well as a lower-displacement GS 250 model for select markets. In April 2012, the sixth generation ES line, including ES 350 and ES 300h variants, debuted at the New York International Auto Show.

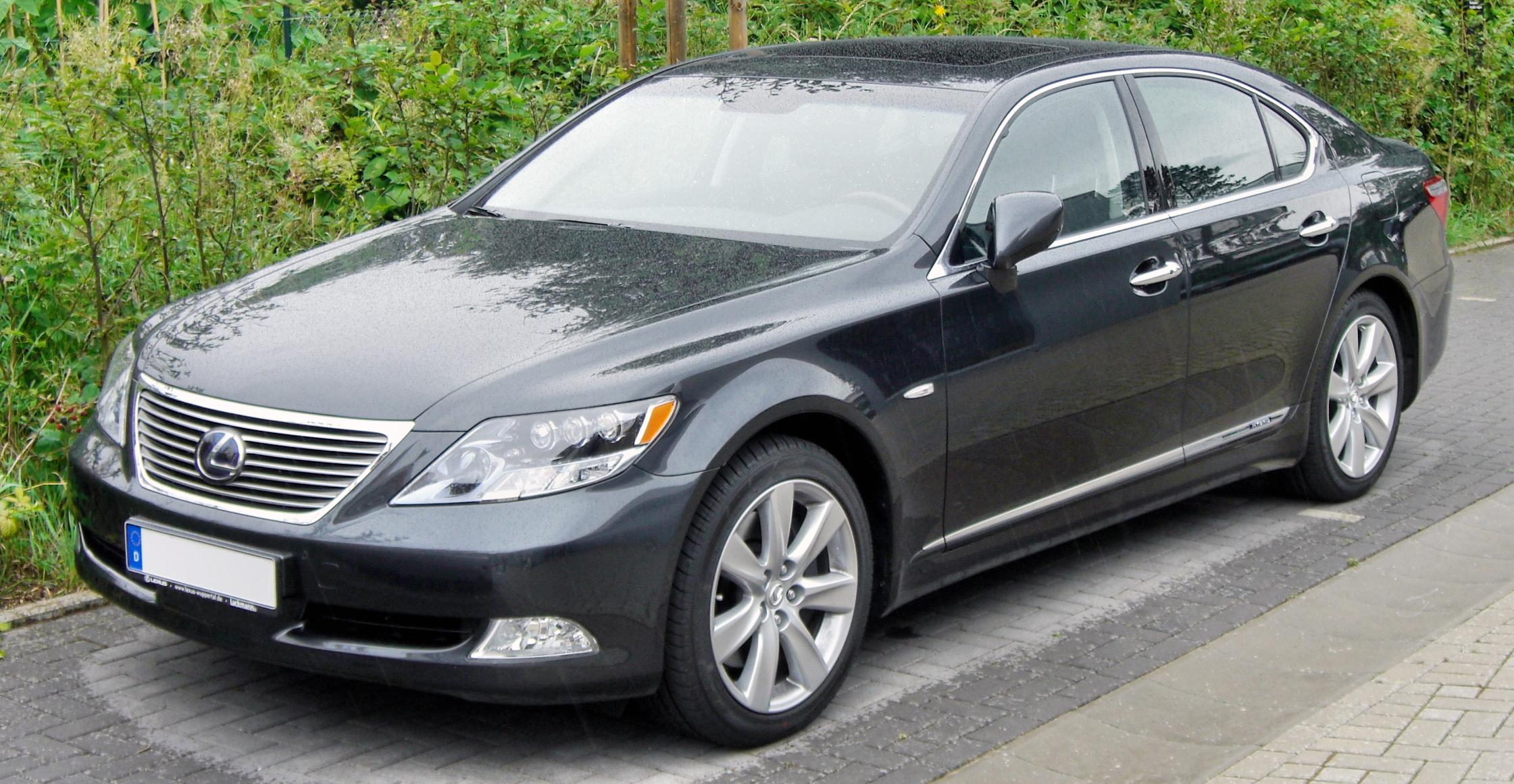
The fourth-generation LS’ production of eleven years made it the longest running single-generation Lexus.

In April 2014, Lexus unveiled the five-seater NX crossover. The vehicle features a very first for a Lexus vehicle: a turbocharger. Its nomenclature is denoted as the 200t. In August 2014, Toyota announced it would be cutting its Lexus spare parts prices in China by up to 35 percent. The company admitted the move was in response to a probe foreshadowed earlier in the month by China's National Development and Reform Commission of Lexus spare parts policies, as part of an industry-wide investigation into what the Chinese regulator considers exorbitantly high prices being charged by automakers for spare parts and after-sales servicing.

In March 2016, Lexus announced that it will be producing a new flagship vehicle: the two-door LC 500. The vehicle will be produced for late 2017 in a V8 version putting out 467 horsepower. The LC 500h, a V6 hybrid variant, could potentially become available in late 2017 or early 2018.

In April 2019, Lexus announced that a rebadged limousine version of the third-generation Toyota Alphard would be sold as the Lexus LM. It was also announced that Lexus would finally enter the market in Mexico in 2021 with some of the vehicles in their lineup. In October 2019, Lexus announced that it will be launching the brand's first all-battery electric vehicle in 2020, which is the UX 300e. In June 2023, Lexus introduced its first vehicle in the B-segment, the LBX, which went on sale in Europe, Japan, Australia and Southeast Asia.

=== 2020s ===
As with many other automakers, Lexus has capitalized on changes in the car market by shifting production towards focusing more on SUVs and crossovers than on other vehicle body styles. This transition occurred as early as 2020. As of 2026, out of a total Lexus production lineup of 13 models, 9 of its vehicles fall into the broader crossover/SUV category. These are, from smallest to largest body size, the Lexus LBX, Lexus UX, Lexus NX, Lexus RZ, Lexus RX, Lexus TZ, Lexus TX, Lexus GX, and Lexus LX.

== Corporate affairs ==
Total sales and production
Regional sales, 2011	Units
Japan	42,365
China	56,303
Europe	43,637
United States	198,552
Type production, 2010	Units
Passenger vehicles	205,070
Crossover SUVs	159,560
Hybrid vehicles	66,226
Line production, 2010	Units
Japan production	283,012
Canada production	81,618
Total	364,630

=== Operations ===
Lexus International coordinates the worldwide operations of Toyota's luxury division from the brand's global headquarters, located in Nagoya, Aichi. Corporate entities further include the brand's Japan Sales and Marketing and global Product and Marketing Planning divisions. While organizationally separate from its parent company, Lexus International reports directly to Toyota chief executive officer Akio Toyoda. In the U.S., brand operations are managed by the U.S. Lexus division, which is headquartered in Plano, Texas. In Europe, Lexus operations are managed by Lexus Europe, located in Brussels. Companion design facilities are located in Southern California and central Japan, with the head design studio devoted entirely to Lexus models in Toyota City, Aichi.

Lexus sales operations vary in structure by region. In many markets, such as the U.S., the dealership network is a distinct organization from corporate headquarters, with separately owned and operated Lexus showrooms. By contrast, in Japan all 143 dealerships in the country are owned and operated by Lexus. Several markets have a designated, third party regional distributor; for example, in the United Arab Emirates, sales operations are managed by Al-Futtaim Motors LLC, and in Costa Rica, Lexus vehicles are sold via regional distributor Purdy Motors S.A. Other officially sanctioned regional distributors have sold Lexus models prior to the launch of, or in absence of, a dedicated dealership network.

The Lexus brand launched in the Indian market in 2017, with the models RX450h, LX450d, LX570, ES300h, NX, LS. Dealerships in Mumbai, Delhi, Gurgaon, and Bengaluru became operational in March 2017, when the brand began sales in India with a second set of dealerships opening in Chandigarh, Kochi, and Chennai toward the end of 2017. This made Lexus the fifth luxury brand to be launched in India, after Mercedes-Benz, Porsche, BMW, and Audi.

=== Sales ===
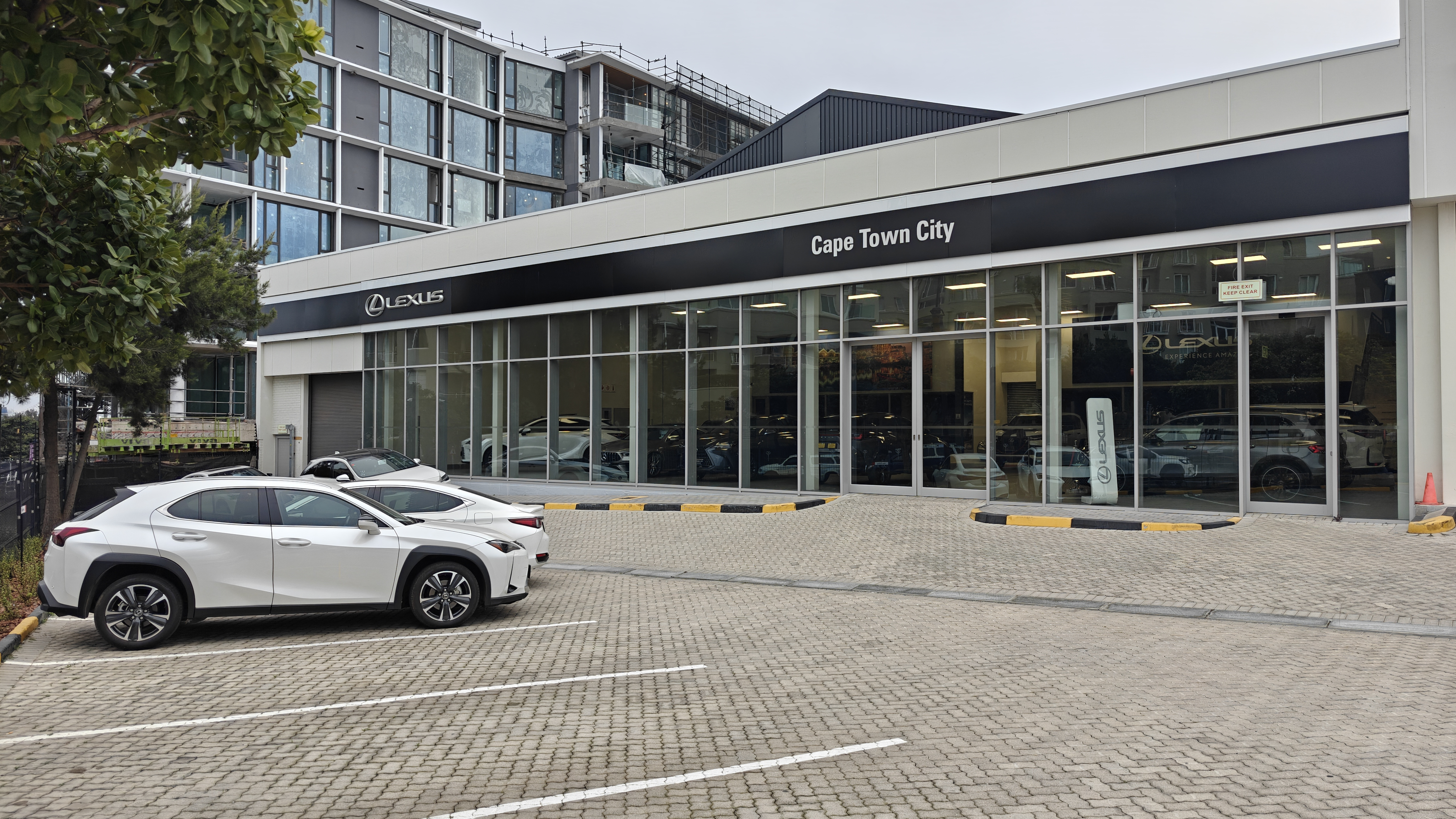
Lexus Cape Town dealership

Global sales of Lexus vehicles reached an all-time high in 2007, with a total of 518,000. Sales decreased in subsequent years due to the effects of the 2008 recession and the Japanese tsunami of 2011. Following this, sales recovered and reached a new high of 523,000 in 2013.

In 2014, the Lexus brand set a new global sales record after selling 582,000 vehicles. This made Lexus the fourth best selling luxury brand in the world, trailing BMW, Audi and Mercedes-Benz.

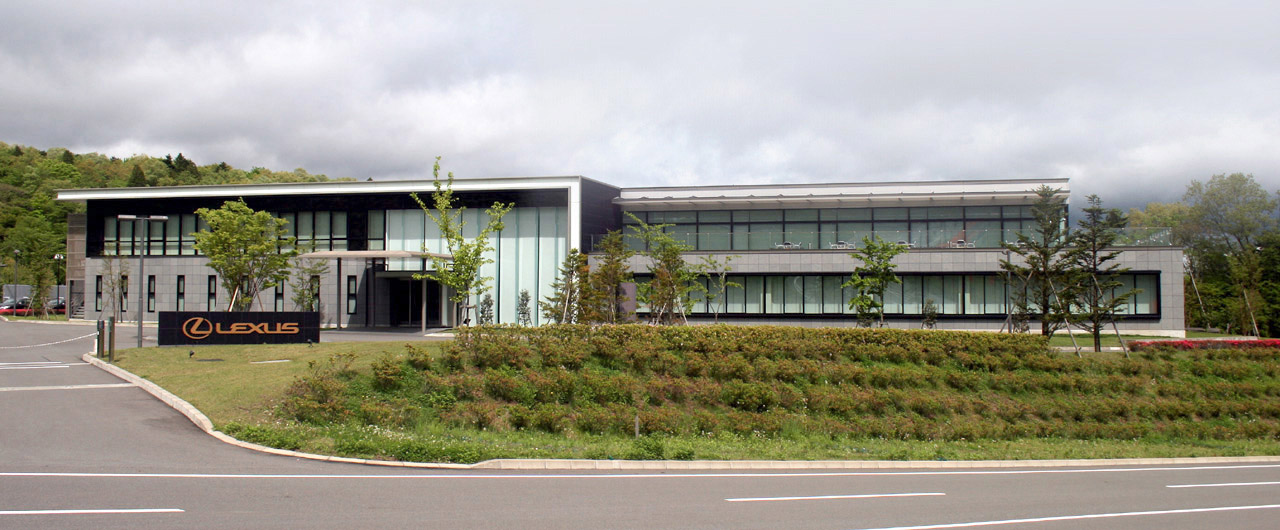
Fuji Lexus College, training facility for dealers in Shizuoka, Japan

Global sales of Lexus vehicles increased by 12 percent in 2015 to reach another annual sales record with 652,000 units sold worldwide.

Global cumulative sales of Lexus brand hybrid electric cars reached the 500,000 mark in November 2012. The 1 million sales milestone was achieved in March 2016. The Lexus RX 400h/RX 450h ranks as the top selling Lexus hybrid with 335,000 units delivered worldwide as of March 2016, followed by the Lexus CT 200h with 267,000 units.

Lexus has not sold as well in Europe as it has in the rest of the world where it is marketed. This is allegedly due to suffering from smaller brand recognition, image, and a less-developed dealership network. In European markets, the Lexus LS has ranked behind BMW, Mercedes-Benz, Audi, and Jaguar in flagship luxury car sales. Automotive analysts have suggested a possible rationale for the sales disparity, in that European buyers place less emphasis on vehicle reliability and have more brand loyalty to established domestic marques. In contrast, the Lexus LS has ranked second in sales to the Mercedes-Benz S-Class (and ahead of rivals from BMW, Audi, and Jaguar) in markets outside Europe, such as South Africa.

Currently all of Lexus's models for the US market are imported from Japan, with the exception of the RX and NX, which are also produced in Cambridge, Ontario, for North America, and the ES, which is also produced in Georgetown, Kentucky. The RX midsized crossover is Lexus's best selling model in the United States, while the ES mid-sized car is the most popular sedan in the line-up.

Calendar Year	Europe	US (Market share %)
2023	-	▲320,249 (▲2.06)
2022	38,366	▼258,434 (▼1.89)
2021	46,250	▲326,928 (▲2.19)
2020	47,041	▼275,042 (▲1.87)
2019	55,770	▼298,112 (▲1.75)
2018	45,918	▼298,302 (▼1.72)
2017	44,944	▼304,376 (▼1.76)
2016	44,287	▼331,228 (▼1.89)
2015	39,255	▲344,601 (▲1.97)
2014	31,479	▲311,389 (▲1.88)
2013	23,708	▲273,847 (▲1.76)
2012	26,820	▲244,162 (▲1.68)
2011	27,442	▼198,552 (▼1.55)
2010	19,185	▲229,329 (▼1.98)
2009	20,629	▼215,975 (▲2.07)
2008	29,682	▼260,087 (▼1.96)
2007	40,496	▲329,177 (▲2.07)
2006	40,337	▲322,434 (▼1.95)
2005	23,340	▲302,895 (▲2.04)
2004	21,122	▲287,927 (▲1.70)
2003	18,318	▲259,755 (▲1.56)
2002	19,435	▲234,109 (▲1.40)
2001	21,357	▲223,983 (▲1.30)
2000	17,214	▲206,037 (▲1.20)
1999	15,800	▲185,890 (▲1.10)
1998	6,938	▲156,260 (▲1.00)
1997	3,408	▲97,563 (▲0.60)
1996		▼81,529 (0.50)
1995		▼83,616 (▼0.50)
1994		▼91,554 (▼0.58)
1993		▲99,280 (▼0.64)
1992		▲92,890 (▲0.69)
1991		▲71,206 (▲0.58)
1990		▲63,534 (▲0.46)
1989		▲16,302 (▲0.11)
1988		0 (0.00)

=== Financial performance ===
Financial data of Lexus operations are not disclosed publicly. However, automotive analysts estimate that the Lexus division contributes a disproportionate share of Toyota's profits, relative to its limited production and sales volume. Interviews with retired division officials indicate that depending on sales volume, vehicle product development cycles, and exchange rates, Lexus sales have accounted for as much as half of Toyota's annual U.S. profit in certain years. Division executives have employed pricing strategies aimed at sustaining profit margins rather than sales volume, with historically fewer price incentives than rival brands. In 2006, Lexus entered Interbrand's list of the Top 100 Global Brands for the first time, with an estimated brand value of approximately $3 billion annually. In 2009, Interbrand ranked Lexus as Japan's seventh largest brand, between Panasonic and Nissan, based on revenue, earnings, and market value.

=== Leadership ===
- Kiyotaka Ise (2012–2014)
- Tokuo Fukuichi (2014–2020)
- Koji Sato (2020–2023)
- Takashi Watanabe (2023–present)

== Automobiles ==
=== Vehicle lineup ===
The global Lexus lineup features sedans of different size classes, including the compact IS model, mid-size ES models, and the full-size LS. The 2-door coupe range consists of the RC and the LC. Former convertibles include the SC and IS C models. Sport-utility vehicles range in size from the subcompact UX, compact NX and mid-size RX crossovers, to the full-size GX and LX, the discontinued HS and GS, and variants of the IS, ES, LS, RC, LC, LBX, UX, NX, RX, TX and LM. The F marque line formerly produced a variant of the IS, GS and the LFA and currently produces a variant of the RC coupe.

=== F marque ===
Lexus F marque emblem

Lexus produces its highest-performance models under its F marque division. The name refers to Flagship and Fuji Speedway in Japan, whose first corner, 27R, inspired the shape of the "F" emblem. F marque models are developed by the Lexus Vehicle Performance Development Division. The first F marque model, the IS F, went on sale in 2007, followed by the LFA in 2009. A related F-Sport performance trim level and factory-sanctioned accessory line is available for standard Lexus models such as the IS 250 and IS 350. The F-Sport trim level commonly includes cosmetic upgrades to the exterior and interior, and in some vehicles, mechanical upgrades such as an adaptive variable suspension. F-Sport succeeded an earlier in-house tuning effort, the TRD-based L-Tuned, which had offered performance packages on the IS and GS sedans in the early 2000s (decade).

Additions to the performance F Sport marque include the Lexus RC F Sport and Lexus GS F Sport and Lexus LS F Sport.

=== Model nomenclature ===
Lexus production models are named alphanumerically using two-letter designations followed by three digits. The first letter indicates relative status in the Lexus model range (ranking), and the second letter refers to car body style or type (e.g. LS for 'luxury sedan'). The three digits commonly indicate engine displacement in liters multiplied by a factor of one hundred (e.g. 350 for a 3.5 L engine), except in the case of turbocharged and hybrid vehicles, for which the digits correspond to the displacement of a naturally aspirated engine with equivalent output (on hybrids, the three digits refer to the combined gasoline-electric output). A space is used between the letters and numbers. The same letter may be used differently depending on the model; 'S' can refer to 'sedan' or 'sport' (e.g. in LS and SC), while 'X' refers to 'luxury utility vehicle' or SUV. For certain models, a lower case letter placed after the alphanumeric designation indicates powerplant type ('h' for hybrid, 'd' for diesel, 't' for turbocharged), while capital letter(s) placed at the end indicates a class subtype (e.g. 'L' for long-wheelbase, 'C' for coupe, 'AWD' for all-wheel drive). On F marque models, the two-letter designation and the letter 'F' are used with no numbers or hyphens (e.g. IS F).

== Design and technology ==
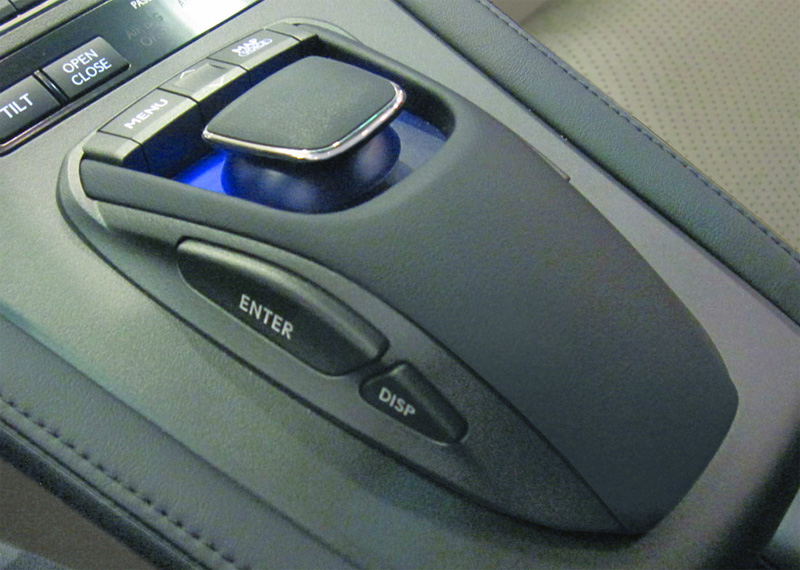
Lexus Remote Touch controller

Lexus design has traditionally placed an emphasis on targeting specific vehicle development standards. Since the marque's inception, design targets have ranged from aerodynamics and ride quality to interior ergonomics. The backronym "IDEAL" ("Impressive, Dynamic, Elegant, Advanced, and Lasting") is used in the development process. Each vehicle is designed according to approximately 500 specific product standards, known as "Lexus Musts", on criteria such as leather seat stitching. Design elements from the marque's concept vehicle line, the LF series (including the 2003 LF-S and 2004 LF-C), have been incorporated in production models.

Vehicle cabins have incorporated electroluminescent Optitron gauges, SmartAccess, a smart key entry and startup system, and multimedia features. Beginning with the 2010 RX and HS models, the Remote Touch system, featuring a computer mouse-like controller with haptic feedback, was introduced; other models have featured touchscreen controls (through the 2009 model year) as a navigation screen interface. 2014 saw the introduction of the next version of Lexus' remote-touch innovations—the Remote Touch Interface Touchpad in the new RC Coupe.

In 1989, Lexus became among the first premium car marques to equip models with premium audio systems, in partnership with stereo firm Nakamichi. Since 2001, optional surround sound systems are offered via high-end audio purveyor Mark Levinson. For reduced cabin noise, the first LS 400 introduced sandwich steel plating, and later models added acoustic glass. In 2006, the LS 460 debuted the first ceiling air diffusers and infrared body temperature sensors in a car. Telematics services include G-Book with G-Link in Asia and Lexus Enform in North America.

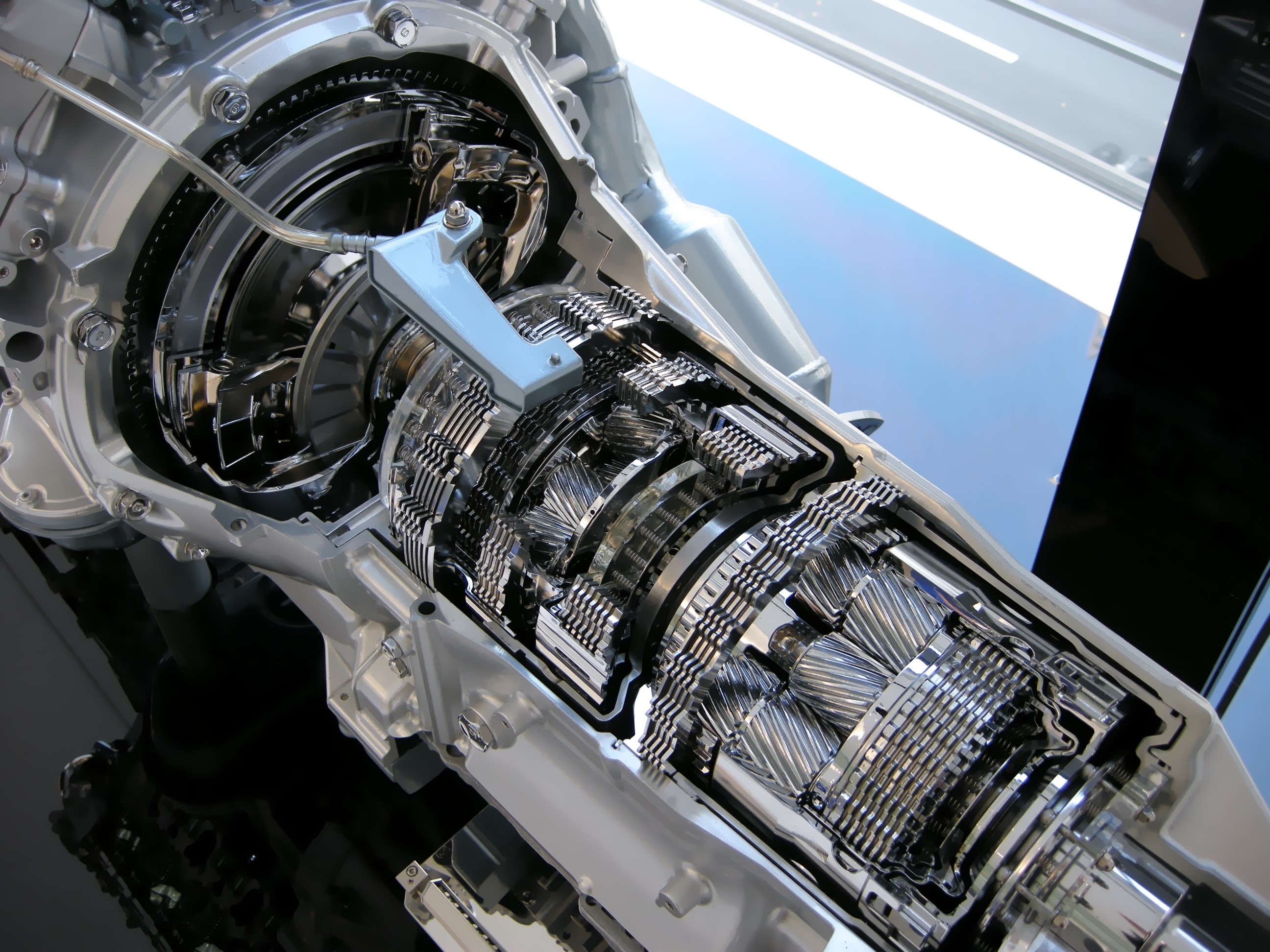
Eight-speed automatic transmission in the IS F and LS 460 Sport

In 2006, Lexus incorporated the first production eight-speed automatic transmission in an automobile with the LS 460, and the gearbox was later adapted for the GS 460 and IS F models. Continuously variable transmissions, regenerative brakes, and electric motors have been used on all Lexus hybrid models. In 2007, Lexus executives signaled intentions to equip further models with hybrid powertrains, catering to demands for a decrease in both carbon pollution and oil reliance. Hybrid models have been differentiated by separate badging and lighting technology; in 2008, the LS 600h L became the first production vehicle to use LED headlamps.

Safety features on Lexus models range from stability and handling programs (Vehicle Stability Control and Vehicle Dynamics Integrated Management) to backup cameras, swivel headlights, and sonar warning systems. The Lexus Pre-Collision System (PCS) integrates multiple safety systems. In 2007, Lexus introduced the first car safety systems with infrared and pedestrian detection capabilities, lane keep assist, a Driver Monitoring System with facial recognition monitoring of driver attentiveness, and rear pre-collision whiplash protection, as part of the LS 460 PCS. As a safety precaution, Lexus GPS navigation systems in many regions feature a motion lockout when the vehicle reaches a set speed; to prevent distraction, navigation inputs are limited, while voice input and certain buttons are still accessible. This safety feature has attracted criticism because passengers cannot use certain functions when the vehicle is in motion. Pre-2007 models came with a hidden manufacturer override option, and updated European models allow operation in motion.

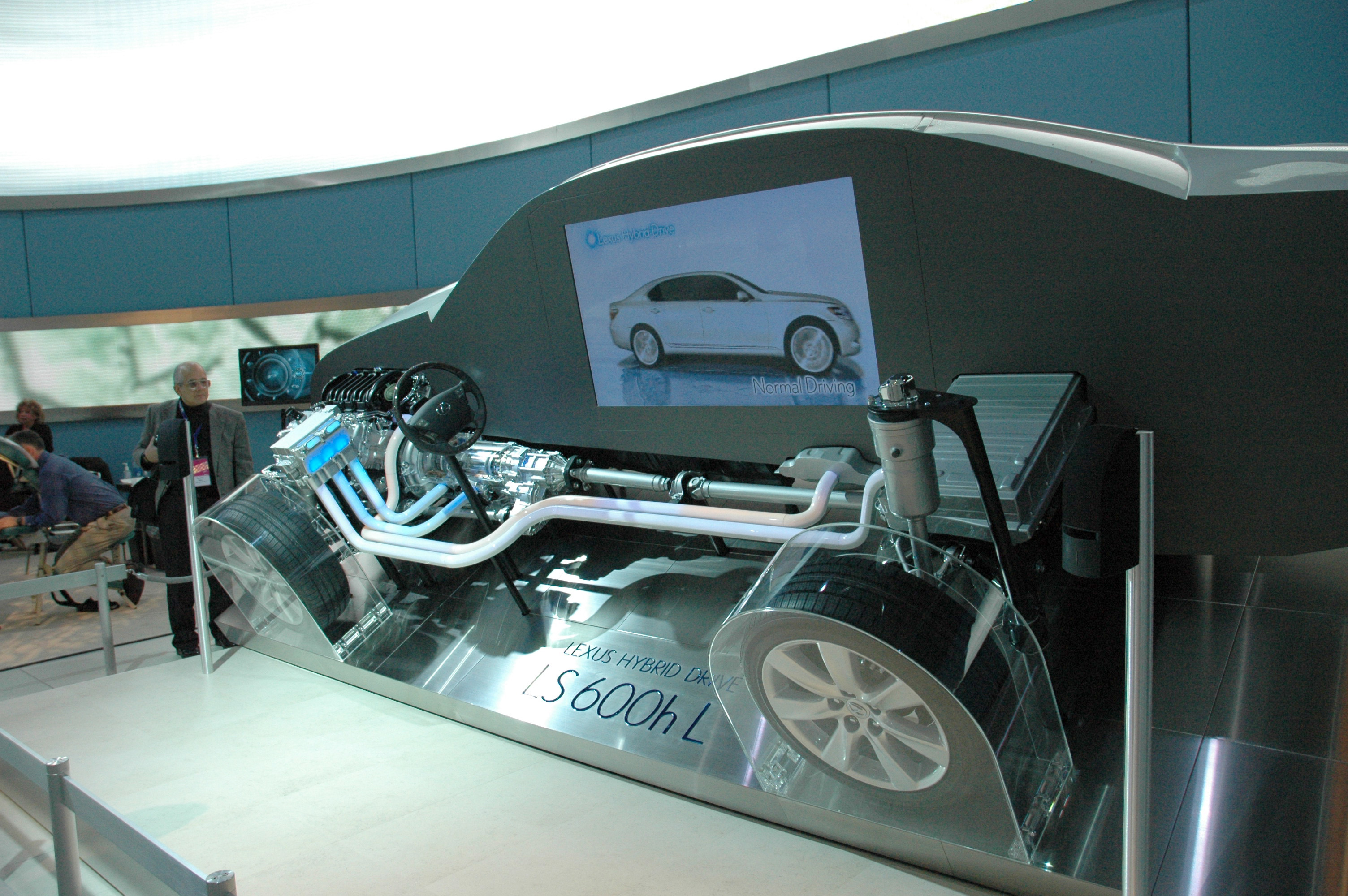
2006 LS 600h and LS 600h L in hybrid form

Production models in development have included convertibles, crossovers, and dedicated hybrids. Under the F marque, Lexus plans to produce high-performance vehicles with its first expressions being the IS F and the LFA. Lexus officials have also discussed standard production model usage of varying platforms. The LS uses a dedicated platform, while the entry-level Lexus ES had been criticized for being too similar to the Toyota Camry, with which it shared platforms until its sixth generation, in both styling and powertrain design. The Nürburgring test track in Germany has also seen Lexus prototype testing.

=== L-finesse ===
Lexus introduced a new design language known as "L-finesse" in the mid-2000s with its LF series concepts and the 2006 Lexus GS. L-finesse is represented by three Japanese kanji characters which translate as "Intriguing Elegance, Incisive Simplicity, and Seamless Anticipation". Design characteristics, including a fastback profile, lower-set grille, and the use of both convex and concave surfaces, are derived from Japanese cultural motifs (e.g. the phrase kirikaeshi in arrowhead shapes). While earlier Lexus models were criticized for reserved and derivative styling, and often mistaken for understated domestic market cars, automotive design analyses described L-finesse as adding a distinctive nature and embrace of Japanese design identity.

Opinions varied for L-finesse's debut on the GS; Sports Car International's analysis praised the vehicle's in-person appearance; Automobile Magazine criticized the daring of its forward styling, and compared subsequent rival models for design similarities. In 2012, the arrival of the redesigned fourth generation Lexus GS featured the introduction of a spindle-shaped grille design, intended to be used on all forthcoming Lexus models. L-finesse exhibitions were presented at Milan's Salone del Mobile from 2005 through 2009.

== Production ==
=== Assembly plants ===
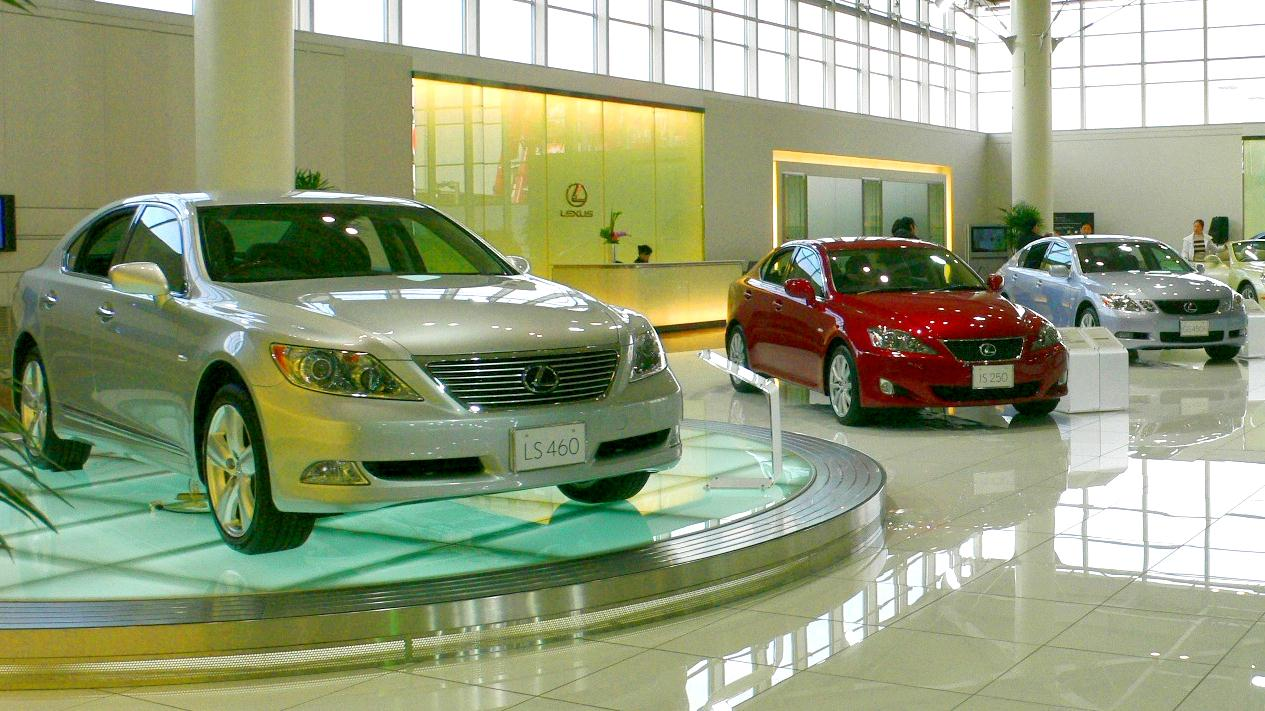
Lexus models produced by the Tahara plant in Aichi, Japan

The first Lexus vehicles were manufactured in Toyota's Tahara plant, a computerized manufacturing plant in Japan. Through the 2000s, most Lexus sedan and SUV production has occurred in Japan at the Tahara plant in Aichi and the Miyata plant in Fukuoka. In addition to the Tahara factory, over time Lexus vehicles have been produced at the Miyata plant (Toyota Motor Kyushu) in Miyawaka, Fukuoka; the Higashi-Fuji plant (Kanto Auto Works) in Susono, Shizuoka; and the Yoshiwara plant (Araco, later Toyota Auto Body) in Toyota City, Aichi. Front-wheel drive cars, such as the ES and HS, have been produced in the Fukuoka Prefecture.

Toyota Motor Kyushu's Kokura plant in Kitakyushu, Fukuoka, which opened in 2008, is a dedicated hybrid production site for hybrid systems used in Lexus models such as the gasoline-electric RX. The North American–market RX 350 (since the 2004 model year) is produced at the Cambridge plant (Toyota Canada, Inc.) in the city of Cambridge, in Ontario, Canada, which is the first Lexus production site located outside Japan. In late 2015, Lexus started to assemble North American-spec ES 350 sedans at the Georgetown plant (TMMK, Inc.). In January 2020, Toyota Kirloskar Motor of India started assembling the ES sedan in its Bidadi plant. Toyota planned to produce Lexus-branded EVs in its Shanghai factory beginning in 2027, which will be wholly owned (the second after Tesla's Gigafactory Shanghai and the first by a Japanese automaker).

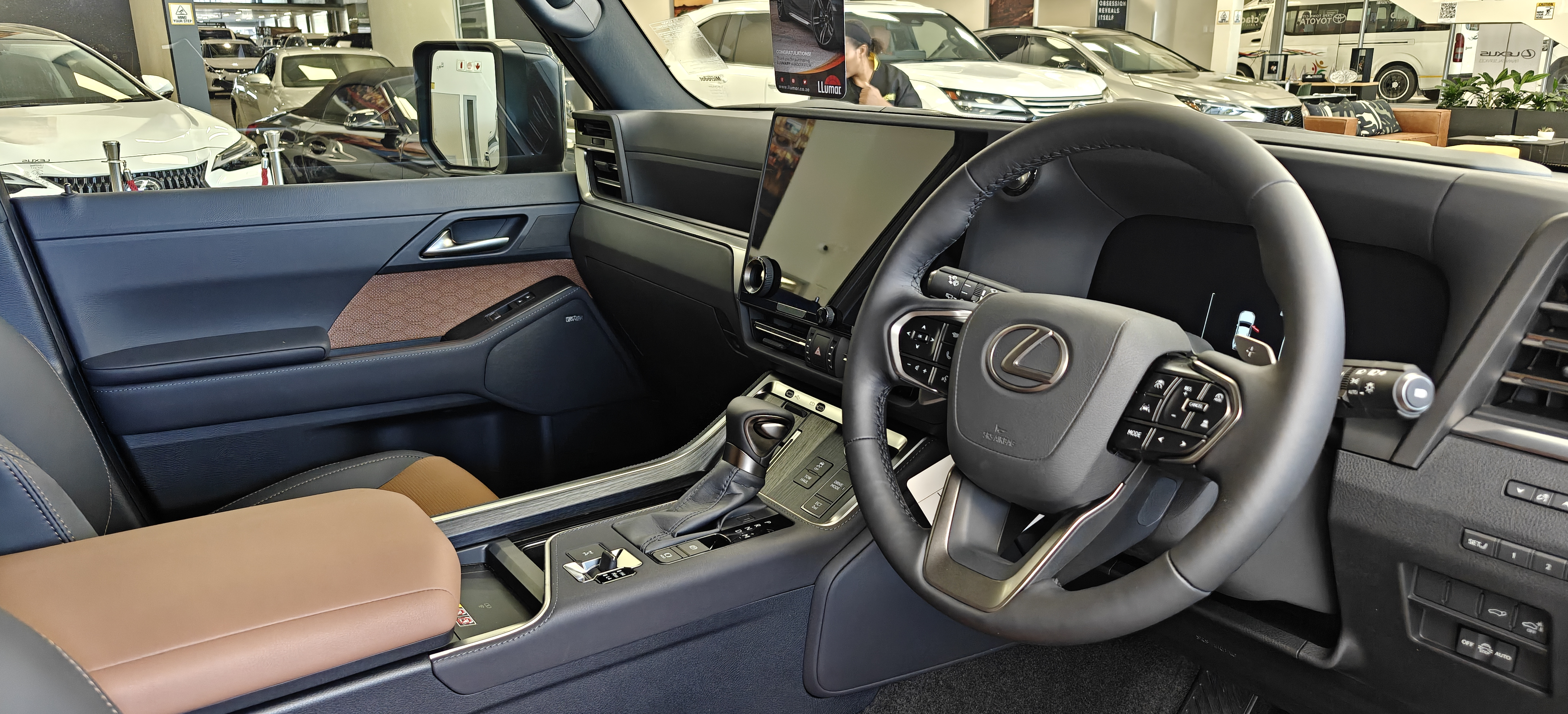
Interior fit and finish of a 2026 MY Lexus GX550 SE, in Cape Town

Relative to Toyota models, Lexus vehicles are built according to different quality control standards, including more stringent body panel fit tolerances and paint quality requirements. Their manufacture involves different assembly lines, molds, welding processes, and manufacturing equipment. Lexus plant workers also undergo a more selective screening process. Production vehicles are given visual inspections for flaws, individually test-driven at high speeds, and subjected to vibration tests.

Assembly sites by model
Plant	Owner	Location	Country	Model(s)
Tahara	Toyota Motor Corp.	Tahara, Aichi Prefecture	Japan	LS, GS, IS, GX, RC, NX, LM
Tsutsumi	Toyota Motor Corp.	Toyota City, Aichi Prefecture	Japan	ES
Kokura	Toyota Motor Kyushu, Inc.	Kitakyushu, Fukuoka Prefecture	Japan	CT, HS, RX
Miyata	Toyota Motor Kyushu, Inc.	Miyawaka, Fukuoka Prefecture	Japan	ES, IS, RX, NX, UX
Motomachi	Toyota Motor Corp.	Toyota City, Aichi Prefecture	Japan	LFA, LC, RZ
Higashi Fuji	Kanto Auto Works, Ltd.	Susono, Shizuoka Prefecture	Japan	SC
Yoshiwara	Toyota Auto Body Corp.	Toyota City, Aichi Prefecture	Japan	LX
Cambridge	Toyota Motor Manufacturing Canada	Cambridge, Ontario	Canada	RX, RXh, NX
Georgetown	Toyota Motor Manufacturing Kentucky	Georgetown, Kentucky	United States	ES
Princeton	Toyota Motor Manufacturing Indiana	Princeton, Indiana	United States	TX
Bidadi	Toyota Kirloskar Motor	Bidadi, Karnataka	India	ES
Shanghai	Toyota Motor China	Jinshan, Shanghai	China	Future EVs

=== Quality rankings ===
In the 2000s (decade), Consumer Reports named Lexus among the top five most reliable brands in its Annual Car Reliability Surveys of over one million vehicles across the U.S.

== Service ==
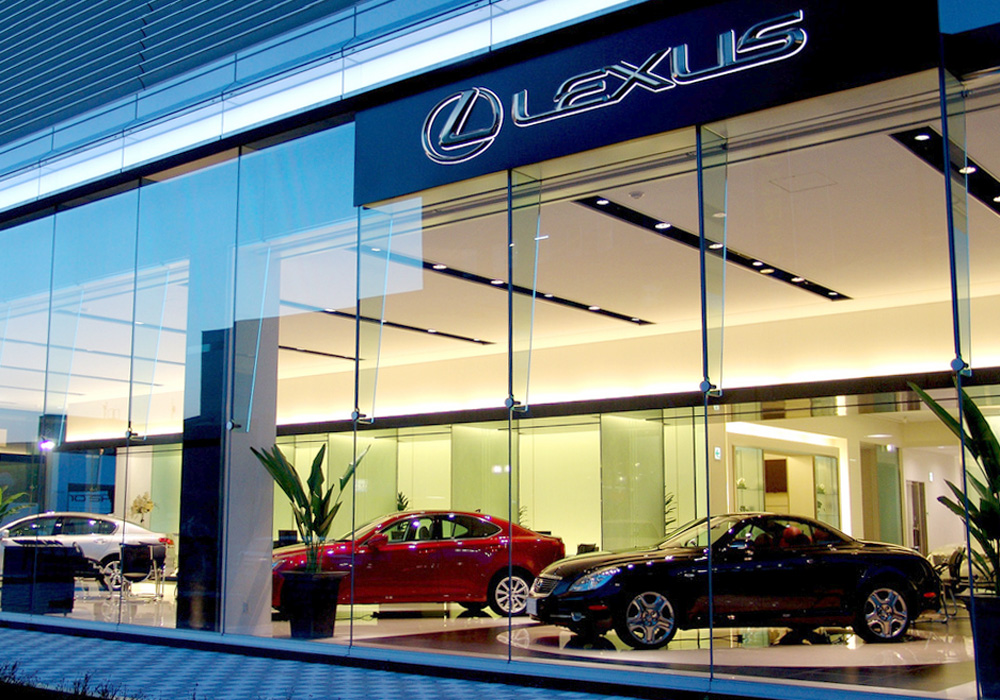
Lexus dealership showroom in Sapporo, Hokkaido, Japan

Lexus has become known for efforts to provide an upscale image, particularly with service provided after the sale. The waiting areas in service departments are replete with amenities, ranging from refreshment bars to indoor putting greens. Dealerships typically offer complimentary loaner cars or "courtesy cars" and free car washes, and some have added on-site cafes and designer boutiques. Service bays are lined with large picture windows for owners to watch the servicing of their vehicle. In 2005, Lexus also began reserving parking lots at major sporting arenas, entertainment events, and shopping malls, with the only requirement for free entry being the ownership of a Lexus vehicle. An online owner publication, Lexus Magazine, features automotive and lifestyle articles and is published online monthly and on a mobile site.

Since 2002, Lexus has scored consecutive top ratings in the Auto Express and 76,000-respondent Top Gear customer satisfaction surveys in the UK. Lexus has also repeatedly topped the Luxury Institute, New York surveys in the U.S. To improve customer service, employees are instructed to follow the "Lexus Covenant", the marque's founding promise (which states that "Lexus will treat each customer as we would a guest in our home"), and some dealerships have incorporated training at upscale establishments such as Nordstrom department stores and Ritz-Carlton hotels.

== Motorsport ==
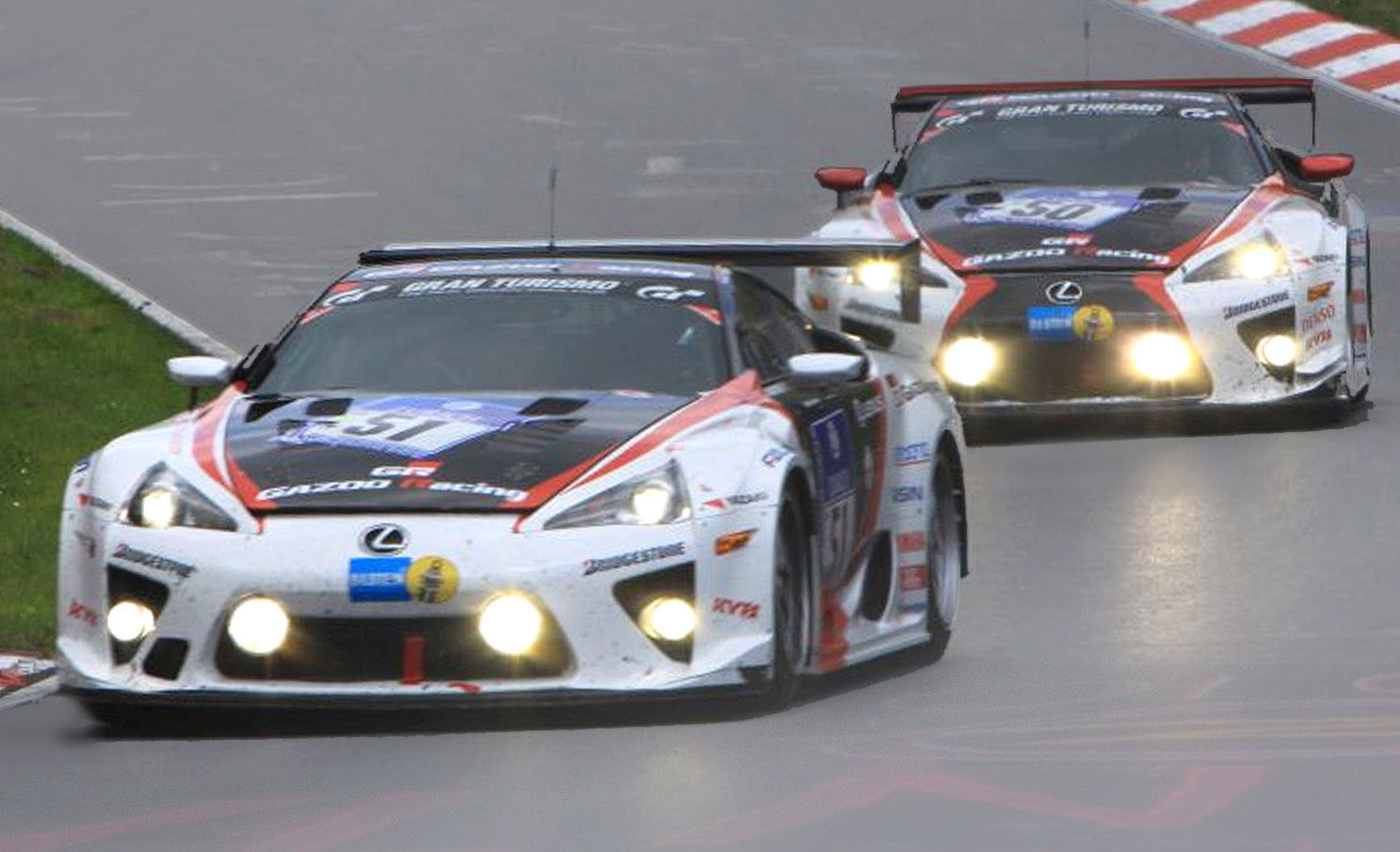
Lexus campaigned at the 24 Hours Nürburgring.

Lexus first entered the motorsport arena in 1999 when its racing unit, Team Lexus, fielded two GS 400 race vehicles in the Motorola Cup North American Street Stock Championship touring car series. In its 1999 inaugural season, Team Lexus achieved its first victory with its sixth race at Road Atlanta. Led by Sports Car Club of America and International Motor Sports Association driver Chuck Goldsborough, based in Baltimore, Maryland, Team Lexus capitalized on the debut of the first generation Lexus IS by entering three IS 300s in the third race of the 2001 Grand-Am Cup season at Phoenix, Arizona. Team Lexus won its first IS 300 victory that year at the Virginia International Raceway. In 2002, Team Lexus' competitive efforts in the Grand-Am Cup ST1 (Street Tuner) class achieved victories in the Drivers' and Team Championships, as well as a sweep of the top three finishes at Circuit Mont-Tremblant in Quebec, Canada.

After the release of the Lexus brand in the Japanese domestic market in 2005, Lexus sanctioned the entry of four SC 430 coupes in the Super GT series of the All Japan Grand Touring Car Championship in the GT500 class. In the first race of the 2006 series, an SC 430 took the chequered flag, and drivers André Lotterer and Juichi Wakisaka raced the SC 430 to capture the GT500 championship for that year. In 2007, another SC 430 won the GT500 opening round race. In 2006, Lexus raced a hybrid vehicle for the first time, entering a GS 450h performance hybrid sedan in partnership with Sigma Advanced Racing Development at the 24 Hours of Tokachi race in Hokkaido, Japan. Lexus Canada also entered the GS 450h in 2007's Targa Newfoundland event. In 2009, Lexus Super GT Team SC 430 and IS 350 racers won the GT500 and GT300 championships, respectively.

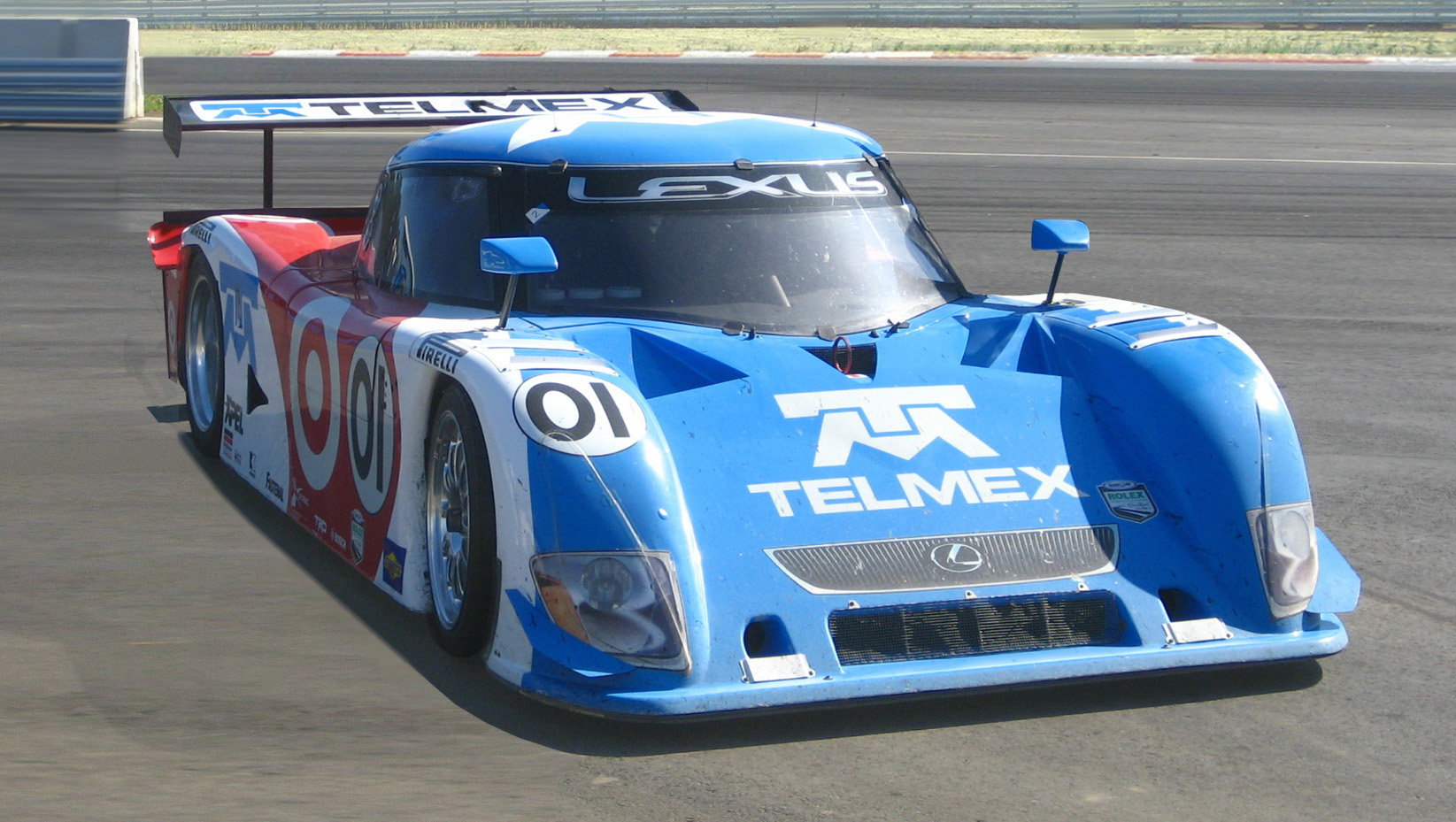
In 2006, 2007, and 2008, Lexus won the Rolex Sports Car Series Manufacturers' Championship.

Lexus' participation in endurance racing further includes the Rolex 24 Hours of Daytona, sanctioned by the Grand American Road Racing Association. After entering the Rolex Sports Car Series in 2004, Lexus has won over 15 Rolex Series event races. In 2005, Lexus was runner-up, and in 2006, it won the championship. Although Toyota has won this race in the past, it was the first time that its luxury arm emerged as the winner. In 2007, six Lexus-powered Daytona prototypes were entered in the Rolex 24 Hours of Daytona event at the Daytona International Speedway. Lexus was a repeat winner of the event, with a Lexus-Riley prototype driven by Scott Pruett, Juan Pablo Montoya, and Salvador Durán of Chip Ganassi Racing finishing first; Lexus-Riley prototypes also took three of the top ten spots. In 2008, Lexus won its third consecutive win at Daytona. For the 2010 season, Lexus departed from the Rolex Sports Car Series, and Ganassi Racing switched to BMW/Dinan engines.

The LF-A prototype also competed on the Nürburgring from 2008 to 2011 in VLN endurance races and in the 24 Hours Nürburgring, also with the IS F. On 14 May 2011, a CT 200h tuned up by Gazoo Racing competed in the Adenauer ADAC Rundstrecken-Trophy, a six-hour endurance race.

3GT Racing, a partnership of Lexus and Paul Gentilozzi, entered two Lexus RC F GT3 at the N.American 2017 WeatherTech SportsCar Championship in the GT Daytona class. Their first win came in the 2018 WeatherTech SportsCar Championship with Dominik Baumann and Kyle Marcelli at Mid-Ohio before winning again with the same pairing at Virginia International Raceway. Lexus finished in 8th in their first season in 2017 in the GT Daytona Manufacturer's Championship. They then improved to 5th in 2018 with the #14 achieving 5th and the #15 getting 10th in the Team's Championship.

For the 2019 WeatherTech SportsCar Championship, the running of the Lexus GT3 cars has been transferred to AIM Vasser Sullivan, which is a debuting partnership, where the driver pairing of Jack Hawksworth and Richard Heistand have currently achieved 2 wins at Mid-Ohio before winning the next race at Belle Isle. As of the result of Lime Rock Park, Lexus are second in the 2019 Manufacturer's Championship and the #12 is third with the #14 in 5th despite that being the winning car.

Lexus won the 2023 IMSA GTD Pro championship with Vasser Sullivan. The championship was won by the driver pairing of Ben Barnicoat and Jack Hawksworth, who had competed together as Lexus factory drivers since 2022, and finished off the podium only twice throughout the 2023 season.

== Marketing ==
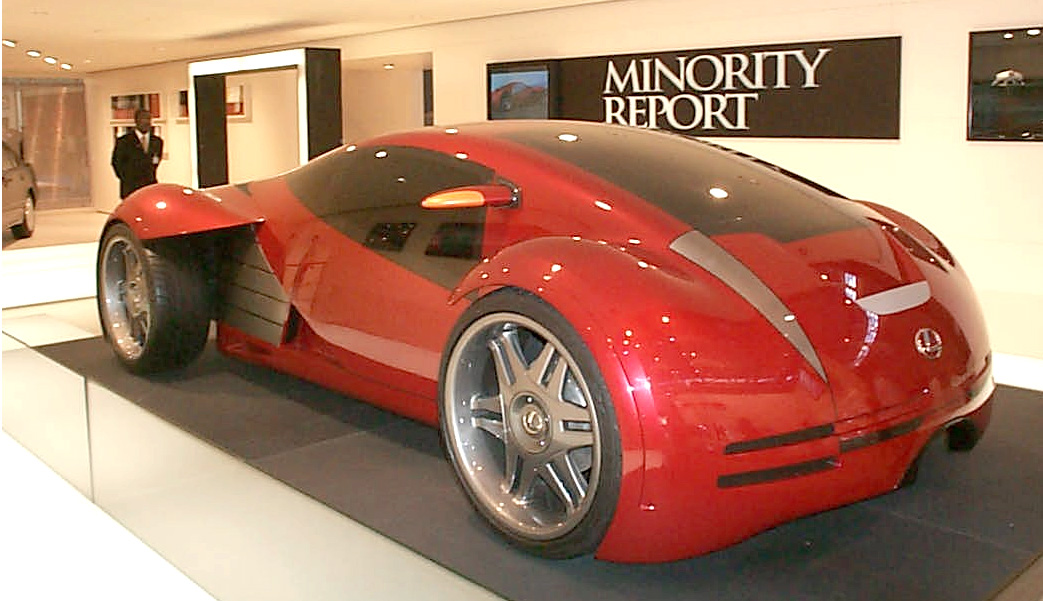
Lexus 2054, a concept model produced for the film Minority Report

From its inception, Lexus has been advertised to luxury consumers using specific marketing strategies, with a consistent motif used for the marque's advertisements. Beginning in 1989, television ads were narrated by actor James Sloyan (the voice of "Mr. Lexus" until 2009), and accompanied by vehicles that performed unusual stunts onscreen. The first decade of Lexus commercials (1989–99) consisted primarily of disjunctive verbal descriptions, such as "relentless", "pursuit", and "perfection", while vehicles were used to claim superiority in precision, idling, and interior quiet and comfort on camera. Examples included the champagne glass "Balance" (1989) and rolling "Ball Bearing" (1992).

In the 2000s (decade), commercials included descriptions of features, or a narration of the events onscreen, and were often targeted at the marque's German competitors. An annual "December to Remember" campaign featured scenes of family members surprising loved ones with the gift of a new Lexus. The marque returned to the champagne glass theme in a 2006 LS 460 spot showing the sedan maneuvering between two stacks of glasses using its self-parking system, and in a 2010 LFA spot showing its engine sound shattering a glass via resonance frequency.

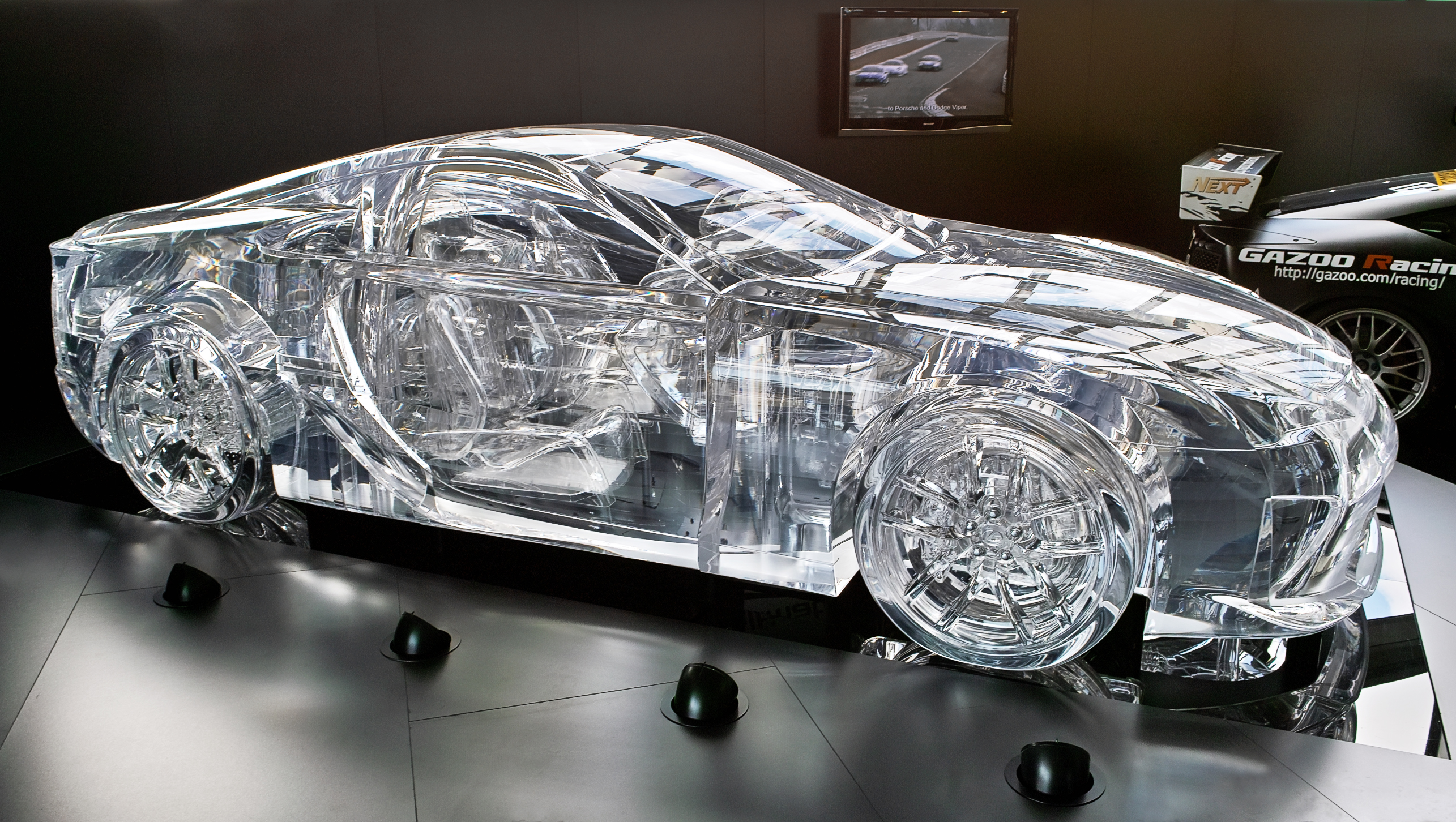
Lexus LFA Crystallised Wind, a full-size glass art model

Industry observers have attributed Lexus' early marketing successes to higher levels of perceived quality and lower prices than competitors, which have enabled the marque to attract customers upgrading from mass-market cars. A reputation for dependability, bolstered by reliability surveys, also became a primary factor in attracting new customers from rival premium makes. Lexus has since grown to command higher price premiums than rival Japanese makes, with new models further increasing in price and reaching the more than $100,000 ultra-luxury category long dominated by rival European marques.

Automotive analysts have also noted Lexus' relative newcomer status as a marketing challenge for the brand, although some have debated the requirement of a long history. European rivals have marketed their decades of heritage and pedigree, whereas Lexus' reputation rests primarily upon its perceived quality and shared history with parent company Toyota. Several analysts have stated that Lexus will have to develop its own heritage over time by highlighting technological innovations and producing substantial products.

Lexus' marketing efforts have extended to sporting and charity event sponsorships, including the U.S. Open tennis Grand Slam event from 2005 to 2009, and the United States Golf Association's U.S. Open, U.S. Women's Open, U.S. Senior Open, and U.S. Amateur tournaments since 2007. Lexus has organized an annual Champions for Charity golf series in the U.S. since 1989. Endorsement contracts have also been signed with professional athletes Hideki Matsuyama, Andy Roddick, Annika Sörenstam, and Peter Jacobsen.

Since 2008, Lexus has run the video website L Studio. Shows on L Studio include Web Therapy.

Lexus unveiled its new "Experience Amazing" tagline in the U.S. in a 60-second advertisement at the February 2017 Super Bowl LI. The new tagline replaced Lexus's previous slogans, "Amazing in Motion" and "The Pursuit of Perfection".

On 30 March 2018, Lexus premiered a fake partnership with 23 and Me during a spot on Saturday Night Live, for a pretend program that allows buyers to customize vehicles based on their DNA, as an April Fool's Day joke.

Lexus has renewed its sponsorship of the Esports Awards on 23 October 2024. As part of the partnership, Lexus will present awards for "Esports Content Creator of the Year" and "Esports Organization of Year" during the second half of the awards ceremony, which will take place in November 2024. The first half of the awards was presented in July 2024 during the Esports World Cup in Riyadh, Saudi Arabia. Financial terms of this continued partnership were not disclosed.

=== Lexus slogans ===
- The Relentless Pursuit of Perfection (1989–2011)
- The Pursuit of Perfection (2010–2016)
- Amazing in Motion (2013–2016)
- Experience Amazing (2017–present)

== See also ==
- The Championship by Lexus
- Slide (hoverboard)
