= Ball Bearing (advertisement) =

1992 television advertisement for Lexus ES 300

- ES 300 on articulating frame
- Agency: Team One
- Client: Lexus
- Language: English
- Running time: 30 seconds
- Product: Lexus ES 300
- Release date: 1992 (Television)
- Directed by: Henry Sandbank
- Music by: MachineHead
- Production company: Sandbank
- Produced by: Francesca Cohn

Ball Bearing was a 1992 television advertisement for the Lexus ES 300, which introduced the luxury sedan to American television audiences. It was created by Team One, a unit of Saatchi & Saatchi. The advertisement showed a ball bearing rolling smoothly down the panel seams of a Lexus sedan, thus demonstrating the precise quality of its exterior elements. The television spot won awards, was emulated by subsequent commercials, and was credited for focusing industry attention on body tolerances.

== Synopsis ==
The advertisement showed the Lexus ES 300 on an articulating stand. A lab-suited technician places a silver ball bearing on the hood seam, and lets go. The ball bearing rolls smoothly down the seam as if on a track. As the stand rotates, moving the ES 300 slowly around several axes, the ball bearing travels across the roof, grille, tail lamps, in a continuous uninterrupted motion, without falling. The narration reads, "Every sports sedan is supposed to do well in the fast lane. But what about these lanes...? At Lexus, we achieved extremely tight tolerances between all major body panels. So not only does the ES 300 look like it's put together well, it actually is put together well."

== Reception ==
The advertisement received a Clio Award for Best Special Effects in a Television Advertisement, awarded to Special Effects director John Frazier of Fxperts Inc. Ball Bearing was named one of its Best Spots of 1992 by industry publication Adweek. The National Institute of Standards and Technology in the United States, as part of its Advanced Technology Project (an awards program for the development of high-risk, early-stage technologies for the U.S. industry), worked with General Motors, Chrysler, two universities, and suppliers on the "2-millimeter project." The goal of this project was to develop a new standard for automotive body dimension control, with a goal being to be able to duplicate the Lexus ball bearing test on a U.S.-built car. The advertisement was credited with focusing attention on quality in the United States.

== Later versions ==
Other advertisers referenced Ball Bearing in subsequent commercials, including car manufacturer Nissan who duplicated the ball bearing test and other Lexus displays in subsequent ads. The Nissan ads, designed for the debut of the Nissan Altima in 1993, demonstrated a similar display of ball bearings on their less expensive vehicle, with a narrator saying, "When we at Nissan saw Lexus do a test like this to show how well their car was put together, we were impressed, so we decided to do the same test on the new $13,000 Nissan Altima."

In 1993, Saturday Night Live parodied the sequence in a mock commercial for the Chameleon XLE, a fictitious luxury car whose exterior looks deceptively like that of an abandoned vehicle in order to ward off potential thieves. In the ad, the ball is placed on the car's rusted, dented, and faded front left fender and falls through a rust hole in the hood. It then comes out the car's right front wheel well. The ad stars Phil Hartman.

A Roy Rogers ad also parodied the Ball Bearing spot by rolling a ball bearing around the edge of a roast beef sandwich. The Roy Rogers ad went on to win an Addy Award on behalf of the Smithsonian Center for Advertising History.

In 1995, Dirt Devil also parodied the Ball Bearing spot by rolling a ball bearing around the body of its MVP upright vacuum cleaner.

In 2008, Lexus again referenced Ball Bearing with a new version for the Lexus IS 250 AWD, which showed a ball bearing rolling on the seams of the vehicle before the car is driven across a sea of ball bearings.

== Credits ==
- Agency: Team One, El Segundo, California
- Creative Director: Tom Cordner
- Agency Director: Mike Mazza
- Copy Writer: Steve Silver
- Agency Producer: Francesca Cohn
- Production Company: Sandbank Films
- Director: Henry Sandbank
- Editor: Stuart Waks, Stuart Waks & Co.
- SFX Producer: John Frazier
- Music: MachineHead:
- Narrator: James Sloyan
- Production Design: Michael Gaw
