= James Sloyan =

American actor (1941-2026)

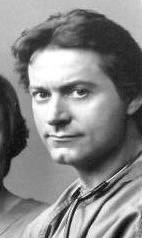
- Sloyan in Westside Medical (1977)
- Born: James J. Sloyan; February 24, 1941; Indianapolis, Indiana, U.S.
- Died: July 22, 2026 (aged 85); Sherman Oaks, California, U.S.
- Other name: Jim Sloyan
- Education: American Academy of Dramatic Arts
- Occupation: Actor
- Years active: 1957–2008
- Spouse: Deirdre Lenihan (m. 1973)
- Children: 2, including Samantha Sloyan
- Relatives: Patrick J. Sloyan (brother)

James Joseph Sloyan Jr. (February 24, 1941 – July 22, 2026) was an American character actor of stage and screen, as well as a much-employed voice actor, most notably via his two-decade tenure as the voice of Lexus. He is the father of Samantha Sloyan.

== Early life and career ==
Sloyan was born in Indianapolis, Indiana, on February 24, 1941. One of four children, two girls and two boys, born to James J. Sloyan and Annamae O'Brien (another being Pulitzer Prize-winning journalist Patrick J. Sloyan), Sloyan Jr. spent most of the next nine and a half years in Europe, namely Italy, Switzerland, Ireland, and—if only long enough to board the next ship bound for home—Paris, France, before dividing the remainder of his preteens/adolescence between three decidedly disparate New York State municipalities. 1) Mechanicville, the birthplace of Sloyan's mother; 2) Albany, the state capitol, where, by his own count, Sloyan was "actually thrown out of five [or] six high schools", and 3) New York City, where in 1957, Sloyan embarked on his scholarship-subsidized two years of study at the American Academy of Dramatic Arts.

Sloyan's acting career was interrupted in 1962, when he was drafted into the United States Army during the Vietnam War.

== Television ==
Sloyan's television career includes numerous brief performances on daytime dramas The Young and the Restless, General Hospital, and Ryan's Hope, and guest appearances on prime-time series Hawaii Five-O; The Streets of San Francisco; Wonder Woman; Baywatch; Moonlighting; Quantum Leap; The X-Files; MacGyver; Party of Five; Matlock; Murder, She Wrote; and Dr. Quinn, Medicine Woman. He appeared in the television movies Blind Ambition, Billionaire Boys Club, and My Son Is Innocent.

In the fall of 1970, Sloyan, James Broderick, and Reni Santoni were cast in the ABC Movie of the Week episode, "Panic on the 5:22", as a trio of underprivileged, disaffected, and somewhat desperate Bronx residents who board a suburbs-bound commuter train in Manhattan and, after donning ski masks and drawing guns, commandeer its club car in hopes of making a quick killing. Much to their dismay, these hopes are promptly dashed, and their desperation dramatically escalated, by the discovery that these affluent suburbanites carry nothing but credit cards. In 1972, Sloyan co-starred with James Coco in Neil Simon's "The Greasy Spoon", one of five sketches that comprise his dark comedy, The Trouble With People, presented by Bell System Television Theatre on NBC-TV.

He appeared in a number of science fiction television series, including Buck Rogers in the 25th Century, in which he portrayed Barnard "Barney" Smith in the episode "The Plot to Kill a City", and several roles in the Star Trek franchise. In Star Trek: The Next Generation, he portrayed Alidar Jarok (a defecting Romulan admiral) in "The Defector", and Alexander Rozhenko (Worf's son) as an adult in the future, in "Firstborn" using the alias "K'mtar". In Star Trek: Deep Space Nine, he portrayed the Bajoran scientist Doctor Mora Pol, Odo's guardian scientist in the episodes "The Begotten" and "The Alternate". The Star Trek: Voyager episode "Jetrel" features Sloyan as the title character.

== Film ==
Sloyan is featured in The Sting as Mottola, who is used to illustrate the concept of a griftee, in a variation on the pigeon drop scam.

He played roles in The Traveling Executioner (1970), The Gang That Couldn't Shoot Straight (1971), and Xanadu (1980).

== Advertisements ==
For 20 years, Sloyan was the voice of Lexus. The company's first commercial, "Balance," aired in 1989 and went on to win several awards as well as homages in pop culture and media. Sloyan served as Lexus' sole voice actor until 2009. He later narrated ads for Mitsubishi. Sloyan was also a voice actor for Sprint Nextel long-distance services, and in film trailers for movies such as Jumper, The Shadow, and How to Make an American Quilt.

== Personal life and death ==
Sloyan and actress Deirdre Lenihan began dating in 1963 and became engaged five years later. By 1973, they were openly living together, and seemed poised to take the plunge. They had two children, Daniel Sloyan and actress Samantha Sloyan.

Sloyan died at his home in Sherman Oaks, California, on July 22, 2026, at the age of 85.

== Partial filmography ==
Year	Title	Role	Notes
1970	The Traveling Executioner	Piquant	As James J. Sloyan
1970	ABC Movie of the Week	Frankie Scamantino	Episode: "Panic on the 5:22"
1970	Great Performances	Actor	Episode: "Paradise Lost"
1971	NET Playhouse	Williams	2 episodes
1971	The Gang That Couldn't Shoot Straight	Joey	As James J. Sloyan
1972	Madigan	Tommy Lakka	Episode: "The Manhattan Beat"; as James J. Sloyan
1972	The Doctors	Al Jarrett	10 episodes
1972	Between Time and Timbuktu	Dr. Paul Proteus	TV movie
1973	Honor Thy Father	Pete Notario	TV movie; as James J. Sloyan
1973	The Sting	Mottola	As James J. Sloyan
1973	Chase	Riley	Episode: "Six for Five"
1973	Kojak	Jack Murzie	Episode: "Siege of Terror"; as James J. Sloyan
1974	Hawaii Five-O	Charles Fleming	Episode: "Murder with a Golden Touch"
1974	The Streets of San Francisco	Wilson Tubbs	Episode: "A String of Puppets"
1974	The Family Kovack	Vinnie Kovack	TV movie
1974	Cannon	Fred Ellis	Episode: "Kelly's Song"
1974	Panic on the 5:22	Frankie Scamantino	TV movie
1975	The Manhunter	Damon	Episode: "The Wrong Man"
1976	The Million Dollar Rip-Off	Lubeck	TV movie
1976	Delvecchio	Hank Foster	3 episodes
1976	The Disappearance of Aimee	Dist. Atty. Asa Keyes	TV movie
1977	Westside Medical	Dr. Sam Lanagan	13 episodes
1978	Centennial	Spade Larkin	2 episodes; miniseries
1979	The New Adventures of Wonder Woman	Mark Reuben	Episode: "The Girl with a Gift for Disaster"
1979	Buck Rogers in the 25th Century	Barney	Episode: The Plot to Kill a City, Parts 1 & 2
1979	Blind Ambition	Ronald Ziegler	TV Mini-Series, 4 episodes
1979	Kaz	Father O'Brian	Episode: "Trouble on the South Side"
1979	Act of Violence	Tony Bonelli	TV movie
1980	Xanadu	Simpson	
1980	Tenspeed and Brown Shoe	Mike 'Scoop' McGill	Episode: "The Millionaire's Life"
1980	Trouble in High Timber Country	John David Yaeger	TV movie
1982	Prime Suspect	John Malloy	TV movie
1985	Amos	Sheriff John Thomas	TV movie
1987	Billionaire Boys Club	District Attorney	TV movie
1987	Growing Pains	Max Drummond	Episode: "Confidentially Yours"
1990	Star Trek: The Next Generation	Alidar Jarok	Episode: "The Defector"
1991	Changes	Paul Stevenson	TV movie
1991	Quantum Leap	Theodore Moody	Episode: "Last Dance Before an Execution - S03E19"
1993	Crime & Punishment	The Interrogator	6 episodes (voice)
1994, 1997	Star Trek: Deep Space Nine	Dr. Mora Pol	Episodes: "The Alternate", "The Begotten"
1994	Star Trek: The Next Generation	K'mtar/Future Alexander	Episode: "Firstborn"
1994	X Files	Dr. Frank Nollette	Episode: "Roland"
1995	Star Trek: Voyager	Ma'bor Jetrel	Episode: "Jetrel"
2008	The Car and the Road		Short film (voice)
