= Panic on the 5:22 =

- Genre: Crime
- Written by: Eugene Price
- Directed by: Harvey Hart
- Starring: Ina Balin; Bernie Casey; Linden Chiles; Andrew Duggan
- Music by: Richard Markowitz
- Country of origin: United States
- Original language: English

Production
- Executive producer: Quinn Martin
- Producer: Anthony Spinner
- Cinematography: William W. Spencer
- Editor: Pembroke Herring
- Running time: 74 minutes
- Production company: Quinn Martin Productions

Original release
- Network: ABC
- Release: November 20, 1974

Panic on the 5:22 is a 1974 American made-for-television crime film starring Ina Balin and Bernie Casey. The film was written by Eugene Price and directed by Harvey Hart as an ABC Movie of the Week installment.

== Synopsis ==
Wealthy commuter train passengers are beset by three desperate characters, who become all the more desperate upon discovering their victims carry nothing but credit cards.

== Primary cast ==
- Ina Balin as Countess Hedy Maria Tovarese
- Bernie Casey as Wendell Weaver
- Linden Chiles as Tony Ebsen
- Andrew Duggan as Harlan Jack Garner
- Dana Elcar as Hal Rodgers
- Eduard Franz as Jerome Hartford
- Lynda Day George as Mary Ellen Lewis
- Laurence Luckinbill as Lawrence Lewis
- Dennis Patrick as Dudley Stevenson
- Robert Mandan as Dr. Cruikshank
- Reni Santoni as Emil Linz
- James Sloyan as Frankie Scamantino
- Robert Walden as Eddie Chiario

== Production ==
Panic was filmed in October 1964, primarily in Los Angeles, and on location in New York City,

Prior to filming, Robert Walden, who plays one of the would-be robbers, devoted two weeks to preparing for this role by living with a street gang in New York.

I got in through friends of mine who knew some of the boys. I thought they might resent me and tell me to drop dead when they learned my purpose. But it was just the opposite. They were intrigued by my being an actor and they wanted to be sure they were shown in their best light.

Once assembled on set, such was the level of enthusiasm for this project that the actors reportedly waived their fees for a full week of rehearsal. (Note: Enthusiasm notwithstanding, the actors ultimately were paid for that week, following a complaint lodged with SAG by one disgruntled cast member.) One genuinely scary real-life altercation occurred during that period, involving three cast members, Dana Elcar (who plays passenger Hal Rodgers), and two of the would-be killers, Walden and James Sloyan. Director Harvey Hart recalled the incident many years later.

My mouth must have been wide open. Here were three of my stars yelling curses at each other, shoving each other and threatening bodily harm. I started to jump up on the platform where our set was, when Sloyan turned on me and shouted: 'Turn the cameras over, for blankety-blank's sake.

Scary moment notwithstanding, when recalling the experience almost three decades later, star Linda Day George, cinematographer William W. Spencer, and producer Anthony Spinner were unanimous in singing the praises of director Hart. "That was one of the toughest shows we ever did," Spencer told author Jonathan Etter.

I think we had more than two weeks shooting time on that show. It was so confined. We had this mock-up train car, lots of rear prjection. The minute you changed angles, it affected everything else. Our lamps were so close to the people that if they walked near the hot lights, they could have burned up. You had to have a lot of control. You had to shoot out of continuity. That was very difficult for the director, Harvey Hart. Harvey kept a good mood on the set. That's why I enjoyed doing that movie. Harvey's attitude had a lot to do with why that movie worked.

== Critical reaction ==
The Hollywood Reporter's Sue Cameron rated the film a "better than average" movie-of-the-week and called it a "disaster film with a message".

Similarly, L.A. Times critic Kevin Thomas credits the director and writer with "hav[ing] struck a precise balance between suspense and social consciousness."

In the 35 minutes–minus commercials–before Walden and company don ski masks and draw their guns, Hart and Price show their wealthy would-be victims as largely unsympathetic types, for the most part arrogant, self-centered and, in a few instances, downright crooked. Thus, the difference between these rich passengers and the intruders is one of socio-economics rather than morals. Instead of presenting an old-fashioned, clear-cut confrontation between good and evil, Hart and Price make the discomfiting point that morality is relative -that evil resides in the dire circumstances of life that drove these three uneducated losers to commit such an ill-planned, desperate act, and in the indifference of a rich privileged few who so casually exploit and oppress society's less fortunate.

This point was reiterated many years later by Quinn Martin biographer Jonathan Etter.

Because this plot-line was so similar to the 1967 motion picture, 'The Incident', many critics saw 'Panic on the 5:22' as an inferior rip-off [...] As usual, the critics got it wrong. Unlike 'The Incident', which was simply about two thugs terrorizing people, 'Panic on the 5:22' was a study of the rich and the poor.
