= Patrick J. Sloyan =

American journalist (1937–2019)

Patrick Joseph Sloyan
- Born: January 11, 1937; Stamford, Connecticut, U.S.
- Died: February 4, 2019 (aged 82); Virginia, U.S.
- Occupation: Journalist
- Relatives: James Sloyan (brother)

Patrick Joseph Sloyan (January 11, 1937 – February 4, 2019) was a Pulitzer Prize-winning journalist, known for reporting on the Gulf War during the 1990s and revealing deaths of American troops caused by friendly fire.

== Early life and education ==
A native of Stamford, Connecticut, one of Patrick Sloyan's siblings was actor James Sloyan. Patrick joined the US Army in 1955. While serving in Germany, he became interested in journalism and began working for military publications. He got fired from one of them after reporting on a cook who was court-martialed for using too many potatoes.

While working as a reporter throughout the following years, Sloyan graduated from the University of Maryland in 1963 with a degree in economics.

== Career ==
Sloyan started his journalistic career at the age of twenty for the Times-Union in Albany. In 1958, he switched to the Baltimore News-Post, and afterward, he joined United Press International in Washington, where he was one of the first reporters to highlight automobile safety matters raised by consumer advocate Ralph Nader. Sloyan also covered the Civil rights movement, the Cuban missile crisis, the 1963 assassination of John F. Kennedy, and the Vietnam War.

After leaving United Press International in 1969, the journalist joined the Hearst News Service. In 1974, he began reporting for the Newsday. First, he covered stories from the nation's capital but later on, he moved to London to cover international reporting. In 1986, he got a position of Newsday bureau chief in Washington. In this capacity, he reported about the Watergate and the Iran–Contra affair.

In 1988, Sloyan was named Newsday senior correspondent and left the top executive position. Among his main works are investigations into the Gulf War. The materials included reporting on battlefield tactics of the war, the deaths of American troops caused by friendly fire, the burying of Iraqi troops alive, and the fact that new battles took place two days after the official ceasefire. His articles were awarded the Pulitzer Prize for International Reporting in 1992. Four years later Sloyan was part of a Newsday team that won a Pulitzer Prize for coverage of the crash of TWA Flight 800 near East Moriches, New York.

In the course of his career, the reporter was awarded the Deadline Writing Award by the American Society of News Editors (1981); the Best Newspaper Writing Award by Modern Media Institute (1982); the George Polk Award (1992). He also published two books: The Politics of Deception: JFK's Secret Decisions on Vietnam, Civil Rights, and Cuba (2015) and When Reagan Sent In the Marines (2019).

From 2002, Sloyan served as chairman of the Investigative Journalism Foundation. He also wrote for Rolling Stone, The New Republic, The Nation, and the The Guardian over the years. Sloyan died at the age of 82 in 2019 from colon cancer in his own home in Virginia.

== Books ==
- Brennan (1999). Who's who of Pulitzer Prize Winners. Westport: Greenwood Publishing Group. p. 666. ISBN 9781573561112.
- Fischer H. (2002). Complete Biographical Encyclopedia of Pulitzer Prize Winners, 1917-2000: Journalists, Writers and Composers on Their Ways to the Coveted Awards. Vienna: Walter de Gruyter. p. 290. ISBN 9783598301865.
