= Jetrel =

- Star Trek: Voyager episode
- Episode no.: Season 1 Episode 15
- Directed by: Kim Friedman
- Story by: James Thornton; Scott Nimerfro
- Teleplay by: Jack Klein; Karen Klein; Kenneth Biller
- Production code: 115
- Original air date: May 15, 1995

Guest appearances
- James Sloyan - Dr. Ma'bor Jetrel; Larry Hankin - Gaunt Gary

Episode chronology
← Previous "Faces"	Next → "Learning Curve"
- Star Trek: Voyager season 1

"Jetrel" is the fifteenth episode of the first season of Star Trek: Voyager. In this episode, Neelix struggles with conflicting emotions when he encounters a former enemy of his alien race.

The story was written by James Thomton and Scott Nimerfro, while the teleplay (aka script) by Jack Klein, Karen Klein, and Kenneth Biller. The episode was directed by Kim Friedman. It made its debut on television on May 15, 1995, on UPN.

== Plot ==
Neelix is aghast when a Haakonian named Dr. Ma'Bor Jetrel contacts Voyager and asks to meet him. The Haakonians fought a long, destructive war against his people, the Talaxians, fifteen years ago. Jetrel was responsible for developing the Metreon Cascade, a superweapon that killed over 300,000 people on Talax's moon Rinax, including Neelix's family. Jetrel says he has come forward to examine Talaxians like Neelix who helped evacuate survivors from Rinax, in the process exposing themselves to high concentrations of metreon isotopes that can cause a fatal blood disease, metremia. Although he considers Jetrel a monster, Neelix agrees to be examined and Jetrel informs him that he has incipient metremia. Jetrel convinces Captain Janeway to make a detour to the Talaxian system. Using the ship's transporter systems, Jetrel feels he will be able to develop a cure by retrieving samples of the Metreon cloud still surrounding Rinax.

Janeway agrees but Neelix is still bitter. He angrily condemns Jetrel for the devastation he caused, only to learn that the scientist is also paying the price—his wife left him in the wake of the attack on Rinax, his children refuse to acknowledge him, and he is in the final stages of metremia with only a few days to live. The ship's arrival at Rinax opens old wounds for Neelix. He confesses to Kes that he lied for years about being part of the Talaxian defense forces. He never reported for duty; instead, he spent the war hiding on Talax. Later, Neelix seeks out Jetrel in sickbay, only to find the Doctor deactivated and Jetrel covertly conducting experiments. Suspecting the worst of Jetrel, Neelix tries to notify Janeway but the scientist renders him unconscious.

Jetrel heads for the transporter room, where he is confronted by the Captain. Jetrel pleads with Janeway to let him conclude his work and bring back the deceased Talaxian victims of Rinax. He believes that he can use the transporter to regenerate their dissociated remains and confesses he came to Voyager as a pretext to use the ship's transporter; Neelix does not have metremia. Janeway allows Jetrel to proceed but the improbable experiment fails. The scientist collapses, knowing that he will never be able to redeem himself. Neelix pays a last visit to Jetrel and tells him that he is forgiven, allowing the Haakonian to die with some semblance of peace.

== Reception ==
Reviewers Lance Parkin and Mark Jones complained that Neelix's forgiveness was too hasty but accepted that it was inevitable in the scope of one episode.

The episode had a Nielsen rating of 5.8 when it aired in 1995.

In 2022, a reviewer on the website Collider listed the episode in their top 25 episodes of Star Trek: Voyager and wrote: "The beauty of science-fiction is its ability to reflect real-world incidents through a genre-specific lens".

== See also ==
- Actor James Sloyan castings in Star Trek
  - "The Alternate" (DS9 S2E12)
  - "Firstborn" (TNG S7E21)
  - "The Defector" (TNG S3E10)
  - "The Begotten" (DS9 S5E12)
- Technology in Star Trek
