= Westside Medical =

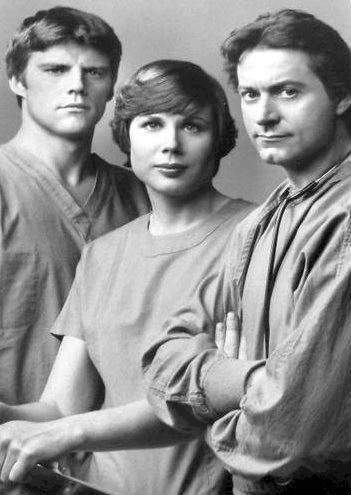
- Publicity photo. Ernest Thompson as Phil Barker (left), Linda Carlson as Janet Cottrell (center) and James Sloyan as Sam Lanagan (right)
- Created by: Barry Oringer
- Starring: James Sloyan
- Composer: Billy Goldenberg
- Country of origin: United States
- Original language: English
- No. of seasons: 1
- No. of episodes: 13 (2 unaired) (list of episodes)

Production
- Running time: 60 minutes
- Production company: Marstar Productions

Original release
- Network: ABC
- Release: March 17 – August 25, 1977

Westside Medical is an American medical drama that aired from March 17 until August 25, 1977.

== Premise ==
The series is about three young doctors working at a clinic in Southern California.

== Cast ==
- James Sloyan as Dr. Sam Lanagan
- Linda Carlson as Dr. Janet Cottrell
- Ernest Thompson as Dr. Phil Parker
- Alice Nunn as Carrie

== Episodes ==
No.	Title	Directed by	Written by	Original release date
1	"The Sound of Sunlight"	Ralph Senensky	Worley Thorne	March 17, 1977
A deaf woman gets new problems when her hearing is restored.
2	"The Witch of Four West"	Unknown	Unknown	March 24, 1977
Janet gets a patient who is devoted to faith healing. A tennis pro could lose a leg because of cancer.
3	"A Red Blanket for the City"	Unknown	James Menzies	March 31, 1977
A wealthy patron blames Sam for his daughter's paralysis.
4	"King Solomon's Kid (a.k.a. Turnabout)"	Unknown	Robert Lewin	April 7, 1977
A woman could lose custody of her adopted child because of an incurable illness.
5	"Intensive Caring"	Unknown	William Froug	April 14, 1977
Janet's boyfriend turns to alcohol after failing as a doctor.
6	"Risks"	Unknown	Robert Lewin and John Bloch	June 30, 1977
Janet, Sam and Phil risks their careers to help three patients.
7	"The Mermaid"	Unknown	Unknown	July 7, 1977
An East German swimmer is discovered to be transsexual after he is hospitalized because of a pool accident.
8	"The Devil & The Deep Blue Sea"	Unknown	Richard Fielder	July 14, 1977
Sam's new patient is the husband of the woman he has been seeing.
9	"My Physician, My Friend (1)"	Unknown	Unknown	August 11, 1977
Janet thinks she might have breast cancer. Phil's patient is a former girlfriend who is now a nun.
10	"My Physician, My Friend (2)"	Unknown	Unknown	August 18, 1977
Janet keeps busy with work while preparing for her own biopsy. Phil wants to find out why his former girlfriend has lost the will to live.
11	"Pressure Cooker"	Unknown	Larry Alexander	August 25, 1977
A veteran police officer tries to hide a bleeding ulcer because he fears premature retirement.
12	"Tears for a Two Dollar Wine"	TBD	TBD	UNAIRED
Sam's foster mother fights for control of the family winery.
13	"Sticks and Stones"	TBD	Tim Maschler	UNAIRED
