= Team One (advertising agency) =

American advertising agency

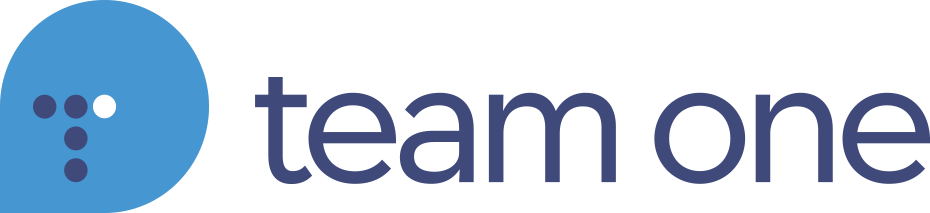
- Type: Private
- Industry: Advertising
- Founded: 1987
- Headquarters: Silicon Beach, Los Angeles, California
- Key people: Julie Michael, president
- Parent: Saatchi & Saatchi
- Website: www.teamone-usa.com

Team One, an advertising agency based in Los Angeles, California, is a division of Saatchi & Saatchi. It was founded in 1987 and focuses on luxury products and services.

== History ==
Team One has a staff of more than 400, including offices in Chicago, New York, Atlanta, and Washington, D.C. Originally based in El Segundo, it moved to Los Angeles, in 2014. The relocation of its main offices was described in a Los Angeles Business Journal article as part of the establishment of that street as a west coast analogue of Madison Avenue—home to many of the region's advertising agencies.

As of June 2015, Julie Michael is president of Team One; she has been with the company since 1998.

Team One has been names an AdAge Best Places To Work in 2024 and 2026.

== Notable campaigns ==
Noteworthy Team One advertising campaigns include:

- "December to Remember" ads for Lexus, 2014
- ”Six-word wows" for The Ritz-Carlton, 2014
- "Tori 500" campaign for Lexus, 2014
- Lexus RC F ad, 2015
- 1000 video ads for Facebook campaign, 2015
- Trailer for 2K Games' Evolve, 2015
- Lexus Lane Valet April Fools' Day Promotion, 2016

== Virtual Reality Lab ==
Team One executives launched an in-house VR Lab in April 2016 focusing on experimentation and exploring the best way to tell brand stories through VR.

== The Legacy Lab ==
Legacy Lab is a consulting practice launched by Team One in 2012 that researches brand endurance. The Lab has researched brands including The Bluebird Cafe, It Gets Better Project, Girls Who Code, The Ritz-Carlton, The Championships, Wimbledon and Taylor Guitars and publishes many of its findings online. Mark Miller, Founder of The Legacy Lab, co-authored Legacy In The Making that offers a blueprint for building enduring brands in a short-term world. The book won the 2020 American American Marketing Association Leonard L. Berry award and was named a Forbes Top Ten Business Books. In 2023, The Legacy Lab launched the award-winning Legacy In The Making Docuseries in partnership with Fast Company.

In 2016, The Legacy Lab received a Jay Chiat Award from the American Association of Advertising Agencies for its redesign work for Me & the Bees.
