= Peter Deming =

American cinematographer

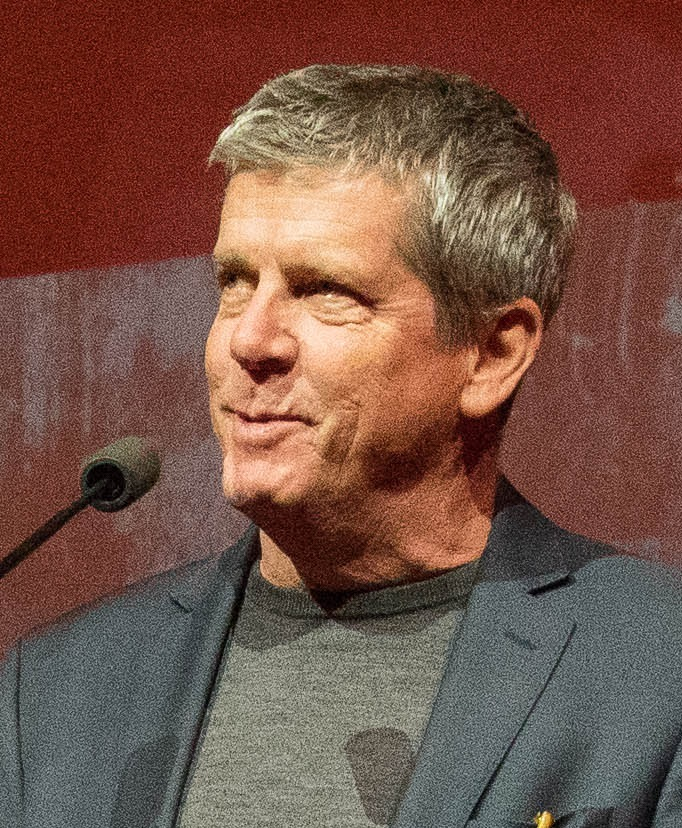
- Born: 13 December 1957 (age 68); Beirut, Lebanon
- Education: University of Wisconsin; American Film Institute
- Years active: 1982–present

Peter Deming, ASC (born December 13, 1957) is a Lebanese-born American cinematographer, best known for his works in horror and comedy films, winning the Independent Spirit Award for Best Cinematography for David Lynch's Mulholland Drive (2001).

== Career ==
Deming was educated at the University of Wisconsin and the American Film Institute.

He began working as a cinematographer in the 1980s, with early features including Sam Raimi's Evil Dead II (1987) and Robert Townsend's Hollywood Shuffle (1987) before working in comedies like My Cousin Vinny (1992) and Austin Powers: International Man of Mystery (1997).

Deming first worked with David Lynch in 1992, shooting six episodes of the short-lived comedy series On the Air. Lynch subsequently engaged him for the feature Lost Highway (1997), Mulholland Drive (2001), and the television revival Twin Peaks, for which received a Primetime Emmy Award nomination. Deming has said that Lynch was precise about shot lists but left lighting decisions to him, with the instruction "dark should be darker".

== Filmography ==
=== Feature film ===
Year	Title	Director
1987	Evil Dead II	Sam Raimi
1987	Hollywood Shuffle	Robert Townsend
1988	It Takes Two	David Beaird
1988	Scarecrows	William Wesley
1988	The Carrier	Nathan J. White
1988	From Hollywood to Deadwood	Rex Pickett
1988	Purple People Eater	Linda Shayne
1989	Martians Go Home	David Odell
1990	Why Me?	Gene Quintano
1990	House Party	Reginald Hudlin
1990	Book of Love	Robert Shaye
1991	Drop Dead Fred	Ate de Jong
1991	Scorchers	David Beaird
1992	My Cousin Vinny	Jonathan Lynn
1993	Loaded Weapon 1	Gene Quintano
1993	Son in Law	Steve Rash
1994	S.F.W.	Jefery Levy
1996	Joe's Apartment	John Payson
1997	Lost Highway	David Lynch
1997	Austin Powers: International Man of Mystery	Jay Roach
1997	Scream 2	Wes Craven
1999	Music of the Heart	Wes Craven
1999	Mystery, Alaska	Jay Roach
2000	Scream 3	Wes Craven
2001	Mulholland Drive	David Lynch
2001	From Hell	Hughes brothers
2002	Coney Island Baby	Amy Hobby
2002	Austin Powers in Goldmember	Jay Roach
2002	People I Know	Daniel Algrant
2004	Twisted	Philip Kaufman
2004	I Heart Huckabees	David O. Russell
2005	The Jacket	John Maybury
2005	Rumor Has It	Rob Reiner
2007	Lucky You	Curtis Hanson
2007	Married Life	Ira Sachs
2008	The Love Guru	Marco Schnabel
2009	Drag Me to Hell	Sam Raimi
2010	Last Night	Massy Tadjedin
2011	Scream 4	Wes Craven
2011	The Cabin in the Woods	Drew Goddard
2013	Oz the Great and Powerful	Sam Raimi
2016	Now You See Me 2	Jon M. Chu
2020	Capone	Josh Trank
2020	The New Mutants	Josh Boone
2022	The Menu	Mark Mylod
2022	Shotgun Wedding	Jason Moore
2026	The Whisper Man	James Ashcroft

Acting roles

Year	Title	Role	Notes
1997	Scream 2	Popcorn boy	
2000	Scream 3	Man Eating Popcorn on Studio Tour	Uncredited

=== Television ===
Year	Title	Director	Notes
1992	On the Air	Lesli Linka Glatter; Jack Fisk; Jonathan Sanger; Betty Thomas	6 episodes
1993	Key West	David Beaird; Chuck Bowman; James Frawley	3 episodes
2008	Cashmere Mafia	Peyton Reed	Episode "Pilot"
2016	The Toycracker: A Mini-Musical Spectacular	Andreas Nilsson; Henry Sedler; Paul Nguyen	TV short; With Robert Yeoman
2017	Twin Peaks	David Lynch	Season 3
2026	Spider-Noir	Alethea Jones	Episodes "Betrayal" and "Nightmare on a Gurney"

Miniseries

Year	Title	Director	Notes
1993	Hotel Room	David Lynch; James Signorelli	
2020	The Good Lord Bird		
2023	The Continental: From the World of John Wick	Albert Hughes	Episode "Night 3: Theatre of Pain"
2025	The Residence	Jaffar Mahmood	4 episodes

TV movies

Year	Title	Director	Notes
1994	Cosmic Slop	Reginald Hudlin; Warrington Hudlin; Kevin Rodney Sullivan	
1994	Last Days of Russell	Reginald Hudlin	With Brett King
2000	If These Walls Could Talk 2	Anne Heche	Segment "2000"

== Awards and nominations ==
Year	Award	Category	Title	Result
1990	Independent Spirit Awards	Best Cinematography	House Party	Nominated
2001	Independent Spirit Awards	Best Cinematography	Mulholland Drive	Won
2001	New York Film Critics Circle	Best Cinematographer	Mulholland Drive	Nominated
2001	Chicago Film Critics Association	Best Cinematography	Mulholland Drive	Nominated
2017	Primetime Emmy Awards	Outstanding Cinematography	Twin Peaks	Nominated
