= Ron Yuan =

American actor

- Born: Ronald Winston Yuan; New York City, U.S.
- Occupations: Actor; director; martial artist; stunt choreographer
- Years active: 1991–present

Ron Yuan
- Chinese: 袁文忠
Transcriptions
Standard Mandarin
- Hanyu Pinyin: Yuán Wénzhōng

Ronald Winston Yuan is an American actor, martial artist, director, and stunt choreographer. He is best known for his roles on Sons of Anarchy, Prison Break, Golden Boy, and CSI: NY. He has acted in numerous films, including an ensemble lead as Sgt. Qiang in Disney's live-action adaptation Mulan. He also voiced Sgt. Fideltin Rusk in the video game series Star Wars: The Old Republic, and Scorpion in Mortal Kombat 11.

== Early life ==
Yuan was born in New York City, New York, the son of Theresa and Joseph Yuan, and the brother of actor Roger Yuan.

== Career ==
=== Acting ===
==== Film ====
Yuan appeared in Roland Emmerich's Independence Day sequel, Independence Day: Resurgence, playing Yeong, the main weapons engineer. Before that, Yuan appeared in the film The Accountant (directed by Gavin O'Connor), with Ben Affleck, J. K. Simmons and Anna Kendrick, playing a reluctant Silat master. Yuan had a cameo in Martin Scorsese's Revenge of the Green Dragons, directed by Andrew Lau (Infernal Affairs) and Andrew Loo, playing the feared leader of the notorious BTK. Yuan also joined Francesca Eastwood and Annie Q. in Cardinal X, produced by Richard Bosner (Fruitvale Station) and Cassian Elwes in a semi-autobiographical film from first time director Angie Wang based on a college freshman in the 1980s who becomes an expert manufacturer and dealer of ecstasy.

Yuan also had memorable turns on hit films The Art of War, Fast & Furious, Cradle 2 the Grave, Blood and Bone, and Red Dawn.

==== TV ====
Yuan was a series regular on the Netflix show, the Weinstein Company's Marco Polo created by John Fusco. Yuan plays Prince Nayan, a fiery eyed descendant of Genghis Khan. Nayan is a converted Christian that rules all of Manchuria and whose closely watched actions will affect Kublai's control of Asia.

Yuan has also appeared on Jon Bokenkamp's hit show The Blacklist as mysterious Blacklister Quon Zhang. Yuan was also seen in the final season of Sons of Anarchy as the intense and unpredictable Ryu Tom. Yuan played hard-nosed Lt. Peter Kang in the short lived CBS series Golden Boy from Nicholas Wootton and Greg Berlanti. Yuan also had recent cameo special guest appearances on the TV shows Castle and Justified. Yuan also played the iconic Japanese character Scorpion for Warner Bros' secret Mortal Kombat X "Generations".

In the past, Yuan was cast in a leading role on HBO pilot All Signs of Death opposite Ben Whishaw, directed by Alan Ball (True Blood). Yuan recently had character arcs on FOX's Touch opposite Kiefer Sutherland created by Tim Kring (Heroes), NBC's Awake opposite Jason Isaacs and FOX pilot "Exit Strategy" with Ethan Hawke directed by Antoine Fuqua (Training Day).

Yuan also had memorable turns on other hit series Prison Break, CSI: NY, 24, Burn Notice, NCIS: Los Angeles, Pushing Daisies, and Entourage.

==== Video game voicework ====
Yuan has also voiced characters in major video or computer games such as Call of Duty: Black Ops 2, Halo, Star Wars: The Old Republic, Resident Evil, World of Warcraft, Medal of Honor, Army of Two, Guild Wars 2, Deus Ex, Uncharted, Red Alert 3, Mortal Kombat 11, Fallout: New Vegas and many more.

=== Action directing and choreography ===
Yuan designed the fight sequences as well as going behind camera as Action Director for Steve Chasman/ Jason Statham's "Wild Card" scripted by William Goldman and directed by Simon West. Yuan just finished designing and directing the action on the popular Taiwanese/ Chinese/ International action franchise "PiZi Ying Xiong 2"(Black&White 2) shot entirely in Taiwan.

=== Directing and writing ===
He has directed and written several short films so far, including Lollipops (2009), Three Bullets (2009) (starring Michael Jai White) and Tea and Remembrance (2009), starring himself and Marie Matiko. He is currently working on a feature project entitled "Unspoken" starring Russell Wong, Brian Tee, Will Yun Lee, and Ian Anthony Dale.

Yuan later directed Step Up: Year of the Dance, a Chinese dance film of the Step Up franchise.

== Filmography ==
=== Film ===
Year	Film	Role	Notes
1991	Ring of Fire	Li	
1992	Street Crimes	Jimmy	Credited as Ron Winston Yuan
1993	Ring of Fire II: Blood and Steel	Han Lo	Video
1993	To Be the Best	Han Lo	Video
1994	Bloodfist V: Human Target	Sam	Video
1994	Vanishing Son III	Pink Knight #1	TV movie
1994	Vanishing Son IV	Pink Knight #2	TV movie
1994	Double Dragon	Ninja Wrath	
1994	Deadly Target	"Lucky"	
1995	The Adventurers	Paul	
1995	Jade	Technician	
1996	White Tiger	Severin	Credited as Ron Winston Yuan
1996	Night Hunter	Hashimoto	Credited as Ron Winston Yuan
1996	Tiger Heart	Johnny	
1997	Drive	"Razor Scarred"	
1997	Fakin' Da Funk	Chinese Waiter	
1999	Godzilla 2000	Katagiri	Voice only
2000	Deep Core	Chin Li	
2000	The Art of War	Ming	
2001	Golden Dreams	The Chinese Man	Short film
2001	Shaolin Soccer	The Referee	Voice only
2001	Three Blind Mice	Vietnamese Man #3	TV movie
2001	Longshot	Friend #4	
2002	Kung Pow! Enter the Fist	Gang Fighter #2	
2003	Cradle 2 the Grave	Laser Tech	
2003	Timecop 2: The Berlin Decision	Ling	Video
2003	Ella Enchanted	Red Guard	Uncredited
2005	Color Blind	Drug Dealer	
2005	Forbidden Warrior	Lank	
2006	Fifty Pills	The Seoul Man	
2006	Undoing	Chang	
2007	Baby	Tommy	
2007	Adventures of Johnny Tao	Lee Chang	
2008	American Crude	The Guard	
2008	Mask of the Ninja	Kunio	TV movie
2008	6th and Santa Fe	Actor	Short film
2009	Fast & Furious	David Park	
2009	From Mexico with Love	Joe "Scar"	Cameo
2009	Tea and Remembrance	The Lone Man	
2009	Blood and Bone	Teddy "Teddy D"	
2010	The Godmother	Danny Wu	Short film
2010	Cinder		Short film
2010	The New Adventures of Johnny Karate and Golden Delicious	The Narrator	Short film
2010	All Signs of Death	Po Sin	
2011	Shanghai Hotel	Sharkman	
2012	The Girl from the Naked Eye	Simon	
2012	Mission Chinese	Master Gangster	Short film
2012	Red Dawn	The Clerk	Uncredited
2013	Olympus Has Fallen	Undercover Commando	Uncredited
2014	Mall	Cop	
2014	Revenge of the Green Dragons	Born to Kill Dai Lo	
2015	Underdog Kids	Marc Zuko	
2015	Cardinal X	Michael	
2016	Black Salt	Mamori Shiga	
2016	Black Thread	Masanori Ozeki	
2016	Birth of the Dragon	Tony Yu	
2016	The Accountant	Pencak Silat Master	
2016	Independence Day: Resurgence	Yeong	
2020	Mulan	Sergeant Qiang	
2020	The Paper Tigers	Hing	
2022	Catwoman: Hunted	Dr. Tzin	Voice role, direct-to-video
2022	Mortal Kombat Legends: Snow Blind	Sub-Zero	Voice role, direct-to-video
2022	The Wind & the Reckoning	Lee	
2023	The Monkey King	Babbo	Voice role

=== Television ===
Year	Title	Role	Note
1995	Vanishing Son	Crazy Boy 6	Episode: "Single Flame" (uncredited)
1997	The Pretender	Ken Watanabe	Episode: "Jaroldo!"; credited as Ron Winston Yuan
1997	Walker, Texas Ranger	Jiang Chu	Episode: "Heart of the Dragon"; credited as Ron Winston Yuan
1997	Pensacola: Wings of Gold	Phan Van Tung	Episode: "Past Sins"; credited as Ron Winston Yuan
1998	Dr. Quinn, Medicine Woman	Mr. Zou	Episode: "Life in the Balance"
1998-1999	Nash Bridges	Darrell Chang, Drug Dealer / Elliott Wong / Henchman #1	Episodes: "Crosstalk Drug Dealer", "Goodbye Kiss", "Special Delivery"
1998-2001	V.I.P.	The Actor / Hirata The Black / "Lucky" / Kazuo	Episodes: "Crouching Tiger, Hidden Val" (uncredited), "Magnificent Val", "Mao Better Blues" (uncredited), "Vallery of the Dolls"
1999	Martial Law	"Dreads"	Episode: "How Sammo Got His Groove Back" (uncredited)
1999	L.A. Heat	Marco	Episode: "Little Saigon"
2000	JAG	Lee Kun-Tae	Episode: "The Bridge at Kang So Ri"
2000	Son of the Beach	Johnny Tree	Episode: "With Sex You Get Eggroll"
2000	The Fearing Mind	Frank Wong	Episode: "The Fortunate One"
2002	Family Law	Officer Fox	Episode: "Children of a Lesser Dad"
2002	Alias	Haz Mat Guy	Episode: "The Enemy Walks In"
2002	Robbery Homicide Division	Vinh	Episode: "Life is Dust"
2003	The Agency	Reza Ghani / Gunart Everwood	Episode: "Debbie Does Djkarta"
2003	Black Sash	Jing Li / Billy	Episodes: "The Prodigal Son", "Pilot"
2004	Boston Legal	Zhang Wu	Episode: "Questionable characters"
2005	Monk	Tommy Winn	Episode: "Mr. Monk Gets Cabin Fever" (uncredited)
2005	Entourage	Chaing Chung	Episode: "Chinatown"
2005	CSI: NY	Dr. Evan Zao	Episodes: "Corporate Warriors", "Zoo york", "Grand Murder at Central Station", "Summer in the City"
2005	Sleeper Cell	"Cornrow"	Episode: "Family" (uncredited)
2007	24	Zhou's Team Member #1	Episodes: "Day 6: 2:00 a.m. - 3:00 a.m.", "Day 6 3:00 a.m. - 4:00 a.m."
2007	Cold Case	Shinji Nakamura	Episode: "Family 8108"
2008	Pushing Daises	"Shrimp Boy"	Episode: "Dim Some Lose Some"
2008	Prison Break	Feng Huan	Episodes: "Deal or No Deal", "Selfless", "Quiet Riot", "The Price", "Safe and Sound", "Eagles and Angels"
2010	Burn Notice	Lee	Episode: "Fast Friends"
2010	NCIS: Los Angeles	Yosh	Episode: "Honor"
2010	Touch	Wember Hsu	Episode: "Entanglement"
2010	Awake	Solomon Kang	Episode: "Game Day"
2012	Tron: Uprising		Episode: "Scars, Part 1"
2013	Golden Boy	Lieutenant Peter Kang	Episodes: "Next Question", "Beast of Burden", "Longshot", "Sacrifice", "Atonement", "Scapegoat", "McKenzie on Fire", "Just Say No", "Vicious Cycle" "Role Models", "Young Guns" "The Price of Revenge", "Pilot"
2014	Justified	Simon Lee	Episode: "A Murder of Crowes"
2014	Castle	Michio Saito	Episode: "The Way of the Ninja"
2014	Hawaii Five-0	Al Mokuau	Episode: "Ke Kono Mamao Aku"
2015	Mortal Kombat X: Generations	Hanzo Hasashi / Scorpion	Episode: "The Cursed Words"
2015	We Are Fathers	Qing Zhuo	Episodes: "End of Jin", "Enter the Tiger Den"
2016	Marco Polo	Prince Nayan	Episodes 1, 2, 4, 7, 8, 10 (season 2)
2018-2019	Siren	Agent Aldon Decker	
2021	Pacific Rim: The Black	Shiro Ito	
2022	Blood & Treasure	Batu / The Great Khan	Recurring role
2022	Ark: The Animated Series	Han Li	
2024	The Brothers Sun	Frank Ma	Episodes 6, 7, 8
2025	Grosse Pointe Garden Society	Keith	Season 1

=== Video games ===
Year	Video game	Role	Note
2004	Wrath Unleashed	Epothos	
2004	The Chronicles of Riddick: Escape from Butcher bay	Matthies / Monster / Wpminer	
2004	GoldenEye: Rogue Agent	Additional voices	
2005	S.W.A.T. 4	Male Suspect #1 / Lian Niu / Simon Gowan	
2005	50 Cent: Bulletproof	Triad	
2006	SWAT 4: The Stetchkov Syndicate	Male Suspect 1 / Andrew Norman	
2006	Full Spectrum Warrior: Ten Hammers	Sergeant Williams	
2007	Def Jam: Icon	The Narrator	
2007	Command and Conquer 3: Tiberium Wars	Dr. Takeda	
2007	Spider-Man 3	Dragon Tail Thug / Additional voices	
2007	Guild Wars: Eye of the North	Captain	
2007	Timeshift	Police 3 Commander	
2008	Speed Racer	Kakoii Teppodama	
2008	Command & Conquer: Red Alert 3	Crown Prince Tatsu	
2009	Command & Conquer: Red Alert 3 - Uprising	Crown Prince Tatsu	
2009	Prototype	Commander	
2009	Indiana Jones and the Staff of Kings	Tong Thug	
2009	Wet	Ratboy / Dr. Afro	
2010	Army of Two: The 40th Day	Wu	
2010	Socom U.S. Navy Seals: Fireteam Bravo 3	Additional voices	
2010	Alpha Protocol	Omen Deng / Triads	
2010	Medal of Honor	Bagram N.C.O. / SPC Song	
2010	Fallout: New Vegas	Ignacio Rivas / Tommy Torini / Paladin Ramos / Additional voices	
2011	Spider-Man: Edge of Time	Additional voices	
2011	Uncharted 3: Drake's Deception	Multiplayer Characters	
2011	Saints Row: The Third	Pedestrian / Additional Voices	
2011	Star Wars: The Old Republic	Sergeant Rusk / Additional voices	
2012	Sleeping Dogs	Mr. Chow / Ponytail / Mr. Tong / Additional voices	
2012	Guild Wars 2	PC Charr Male	
2012	Resident Evil 6	BSAA	
2012	Nightmare in North Point	Dogeyes	
2012	Halo 4	Additional voices	
2012	Call of Duty: Black Ops II	Chinese Commando	
2013	Star Wars: The Old Republic - Rise of the Hutt Cartel	Sergeant Rusk	
2013	Saints Row IV	The Voices of Virtual Steelport	
2013	Battlefield 4	Various voices	
2014	Elder Scrolls Online	Various voices	
2014	World of Warcraft: Warlords of Draenor	Various voices	
2014	Star Wars: The Old Republic - Shadow of Revan	Sergeant Rusk	
2015	Guild Wars 2: Heart of Thorns	PC Charr Male	
2015	Call of Duty: Black Ops III	Additional voices	
2015	Star Wars: The Old Republic - Knights of the Fallen Empire	Fideltin Rusk	
2016	Star Wars: The Old Republic - Knights of the Eternal Throne	Additional voices	
2019	Mortal Kombat 11	Scorpion	
2020	Yakuza: Like a Dragon	Taiga Saejima	
2023	Mortal Kombat: Onslaught	Scorpion	
2023	Like a Dragon Gaiden: The Man Who Erased His Name	Taiga Saejima	
2024	Like a Dragon: Infinite Wealth	Taiga Saejima	
2025	Yakuza 0 Director's Cut	Taiga Saejima	
