= Leland Crooke =

American actor

Leland Crooke is an American actor from stage and film. He is known from several stage plays and films by David Beaird.

== Career ==
In February 1980, Crooke gave his stage debut in the play Bal (Richard Nelson's loose adaptation of Bertolt Brecht's play Baal with James Belushi in title role) which was staged at the Goodman Theatre in Chicago. In October of the same year he was cast as Swiss Cheese, the youngest son of Mother Courage in Sharon Ott's adaption of Brecht's play Mother Courage and Her Children at the Milwaukee Repertory Theater in Milwaukee, Wisconsin. In 1981 he was seen as Lackey (a musketeer) in Cyrano de Bergerac at the same theatre.

In 1984, he met director, screenwriter, and playwright David Beaird with whom he collaborated in the films The Party Animal (1984), My Chauffeur (1986), It Takes Two, Pass the Ammo (both 1988), Scorchers (1991), and The Civilization of Maxwell Bright (2005). Crooke was also seen in Beaird's stage plays Scorchers (1985, in the role of Jumper at the Equity Waiver Theater in Los Angeles) and 900 Oneonta (1999, in the role of Dandy at the Odyssey Theatre in Los Angeles). In addition Crooke played guest roles in television series including Key West (created by Beaird), Matlock, Melrose Place, ER, Star Trek: Deep Space Nine, Buffy the Vampire Slayer, JAG, Angel, and Charmed.
