= Timothy Carhart =

American actor

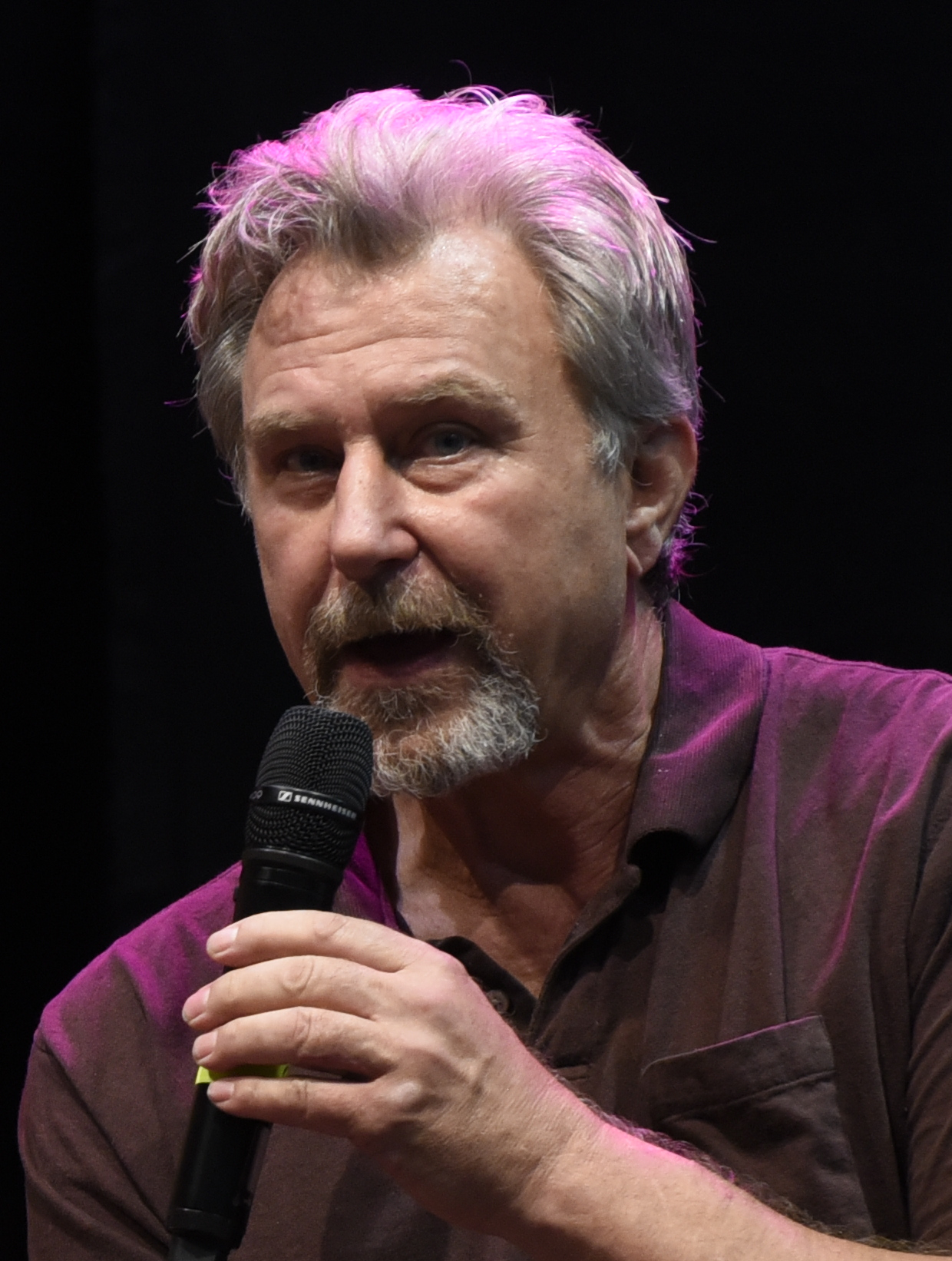
- Carhart in 2018
- Born: Timothy Grunig; December 24, 1953 (age 72); Washington, D.C., U.S.
- Occupation: Actor
- Years active: 1970s–present

Timothy Carhart (born December 24, 1953) is an American actor. He starred in the CBS drama Island Son (1989–90) and has had recurring roles in CSI: Crime Scene Investigation (2000–03) and 24 (2002). He also starred in the 1992 Broadway revival of A Streetcar Named Desire. His film appearances include Ghostbusters (1984), Pink Cadillac (1989), Thelma & Louise (1991), Beverly Hills Cop III (1994), and Motocrossed (2001).

== Early life ==
Carhart was born Timothy Grunig in Washington, D.C. and attended junior high and high school in Evanston, Illinois. He travelled to İzmir and Ankara in Turkey, and to Verdun in France, before returning to the U.S. and studying theater.

== Television work ==
Carhart made his television acting debut in NBC's 1978 mini-series The Awakening Land. Throughout the 1980s, Carhart made guest appearances on several television series, including Alfred Hitchcock Presents, Miami Vice and Crime Story. Carhart also appeared in two episodes of the crime drama Spenser: For Hire. He played Richard in the Tales from the Darkside episode (2/10) "Ursu Minor" (1985).

In 1989, Carhart had a recurring role on the drama series Thirtysomething and was a regular on the CBS medical drama series Island Son.

Carhart has made guest appearances on a number of science fiction shows including in 1991 where he appeared in Quantum Leap, the time travel series starring Scott Bakula and Dean Stockwell. Later that year he appeared in an episode of Star Trek: The Next Generation, "Redemption (Part 2)". In 1995, Carhart was a guest star on The X-Files, appearing as Virgil Incanto in the episode "2Shy".

Other television shows on which Carhart guest-starred during the 1990s include Midnight Caller, Empty Nest, Roseanne, The Young Riders, L.A. Law, Law & Order, Strange World and Profiler.

Carhart appeared in several made-for-TV movies during the 1990s, including Call Me Anna (1990), Quicksand: No Escape (1992) Smoke Jumpers (1996), America's Dream (1996) and Before Carhart Wakes (1998). Carhart also starred in two mini-series from CBS, In a Child's Name (1991) and Gone in the Night (1996).

Between 2000 and 2003, Carhart played the recurring role of Eddie Willows on the hit CBS crime drama CSI: Crime Scene Investigation in four episodes. In 2002, he had a recurring role on the hit Fox series 24, playing Assistant NSA head Eric Rayburn in four episodes.

Carhart has also made guest appearances on shows such as The Practice, UPN's The Twilight Zone, Frasier, Judging Amy, Standoff and a 2007 episode of Law & Order: Criminal Intent entitled "Silencer".

He also made a guest appearance on Criminal Minds in the season 4 episode, "Roadkill", as Detective Quinn who calls for the BAU to help investigate after a series of homicides occur that appear to have been caused by a serial killer's car near Bend, Oregon.

== Film work ==
Two of Carhart's earliest film credits were the 1984 blockbuster horror comedy Ghostbusters and the independent comedy The Party Animal.

In 1985, Carhart had a supporting role in the Academy Award-winning drama Witness and the popular romantic comedy film Desperately Seeking Susan. In the former, he played a supporting role as an undercover narcotics officer whose brutal murder sets the story in motion. Also in 1985, he appeared in the drama film Marie.

In 1986, Carhart appeared in three films: Sweet Liberty, The Manhattan Project and Playing for Keeps.

He played the second male lead in the adventure drama The Rescue (1988) and the action comedy Pink Cadillac (1989). In addition, Carhart can be seen in the hit 1988 comedy film Working Girl.

He appeared in such films as Thelma & Louise (1991), Red Rock West (1992) The Hunt for Red October, Beverly Hills Cop III (1994), Candyman: Farewell to the Flesh (1995), Black Sheep (1996), Air Force One (1997) and Motocrossed (2001).

Carhart was in the 2005 direct-to-DVD Steven Seagal film Black Dawn.

== Stage work ==
In 1987, Carhart starred in a stage production of Don DeLillo's play The Day Room at the New York City Center. For his performance in this production, he was nominated for the 1988 Drama Desk Award for Outstanding Ensemble Acting.

On Broadway, Carhart played Harold "Mitch" Mitchell in the 1992 revival of Tennessee Williams' A Streetcar Named Desire.

== Filmography ==
=== Film ===
| Year | Title | Role | Notes |
|---|---|---|---|
| 1983 | Summerspell | Cecil Jr. | Credited as Tim Carhart |
| 1984 | Ghostbusters | Violinist | Named as Andre Wallance in the novelization |
| 1984 | The Party Animal | Studly | Credited as Tim Carhart |
| 1985 | Witness | Zenovich | |
| 1985 | Desperately Seeking Susan | Victoria's Boyfriend | |
| 1985 | Marie | Clayton Dawson | |
| 1986 | Sweet Liberty | Eagleton, Stunt Coordinator | |
| 1986 | Playing for Keeps | Emmett | |
| 1986 | The Manhattan Project | Relief Guard | |
| 1988 | The Rescue | Lieutenant Phillips | |
| 1988 | Lovers, Partners & Spies | Jack Smith | |
| 1988 | Working Girl | Tim Draper | Credited as Tim Carhart |
| 1989 | Pink Cadillac | Roy McGuinn | |
| 1990 | The Hunt for Red October | Bill Steiner | |
| 1991 | Thelma & Louise | Harlan Puckett | |
| 1993 | Red Rock West | Deputy Gretack | |
| 1993 | Heaven & Earth | Big Mike | |
| 1994 | Beverly Hills Cop III | Ellis De Wald | |
| 1995 | Candyman: Farewell to the Flesh | Paul McKeever | |
| 1996 | Black Sheep | Roger Kovary | |
| 1997 | Air Force One | Secret Service Agent at Checkpoint | Uncredited |
| 2005 | The Moor | Warren Low | Short film |
| 2005 | Black Dawn | Greer | Direct-to-video |
| 2016 | The Remake | Francis Zelski | |
| 2017 | F***, Marry, Kill | Sheriff | Short film |
| 2019 | Cleanin' Up the Town: Remembering Ghostbusters | Himself | Documentary film |

=== Television ===
| Year | Title | Role | Notes |
|---|---|---|---|
| 1978 | The Awakening Land | Stranger / First Peddler | Miniseries (2 episodes) |
| 1985 | Tales from the Darkside | Richard | "Ursa Minor" (credited as Tim Carhart) |
| 1986 | Alfred Hitchcock Presents | Rick | "The Creeper" |
| 1986 | Miami Vice | George T. Wyatt | "Shadow in the Dark" |
| 1986–87 | Spenser: For Hire | Georgie Harley / Jim Gullen | 2 episodes |
| 1987 | Another World | Ken Barton | "#1.5795" |
| 1987 | Leg Work | Terrence | "Pilot" |
| 1987 | Crime Story | Colonel Walker | "Atomic Fallout" |
| 1989 | thirtysomething | Matt Enwright | Recurring role (3 episodes) |
| 1989–1990 | Island Son | Dr. Anthony Metzger | Series regular (19 episodes) |
| 1990 | Midnight Caller | Kevin Loughery | "The Hostage Game" |
| 1990 | Call Me Anna | Harry | TV movie |
| 1990 | Empty Nest | Billy | "Whenever I Feel Afraid" |
| 1991 | Roseanne | Jonathan | "Becky Doesn't Live Here Anymore" |
| 1991 | The Young Riders | Colonel Matthew Curtis | "Face of the Enemy" |
| 1991 | Quantum Leap | Mac Ellroy | "Nuclear Family – October 26, 1962" |
| 1991 | Star Trek: The Next Generation | Lieutenant Commander Christopher Hobson | "Redemption II" |
| 1991 | In a Child's Name | Lieutenant Robert Fausak | Miniseries (2 episodes) |
| 1992 | L.A. Law | John Harvey | "Guess Who's Coming to Murder" |
| 1992 | Quicksand: No Escape | Charlie Groves | TV movie |
| 1992 | Nightmare Cafe | Detective Stan Gates | "The Heart of the Mystery" |
| 1994 | Dream On | Gregor | "Off-Off Broadway Bound" |
| 1995 | The X-Files | Virgil Incanto | "2Shy" |
| 1995 | The Client | Walon Clark | Recurring role (3 episodes) |
| 1996 | Smoke Jumpers | Tom Classen | TV movie |
| 1996 | America's Dream | Professor Daniel | TV movie segment "The Boy Who Painted Christ Black" |
| 1996 | Gone in the Night | Paul Hogan | TV movie |
| 1998 | To Live Again | Hank | TV movie |
| 1998 | Before He Wakes | Ron Michaels | TV movie |
| 1998 | Law & Order | Warren Abbott | "Tabloid" |
| 1998 | Four Corners | Sheriff | Recurring role (4 episodes) |
| 1999 | Strange World | Dr. Earl Rayder | "Spirit Falls" |
| 1999 | Profiler | Sheriff J.D. Tollman | "Las Brisas" |
| 1999 | The Price of a Broken Heart | Joe Hutlemeyer | TV movie |
| 2000 | Any Day Now | Clay Mitchell / Dr. Clay Mitchell | 2 episodes |
| 2000 | The Practice | Officer Paul Brewer | "We Hold These Truths..." Credited as Tim Carhart |
| 2000–2003 | CSI: Crime Scene Investigation | Eddie Willows | Recurring role (4 episodes) |
| 2001 | Motocrossed | Edward Carson | TV movie |
| 2001 | Love and Treason | Detective Johnny Blake | TV movie |
| 2002 | The Twilight Zone | Phillip MacIntosh | "Upgrade" |
| 2002 | 24 | Eric Rayburn | Recurring role (4 episodes) |
| 2003 | Touched by an Angel | Rob Kellerman | "A Time for Every Purpose" |
| 2003 | Frasier | Mr. Grant | "Some Assembly Required" |
| 2003 | The Matrix | CSAF Scott | "In Plane Sight" |
| 2004 | Judging Amy | Attorney Simon Edgars | "Dancing in the Dark" |
| 2005 | Wanted | Abel Pretotorio | "The Last Temptation" |
| 2006 | Standoff | Lucas Leeson | "One Shot Stop" |
| 2007 | Law & Order: Criminal Intent | Dr. Strauss | "Silencer" |
| 2009 | Criminal Minds | Detective Quinn | "Roadkill" |
| 2009 | Lie to Me | Jerry Conway | "Control Factor" |
| 2010 | Leverage | General Elias Atherton | "The Big Bang Job" |
| 2012 | Castle | Dr. Nelson Blakely | "Pandora" |
| 2012 | Mad Men | Jed Covington | "Commissions and Fees" |
| 2017 | Bromance | Mr. Garcia | TV movie |
| 2018–2020 | Yellowstone | A.G. Stewart | Recurring role (10 episodes) |

=== Theatre ===
| Year | Title | Role | Notes |
|---|---|---|---|
| 1987 | The Day Room | Unknown role | Nominated — Drama Desk Award for Outstanding Acting Ensemble |
| 1992 | A Street Car Named Desire | Harold Mitchell / Mitch | 137 performances + 31 previews |

=== Music videos ===
| Year | Title | Role | Notes |
|---|---|---|---|
| 1991 | Glenn Frey: "Part of Me, Part of You" | Harlan | From the motion picture Thelma & Louise |
