= Marty Ross =

Marty Ross may refer to:

- Marty Ross (musician)
- Marty Ross (writer)

== See also ==
- Martin Ross
