= Call Me Anna =

1990 American TV film

- Genre: Biography; Drama
- Based on: Call Me Anna by: Patty Duke; Kenneth Turan
- Written by: John McGreevey
- Directed by: Gilbert Cates
- Starring: Patty Duke; Timothy Carhart; Howard Hesseman; Deborah May; Ari Meyers; Millie Perkins
- Composer: Garry Sherman
- Country of origin: United States
- Original language: English

Production
- Executive producer: Sheldon Pinchuk
- Producers: Gilbert Cates; Anna Duke-Pearce
- Cinematography: Mark Irwin
- Editor: Lee Burch
- Running time: 97 minutes
- Production companies: Call Me Anna Company; Finnegan/Pinchuk Productions; Gilbert Cates Productions; Mianna Pearce Productions

Original release
- Network: ABC
- Release: November 11, 1990

Call Me Anna is a 1990 American made-for-television biographical drama film directed by Gilbert Cates and written by John McGreevey. It is based on the 1987 book Call Me Anna by Patty Duke and Kenneth Turan. The film stars Patty Duke, Timothy Carhart, Howard Hesseman, Deborah May, Ari Meyers and Millie Perkins. The film premiered on ABC on November 11, 1990.

== Plot ==
The film traces Duke’s rise to fame, beginning with her early years under the management of John and Ethel Ross, who changed her name from Anna Marie Duke to Patty Duke. It highlights her breakthrough role as Helen Keller in The Miracle Worker, for which she won an Academy Award at age 16. The narrative also explores her struggles with bipolar disorder, tumultuous personal relationships, and eventual advocacy for mental health awareness.

== Cast ==
- Patty Duke as Anna Marie Duke
  - Ari Meyers as Patty Duke (youth)
  - Jenny Robertson as Patty Duke (young adult)
- Arthur Taxier as John Astin
- Howard Hesseman as John Ross
- Deborah May as Ethel Ross
- Millie Perkins as Frances Duke
- Timothy Carhart as Harry Falk
- Matthew Perry as Desi Arnaz Jr.
- David Packer as Glenn Bell (pseudonym for Michael Tell)
- Karl Malden as Dr. Harold Arlen
- Woody Eney as Fred Coe
- Dana Gladstone as Fred Maxwell
- François Giroday as Bob McLaren
- Lora Staley as Anne Bancroft
- Ray Duke as John Patrick Duke
- Glenn Quinn as George Chakiris
- Cory Danziger as Sean Astin
  - Zachary Benjamin as Sean Astin (young)
- Ryan Francis as Mackie Astin
- Matthew Linville as Mackie Astin (young)
- Paige Gosney as Billy
- Seth Isler as Game Show Producer
- Nicholas Hormann as Game Show Host
- Richard Fancy as Contract Lawyer

== Reception ==
The original airing of the film ranked 18th out of 93 shows airing the week of November 5–11, 1990. It earned a 15.9 rating and a 24 share, ranking second in its time slot.
