= Forbidden Warrior =

- Directed by: Jimmy Nickerson
- Written by: Glen Hartford and Daniel Toll
- Starring: Marie Matiko, Sung Kang, Karl Yune
- Music by: Mike Verta
- Release date: November 2005
- Country: United States
- Language: English

Forbidden Warrior is a 2005 martial arts fantasy action film starring Marie Matiko, Sung Kang and Karl Yune. It was directed by Jimmy Nickerson, and produced by Glen Hartford and Daniel Toll. The film is notable in resembling a low-budget Hong Kong action film, despite its American production and cast. A review in Variety noted that characters from a Chinese myth are given Japanese names and played by caucasians.

In a 2006 interview, the writer/producer Glen Hartford claims he based the story on "a piece of mythological history, from over 4000 years ago", and calls the movie an "Asian film".

== Cast ==
- Marie Matiko as Seki
- Sung Kang as Doran
- Karl Yune as Locust
- Tony Amendola as Ajis-Aka
- James Hong as Muraji, The Warlord
- Andrew Divoff as Ujis-Aka
- Musetta Vander as Reza
- Chris Coppola as Jibberish
- Bruce Locke as Miyamoto
- Kay E. Kuter as Yawn
- Ron Yuan as Lank
- Kristina Wayborn as Sorceress
- Vladimir Cuk as Tall Tall
