= David Beaird =

American director, playwright, and screenwriter (1952–2019)

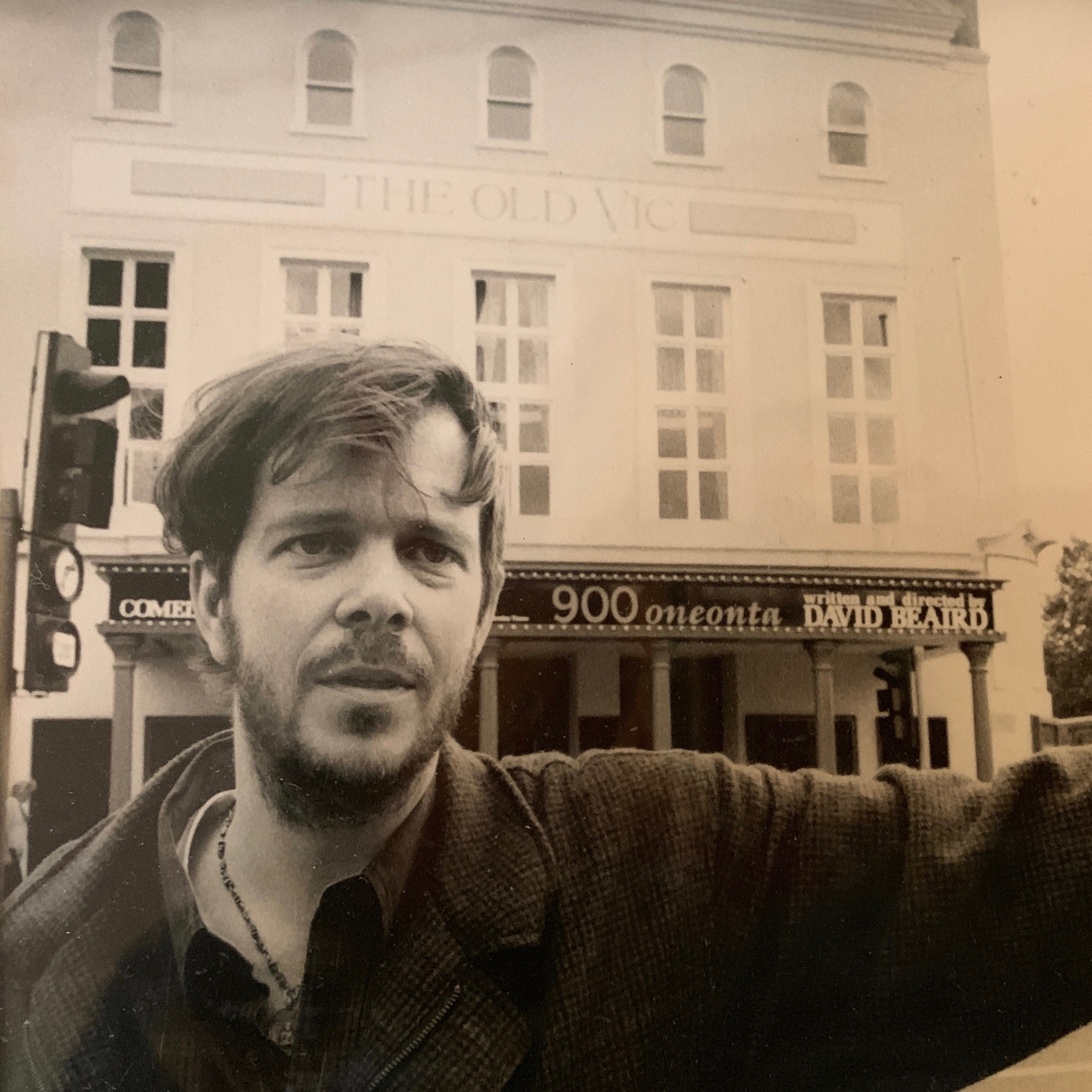
- Beaird at the opening of his play 900 Oneonta, Old Vic theatre, London, 1994
- Born: August 19, 1952; Shreveport, Louisiana, U.S.
- Died: February 6, 2019 (aged 66); Tarzana, California, U.S.
- Occupation(s): Film director, screenwriter, theatre director

David Hardin Beaird (August 19, 1952 – February 6, 2019) was an American film and stage director, screenwriter, and playwright. He was born in Shreveport, Louisiana.

== Career ==
In 1973, he was recipient of the Joseph Jefferson Award for Best Actor in a Supporting Role for his performance in the play The Hot l Baltimore at the Ivanhoe Theatre in Chicago, Illinois. In 1974 he founded the Wisdom Bridge Theatre which flourished after Robert Falls took the director's post in 1977. The theatre's name was inspired by a painting whose subtitle read: "The bridge to wisdom is the continual asking of questions."

Beaird's first feature film Octavia (1982) was about a blind woman who is raped by a motorcycle gang. His next film The Party Animal, a comedy, was released in 1984. In 1986, he came to wider prominence with the comedy My Chauffeur starring Deborah Foreman. In 1987, he shot the comedy Pass the Ammo and It Takes Two a year later.

Beaird founded the Whitefire Theatre in Sherman Oaks, California, and he staged a successful play titled Scorchers, a play he had written about a Cajun wedding night in the bayou. The play ran for at least two years and won several awards. In 1991, he adapted the play into the movie Scorchers, with Faye Dunaway, James Earl Jones, Emily Lloyd, Jennifer Tilly, and Leland Crooke in the leading roles.

In 1992, Beaird created the 13-part television series Key West in which an Ohio factory worker played by Fisher Stevens wins the lottery and goes to live the writer's life in Florida, with Hemingway as his inspiration.

In 1994, Beaird brought 900 Oneonta, a black comedy about a dysfunctional family, to the stage. It had its premiere at the Lyric Hammersmith in London. It later was staged in the Old Vic and then at the West End Theatre. The play was nominated for the Laurence Olivier Award for Best New Play. It was the last play at the Circle Repertory Theatre in New York City before it was closed in 1996. Eddie Izzard, Leland Crooke, Jon Cryer, and Douglas Henshall performed in the play.

Beaird married actress Shevonne Durkin in 2001.

Beaird's final film, released in 2005, was The Civilization of Maxwell Bright, starring Patrick Warburton, Marie Matiko, Jennifer Tilly, Eric Roberts, and Simon Callow. The film's subject, according to Beaird, was "how one person pulls the other out of hell." The film won awards at the Beverly Hills Film Festival, the WorldFest Houston and the Florida Film Festival in 2005.

Beaird died on February 6, 2019, in Tarzana, California.
