= The Art of War (film) =

2000 film by Christian Duguay

- Theatrical release poster
- Directed by: Christian Duguay
- Screenplay by: Wayne Beach; Simon Barry
- Story by: Wayne Beach
- Produced by: Nicolas Clermont
- Starring: Wesley Snipes; Anne Archer; Maury Chaykin; Marie Matiko; Cary-Hiroyuki Tagawa; Michael Biehn; Donald Sutherland
- Cinematography: Pierre Gill
- Edited by: Michel Arcand
- Music by: Normand Corbeil
- Production companies: Franchise Pictures; Amen Ra Films; Filmline International
- Distributed by: TVA Films (Canada); Morgan Creek Productions (through Warner Bros. Pictures; United States)
- Release date: August 25, 2000 (United States)
- Running time: 117 minutes
- Countries: Canada; United States
- Language: English
- Budget: $40-60 million
- Box office: $40.4 million

The Art of War is a 2000 Canadian-American action spy film directed by Christian Duguay and starring Wesley Snipes, Michael Biehn, Anne Archer and Donald Sutherland. It is the first installment in The Art of War film series, and was followed by two direct-to-video sequels, The Art of War II: Betrayal and The Art of War III: Retribution. The latter did not feature Snipes.

== Plot ==
Neil Shaw is an operative for the United Nations's covert SAD, using espionage and quasi-ethical tactics to secure peace and cooperation. In Hong Kong, Shaw infiltrates a Chinese New Year party held by Chinese business mogul David Chan and covertly hacks an office laptop of a North Korean Defense Minister, and blackmails him with the misappropriation of U.N. aid money, in exchange for continuing negotiations with South Korea. Shortly after being discovered, Shaw fights his way out of the party and suffers a gunshot wound to his shoulder during extraction.

Six months later, a shipping container full of dead Vietnamese refugees from Hong Kong turns up on the New York docks the same week as China's trade agreement with the U.S. Shaw's boss, Eleanor Hooks, suspects Chinese ambassador Wu's connection with the Chinese Triad, and assigns Shaw to plant a tracking device on Wu during a banquet held by Chan. During the trade agreement banquet, Wu is gunned down, Chan is shot in the arm, and Shaw pursues a masked gunman. During the pursuit, Shaw's teammate Robert Bly corners the gunman but perishes, and Shaw is arrested by the NYPD. In the middle of a prison transfer, FBI agent Frank Capella's van is disabled by a roadside bomb, and an unconscious Shaw is captured by Triad members to be framed for the murder and disposed of. Shaw regains consciousness and frees himself from captivity, only to find his last remaining team member, Jenna Novak, murdered by a Chinese hitman. Shaw kills the hitman, recovers the audio file, and secures weapons and equipment from Novak's hidden armory. Shaw seeks Julia Fang's help after reading a news article stating Shaw's innocence. Shaw manages to save Fang from an ambush by a Chinese hitwoman at a hospital.

With Fang's aid, Shaw finds a Triad-owned bakery serving as a front for a gentlemen's club, setting up an unlikely alliance with Capella, and retrieving video footage of Chan's role in derailing the trade agreement. Fang delivers the evidence to Hooks while Shaw confronts Chan at the same hotel where the banquet is being held. Chan is shot dead by a masked gunman while being interrogated by Shaw. The pursuit ends when Shaw finds a scanner that is tuned to a tracking device embedded in Shaw's gunshot wound before being ambushed by Bly. Bly reveals himself as the assassin at the banquet and also engineered the tracking device implant from an earlier basketball game injury. Hooks reviews the evidence and reveals that she and Chan were the masterminds behind the conspiracy. A disgusted Fang tries to leave but attempts to hide from Bly only to be locked in a bathroom. Shaw eventually figures out Hooks's role behind the conspiracy and approaches Capella with his findings. Shaw surgically removes his tracking device and uses Capella's business card to give the Triads a business proposition. Shaw breaks into the U.N. building and enters into a shootout and hand-to-hand fight with Bly, where the latter dies after falling on a shard from a broken glass pane. The following day, Shaw calls Hooks in her limousine and lectures her about karma, revealing that Shaw's business proposition to the Triads was to assassinate Hooks for her betrayal. Shaw fakes his death before reuniting with Fang in France but is monitored by an unknown spy.

== Cast ==
- Wesley Snipes as SAD Agent Neil Shaw
- Donald Sutherland as UN Secretary-General Douglas Thomas
- Maury Chaykin as FBI Agent Frank Capella
- Anne Archer as Eleanor Hooks
- Marie Matiko as Julia Fang
- Ron Yuan as Ming
- Michael Biehn as SAD Agent Robert Bly
- Cary-Hiroyuki Tagawa as David Chan
- Liliana Komorowska as SAD Agent Jenna Novak
- James Hong as Ambassador Wu
- Paul Hopkins as FBI Agent Ray
- Glen Chin as Defense Minister General Ochai
- Bonnie Mak as Anna Li
- Uni Park as Tina Chan
- Fernando Chien as Zeng Zi
- Paul Wu as "Shades"
- Noel Burton as Alex Wingate
- Mike Tsar as NYPD Lieutenant
- Steven P. Park as "Tattoo"

== Production ==
In June 1998, it was reported that Jet Li had entered into seven figure deal to star in The Art of War for producer Dan Halsted which would be a co-production for Oliver Stone's Illusion Entertainment and Dick Wolf's Wolf Films to be distributed by Universal Pictures and Alliance Films. The film was to follow a secret agent for the United Nations who becomes wrongfully accused of assassinating World Leaders and must then find the real killer to clear his name.

In February 1999, Elie Samaha and Stone entered into a three-picture co-financing deal which included The Art of War and would now be produced by Franchise Pictures, Stone's Illusion Entertainment, and Wesley Snipes' Amen Ra Films with Snipes also set to play the lead after Li dropped out. Stanley Tong was in negotiations to direct with distribution to be handled by Morgan Creek Entertainment and Warner Bros. Pictures via their output deal with Franchise Pictures. By April, Christian Duguay was set to direct. In May, Stone left the project as an executive producer following the dissolution of his company Illusion Entertainment instead preferring to focus on his own directorial efforts with projects under the company to continue under the stewardship of producer Dan Halsted. By August of that year, it was reported that Donald Sutherland had joined the cast.

== Reception ==
=== Box office ===
The film opened at #2 behind Bring It On, earning $10,410,993 in its opening weekend in the United States. The Art of War went on to gross $40.4 million worldwide, against its production budget of $40–60 million budget.

=== Critical response ===
On review aggregator Rotten Tomatoes, the film has an approval rating of 16% based on reviews from 81 critics, with an average rating of 3.8/10. The site's consensus says: "Excessively noisy and overly reliant on genre clichés, The Art of War wastes its star's charisma on a ridiculous, convoluted plot and poorly edited action sequences". On Metacritic, it has a score of 30 out of 100 based on reviews from 23 critics, indicating "generally unfavorable" reviews. Audiences surveyed by Cinemascore gave it a grade B. Emanuel Levy of Variety wrote: "Despite some effectively rousing set pieces, particularly in the long corridors of the U.N. building, The Art of War is ultimately much less than the sum of its parts". Stephen Holden of The New York Times called it "ludicrous, impenetrable and headache-inducing".

== Sequels ==
Wesley Snipes reprised his role as Neil Shaw in a straight-to-DVD sequel The Art of War II: Betrayal released in August 2008. Athena Karkanis and Lochlyn Munro also star in the film.

The third and final film The Art of War III: Retribution in the series stars Anthony "Treach" Criss, Sung-Hi Lee, Warren Derosa and David Basila.
