= The Party Animal =

1984 film by David Beaird

- The Party Animal DVD cover
- Directed by: David Beaird
- Written by: Alan C. Fox and David Beaird (story); David Beaird (screenplay)
- Produced by: Bryan England; Mark Israel
- Starring: Matthew Causey; Timothy Carhart; Jerry Jones; Suzanne Ashley
- Narrated by: Jerry Jones
- Cinematography: Bryan England
- Edited by: Susan Jenkins
- Production company: Moviestore Entertainment
- Distributed by: International Film Marketing
- Release dates: May 14, 1984 (Cannes); June 15, 1984 (United States)
- Running time: 78 minutes
- Country: United States
- Language: English

The Party Animal is a 1984 American comedy film written and directed by David Beaird. It was independently produced and was released across the United States, where it was critically derided, but did respectably well at the box office.

The film is a slapstick mockumentary-style comedy that spoofed the college campus sexploitation genre popularized by Animal House and Porky's. Though the movie was made on a shoestring budget, its soundtrack featured Buzzcocks, The Untouchables (who also perform in the film), The Fleshtones, The Convertables and Chelsea. The theme song for The Party Animal was "Why Can't I Touch It".

The film is available through MGM Home entertainment on a limited edition series of 80s comedies.

== Plot ==
The film begins with the strains of "Why Can't I Touch It" by Buzzcocks as the camera pans across a rural landscape to the face of a beautiful teenage girl (Susanne Ashley) who is atop a hill surveying the road below. An open-ended truck rolls into view bearing a young man lying on a pile of turnips. This is Pondo Sinatra (Matthew Causey), the star of the story, a 22-year-old virgin burdened with raging hormones, no sex appeal or social skills. He is on his way to his first day at college. Upon arrival, Pondo cannot help but notice that the university is full of attractive and scantily clad women but try as he might he is of no interest to them. The good looking and popular 'Studley' (Timothy Carhart) soon takes him under his wing and tries to teach him the ways of seduction, but Pondo's increasingly bizarre schemes fail spectacularly, even at the local whore house. Desperate to break what seems to be a curse, Pondo descends into suicidal depression at which point the college's wise janitor named Elbow (Jerry Jones) steps in and gives Pondo advice.

Pondos' schemes include a try at poetic seduction as Studley tells Pondo what to say to his vivacious date Natasha (Robin Harlan) via a remote microphone; sending Pondo to buy elegant new clothes (he goes to the Punk store by mistake and leaves looking like Quasimodo); taking massive quantities of drugs (which in reality would be lethal); and activating world's biggest vibrator, the Moby-M5, with disastrous consequences. The M-5 episode provides a pretext for two porn store employees to discuss strategic arms limitation treaties, using various dildos as props.

After one of these dating debacles, Pondo frightens Studley by shouting "I'd sell my soul for a piece of ass!" Meanwhile, Miranda (Susanne Ashley), a mysterious girl with supernatural powers who has been observing Pondo's struggles for some time, hears his cry and cryptically acknowledges it. Some time afterward, Pondo accidentally creates a chemical compound that makes him irresistible to women. At first he revels in his new "party animal" prowess; later, exhausted and terrified, he takes to barricading himself in his room to escape the mobs of obsessed women who pursue him everywhere. "I have been greedy," he confesses despairingly to Studley, "I am like King Midas; everything I touch turns to poontang!" The end of the film is tragic-comic with a metaphysical twist concerning the fate of those ruled by lust.

== Cast ==
- Matthew Causey - Pondo Sinatra
- Timothy Carhart - Studley
- Jerry Jones - Elbow
- Susanne Ashley - Miranda/Mother Nature
- Robin Harlan - Natasha
- Frank Galati - The Professor
- Luci Roucis - Sophia
- Joan Dykman - The Nurse
- Barbara Baylis - Madame
- Frannie James - Dean Fox
- Leland Crooke - Dean's Secretary
- Billi Gordon - The New Dean

== Soundtrack ==
The film contains numerous songs by The Fleshtones, Buzzcocks, Chelsea, The Untouchables, The Convertibles, and R.E.M.
