= Octavia (film) =

- Directed by: David Beaird
- Written by: David Beaird; Alan C. Fox
- Starring: Susan Curtis; Neil Kinsella; Jake Foley
- Release dates: May 24, 1982 (Cannes Film Market); 1984 (United States)

Octavia is a 1982 American film directed by David Beaird and starring Susan Curtis.

== Plot ==
A young blind woman is neglected by her overbearing father, who blames her for her mother's death. One day an escaped criminal breaks into her father's home and turns the sheltered blind woman's world upside down.
