= Matthew Causey =

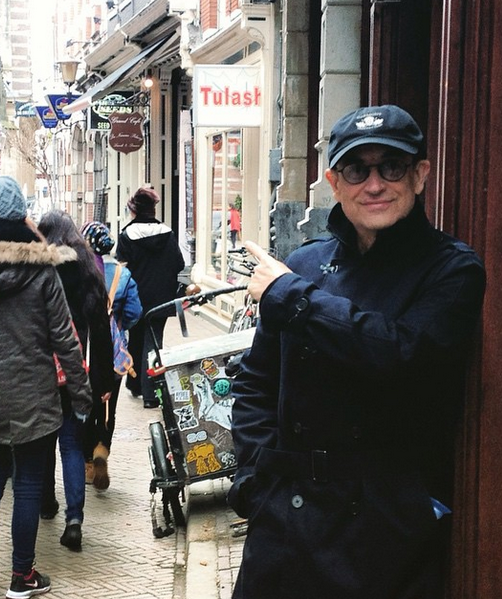
- Causey in Amsterdam, 2015
- Born: 1953 (age 72–73)
- Occupations: Academic, writer; Film actor, filmmaker, Singer-songwriter; Theatre/performance maker

Matthew Causey (born 1953) is an American academic, film and theatre maker, singer-songwriter and actor. He is associate professor at Trinity College, Dublin and director of the Arts Technology Research Laboratory in the School of Drama, Film and Music. He received his PhD in Drama from Stanford University, where he wrote, produced, and performed in his trilogy of plays, The History of the Avant-Garde (Kill the Dog, 1991; The Laboratory of Hallucinations, 1992; Death, 1993).

He made his film debut as Pondo Sinatra in the 1984 cult comedy The Party Animal.

In 2010, he was elected as a fellow of Trinity College Dublin.

== Publications ==
- Causey, M. Theatre and Performance in Digital Culture: from simulation to embeddedness (Routledge, 2006) ISBN 9781134205691
- Causey, M., Meehan, Emma, O'Dwyer, Neill, The Performing Subject in the Space of Technology: through the virtual toward the real (Palgrave, 2005) ISBN 9781137438171
