= Anthony Geary =

American actor (1947–2025)

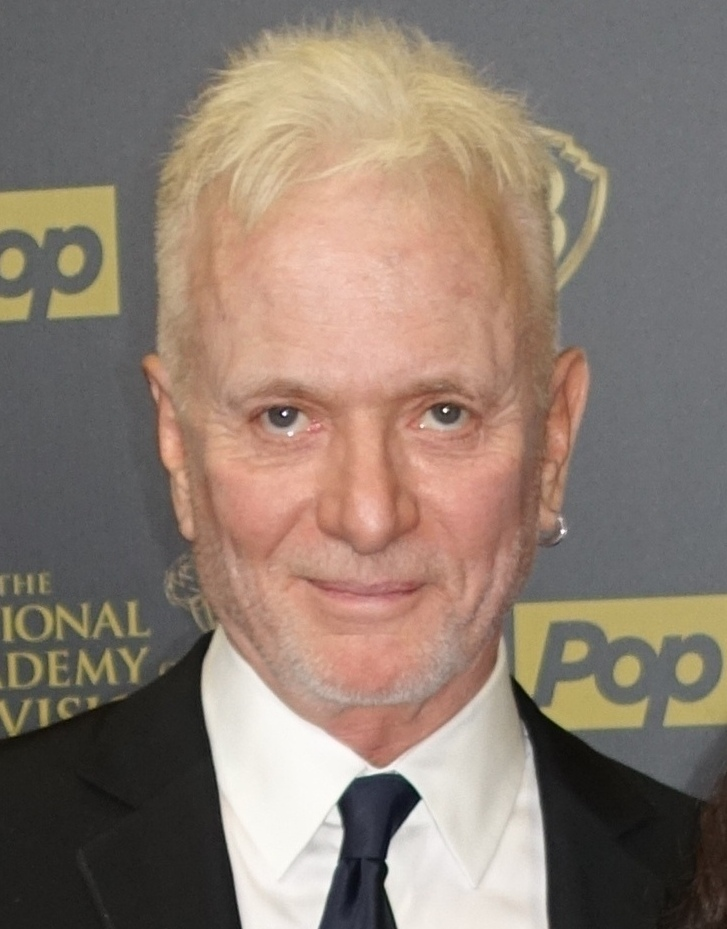
- Geary in 2015
- Born: Tony Dean Geary; May 29, 1947; Coalville, Utah, U.S.
- Died: December 14, 2025 (aged 78); Amsterdam, Netherlands
- Education: University of Utah
- Occupation: Actor
- Years active: 1970–2017
- Spouse: Claudio Gama (m. 2019)
- Relatives: Brendan Steele (nephew)

Anthony Geary (born Tony Dean Geary; May 29, 1947 – December 14, 2025) was an American actor. His career spanned more than four decades, and began in episodic television. He appeared as a guest on several primetime series and transitioned into a career predominantly in the soap opera genre. His first soap role was David Lockhart (1971–1972) on Bright Promise (1969–1972), and he later joined The Young and the Restless as George Curtis. His breakout role came in 1978 when he joined the cast of General Hospital as Luke Spencer. For his work as Luke, Geary went on to earn a record eight Daytime Emmy Awards for Outstanding Lead Actor in a Drama Series prior to his retirement.

In addition to his role as Luke, Geary had a prominent supporting role in the "Weird Al" Yankovic comedy UHF (1989); other notable films include Johnny Got His Gun (1971), Disorderlies (1987), Scorchers (1991), Teacher's Pet (2004) and Fish Tank (2009).

== Early life ==
Tony Dean Geary was born on May 29, 1947, in Coalville, Utah, to Dana (née Anderson) and Russell Dean Geary. He was one of four children. Dana was a homemaker and bookkeeper; Russell was a contractor who owned his own construction business. Geary was raised in the Mormon faith by his parents, who were both members of the Church of Jesus Christ of Latter-day Saints. In 1984, he remarked to The San Diego Union-Tribune that although he credited his faith-based upbringing with giving him a "solid family base," he also expressed feeling a sense of repression stemming from its philosophies and prejudices.

One of the 53 students who graduated from North Summit High School in Coalville, Geary went on to attend the University of Utah on a full theatre scholarship. In 1967, he relocated to Los Angeles, after being discovered by Jack Albertson, and joining a touring company of The Subject Was Roses.

== Career ==
Geary made his first appearance on television in an episode of Room 222 and later appeared on All in the Family as Roger, a "quirky" and "effeminate" character who is presumed to be gay by the series' lead character, Archie Bunker, due to the way in which he dresses and presents himself during the series' fifth episode, "Judging Books by Covers". He also appeared on The Mod Squad; Mannix; Marcus Welby, M.D.; The Streets of San Francisco; The Partridge Family; and Barnaby Jones.

Geary's first daytime role was on the NBC soap opera Bright Promise from 1971 to 1972. He later joined the cast of The Young and the Restless as rapist George Curtis; after six-months in the role, Geary was asked to re-sign with the soap, with plans to "rehabilitate" the role. He declined the offer, opting to shift focus towards motion pictures.

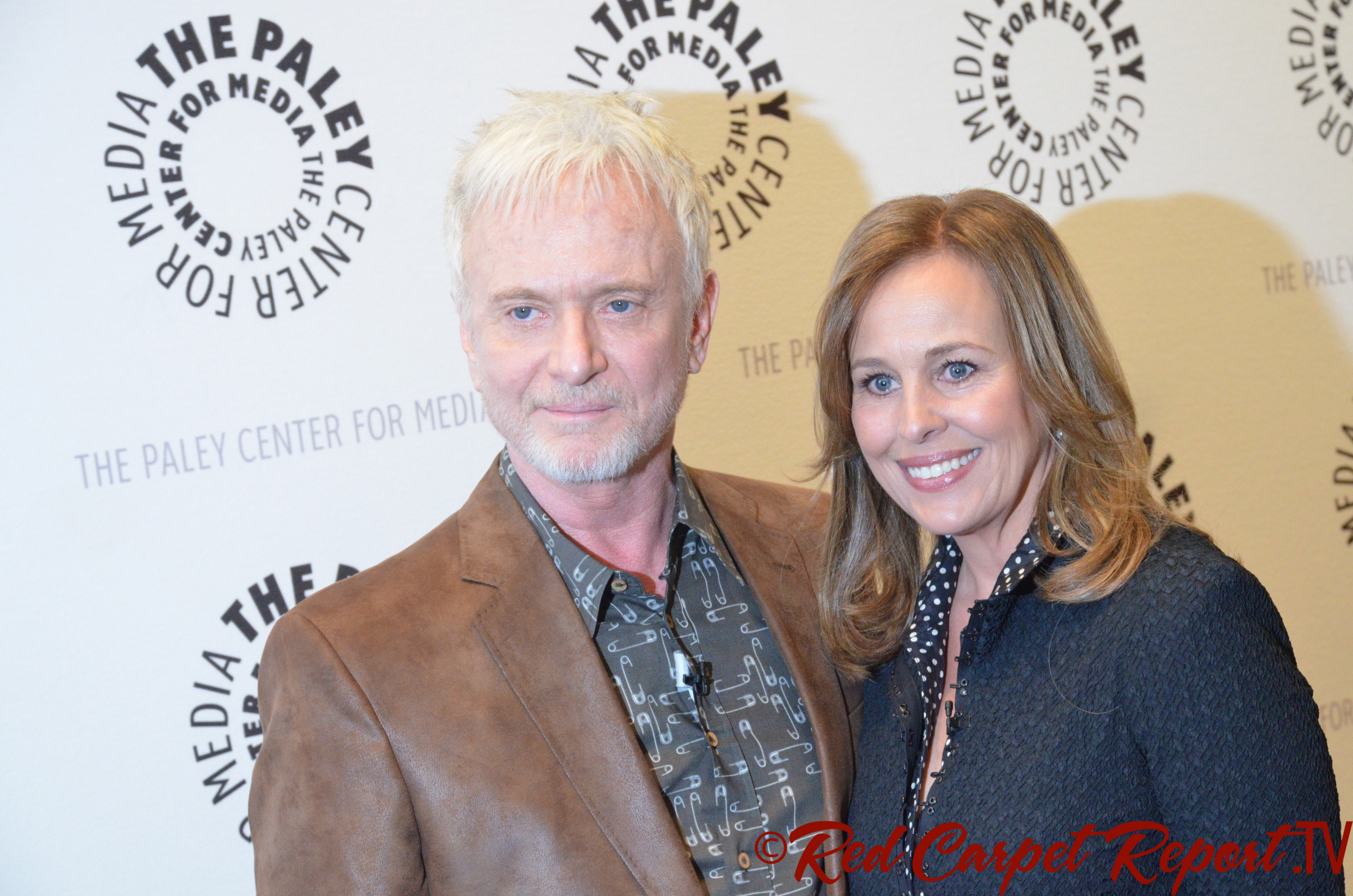
Geary (left) and Genie Francis' (right) popularity with fans led to Luke and Laura's 1981 wedding becoming the highest-rated soap opera episode of all time.

In 1978, Geary was hired for a 13-week story arc to play Luke Spencer on the ABC soap opera General Hospital. Luke Spencer began as a hit man and rapist who fell in love with - and subsequently married - his victim, Laura Webber (played by Genie Francis). His portrayal of Luke Spencer on General Hospital became a regular role, and the pairing of Luke and Laura became a sensation. The 1981 wedding of Luke and Laura holds the record as the highest-rated soap opera episode of all time.

Geary holds the distinction of winning a record eight Daytime Emmy Awards for Outstanding Lead Actor in a Drama Series. He was first nominated in 1980, and had his first win in 1982. Geary was nominated again in 1983, the same year he exited the role. He briefly returned in 1984.

Over the next several years, Geary took roles in various theater and television productions, as well as in several films, but did not reach his desired level of success in those endeavors. Despite the popularity of his work as Luke Spencer, filmmakers pigeonholed Geary based solely on the fact that he was a "soap actor". Oliver Stone initially cast him in Salvador but rescinded the offer after learning about him being a soap actor. In a conscious effort to distance himself from General Hospital, he actively sought a role in "Weird Al" Yankovic's film debut UHF (1989), that of the quietly eccentric scientist Philo (named for television pioneer Philo Farnsworth). Geary, a fan of Yankovic, went so far as to grow his hair out like Albert Einstein's and stay in character as Philo when meeting the film's casting team; he immediately landed the role.

In 1991, Geary returned to General Hospital as Luke's cousin and look-alike Bill Eckert; Geary expressed a desire to play a different character than Luke. However, due to poor feedback from the viewing public, Bill Eckert was killed off, and Geary resumed the role of Luke in 1993, when Genie Francis returned to General Hospital.

He was nominated in 1997 and 1998 for Daytime Emmys for Outstanding Lead Actor, and had his second win in 1999, and his third in 2000. He received another nomination in 2003, and had his fourth win in 2004. When Geary won for the fifth time in 2006, he set the record for the most lead actor wins. Geary received another Emmy nomination in 2007, and in 2008, he again set a record for most lead actor wins with his sixth Emmy for Outstanding Lead Actor.

Geary set a record in 2012 with his seventh Daytime Emmy win and again in 2015 for his eighth win for Outstanding Leading Actor in a Drama Series after 16 nominations for the same role of General Hospital's Luke Spencer. Geary publicly announced on Friday, May 8, 2015, that he would be leaving his role on General Hospital. Geary finished taping his last scenes on the General Hospital set on June 23, 2015. His last air date was July 27, 2015. He later made a cameo appearance on a May 2017 episode to facilitate the retirement of co-star Jane Elliot, who played Luke's former on-screen wife Tracy Quartermaine. Days prior to Geary's death, he filmed a scene with former General Hospital co-star Anders Hove, which served as his final acting credit.

The comedy movie UHF was an exception to Geary's dramatic roles. He also appeared in 1987's Disorderlies, with hip-hop trio the Fat Boys, and appeared in more than 50 stage plays, including the award-winning one-man show titled Human Scratchings in 1996.

== Personal life ==
Geary was the uncle of Brendan Steele, an American professional golfer. In 2010, during an appearance on The Wendy Williams Show, Geary disclosed he had a brief relationship with Elizabeth Taylor in the early 1980s. He met Claudio Gama in February 1995, and they married in February 2019. Following Geary's retirement in 2015, the couple moved to the Netherlands, where Geary had owned a home in Amsterdam "for years".

=== Death and tributes ===
Geary died in Amsterdam, Netherlands, on December 14, 2025, at the age of 78. His death was attributed to complications that arose following a surgical procedure three days earlier.

Numerous figures from the entertainment industry, some of whom were former co-stars or collaborators, paid tribute to Geary, including Maurice Benard, Sarah Joy Brown, Genie Francis, Kimberly McCullough, Emma Samms, Rick Springfield, and John Stamos; additionally, General Hospital executive producer Frank Valentini and the National Academy of Television Arts and Sciences issued statements in regards to his death. In a series of posts on Twitter, Francis described herself as spoiled, thanks to Geary, in regards to "leading men for the rest of my life".

ABC announced they would re-air the July 17, 2015, episode of General Hospital in tribute to Geary on New Year's Day. At the conclusion of the serial's January 6, 2026, episode, a title card dedicated in his memory was displayed; a montage is to air at a later date. A compilation of commemorative moments from Geary's work as Luke aired on January 23, 2026, with anecdotes from cast members, including Nancy Lee Grahn, Francis, and Laura Wright. A full commemorative episode dedicated to Geary's role (Luke Spencer) aired on February 20.

== Filmography ==
Acting roles
Year	Title	Role	Notes	Ref.
1970	Room 222	Tom Whalom	Episode: "Choose One & They Lived Happily/Unhappily Ever After"	
1971	All in the Family	Roger	Episode: "Judging Books by Covers"	
1971	Johnny Got His Gun	Redhead		
1971–1972	Bright Promise	David Lockhart	Soap opera	
1972	Blood Sabbath	David		
1972	The Mod Squad	Johnson	Episode: "Good Times Are Just Memories"	
1972	The Partridge Family	Greg Houser	Episode: "Ain't Loveth Grand?"	
1973	Mannix	Eddie Decken	Episode: "A Way to Dusty Death"	
1973	Shaft	David Oliver	Episode: "Hit and Run"	
1973	The Young and the Restless	George Curtis	Soap opera	
1974	Doc Elliot	Dennis Graham	Episode: "The Carrier"	
1974	Sorority Kill	Tony		
1971–1975	Marcus Welby, M.D.	John Gavanelli	2 episodes	
1974–1976	The Streets of San Francisco	Gary Jelinek / Cajun / Joe Markham	4 episodes	
1975	The Wide World of Mystery	Dennis	Episode: "Distant Early Warning"	
1976–1977	Barnaby Jones	Deputy Blake Jeffries / Nelson Mosley / Wilson	3 episodes	
1977	Most Wanted	Chops	Episode: "The Driver"	
1978	The Return of Captain Nemo	Bork		
1978	Project U.F.O. TV Series	Darryl Biggs	Episode: "Sighting 4010: The Waterford Incident"	
1978	Starsky & Hutch	Delano	Episode: "The Trap"	
1978	The Six Million Dollar Man	Arta	Episode: "The Lost Island"	
1978	General Hospital	Luke Spencer	Series regular: 1978–1984, 1993–2015; Guest: 2017	
1983	Shaft of Love	Doug Hathaway		
1983	Intimate Agony	Dr. Kyle Richards		
1984	Antony and Cleopatra	Octavius Caesar		
1984	Sins of the Past	Lt. Malovich		
1984	The Impostor	Cade		
1985	Kicks	Martin Cheevers		
1985	Hotel	Eli Gilmour / Phil Tanner	2 episodes	
1986	You Are The Jury	Sam Billings	Episode: "The State of Ohio vs. James Wolsky"	
1987	P.I. Private Investigations	Larry		
1987	Disorderlies	Winslow Lowry		
1987	Penitentiary III	Serenghetti		
1987	Perry Mason: The Case of the Murdered Madam	Steve Reynolds		
1988	You Can't Hurry Love	Tony		
1988	Pass the Ammo	Stonewall		
1988	It Takes Two	Wheel/Giuseppe's voice		
1988	Dangerous Love	Mickey		
1989	UHF	Philo		
1989	Night Life	John Devlin		
1989	Do You Know the Muffin Man?	Stephen Pugliotti		
1989	High Desert Kill	Dr. Jim Cole		
1989	Crack House	Dockett		
1989–1990	Murder, She Wrote	Eric Grant / KGB Lt. Fyodor Alexandrov	2 episodes	
1990	Sunset Beat	Uncredited Role	Made For TV Movie	
1990	Sunset Beat	Uncredited Role	Episode: "One Down, Four Up" (TV Series)	
1991–1993	General Hospital	Bill Eckert	Series regular: 1991–1993	
1991	Night of the Warrior	Lynch		
1991	Scorchers	Preacher		
1993	Whistlestop Girl	Andy		
1994	Roseanne	Luke Spencer	Episode: "Suck Up or Shut Up"	
1995	Burke's Law	Clayton Cole	Episode: "Who Killed the Centerfold?"	
1998	Port Charles	Luke Spencer		
2004	Teacher's Pet	John / Juan	Voice	
2005	Carpool Guy	Carpool Guy		
2008	General Hospital: Night Shift	Luke Spencer	Episode: "Past and Presence – Part One"	
2009	Fish Tank	Van Man		
2013	Alice and the Monster	George		

== Awards and nominations ==
List of acting awards and nominations
Year	Award	Category	Title	Result	Ref.
1980	Soapy Award	Best Actor	General Hospital	Won	
1981	Daytime Emmy Award	Outstanding Lead Actor in a Drama Series	General Hospital	Nominated	
1981	Soapy Award	Best Actor	General Hospital	Won	
1982	Daytime Emmy Award	Outstanding Lead Actor in a Drama Series	General Hospital	Won	
1982	Soapy Awards	Best Actor	General Hospital	Won	
1983	Daytime Emmy Award	Outstanding Lead Actor in a Drama Series	General Hospital	Nominated	
1993	Soap Opera Digest Award	Outstanding Lead Actor	General Hospital	Nominated	
1994	Soap Opera Digest Award	Outstanding Lead Actor	General Hospital	Nominated	
1997	Daytime Emmy Award	Outstanding Lead Actor in a Drama Series	General Hospital	Nominated	
1998	Daytime Emmy Award	Outstanding Lead Actor in a Drama Series	General Hospital	Nominated	
1999	Daytime Emmy Award	Outstanding Lead Actor in a Drama Series	General Hospital	Won	
1999	Soap Opera Digest Award	Outstanding Lead Actor	General Hospital	Won	
2000	Daytime Emmy Award	Outstanding Lead Actor in a Drama Series	General Hospital	Won	
2000	Soap Opera Digest Award	Outstanding Lead Actor	General Hospital	Won	
2003	Daytime Emmy Award	Outstanding Lead Actor in a Drama Series	General Hospital	Nominated	
2004	Daytime Emmy Award	Outstanding Lead Actor in a Drama Series	General Hospital	Won	
2006	Daytime Emmy Award	Outstanding Lead Actor in a Drama Series	General Hospital	Won	
2006	TV Land Award	Most Wonderful Wedding (shared with Genie Francis)	General Hospital	Nominated	
2007	Daytime Emmy Award	Outstanding Lead Actor in a Drama Series	General Hospital	Nominated	
2008	Daytime Emmy Award	Outstanding Lead Actor in a Drama Series	General Hospital	Won	
2009	Daytime Emmy Award	Outstanding Lead Actor in a Drama Series	General Hospital	Nominated	
2012	Daytime Emmy Award	Outstanding Lead Actor in a Drama Series	General Hospital	Won	
2015	Daytime Emmy Award	Outstanding Lead Actor in a Drama Series	General Hospital	Won	
2016	Daytime Emmy Award	Outstanding Lead Actor in a Drama Series	General Hospital	Nominated	
