= The Civilization of Maxwell Bright =

2005 film by David Beaird

- Directed by: David Beaird
- Produced by: Steven J. Wolfe; Michael Roth; Shevonne Durkin; Paul Etheredge
- Starring: Patrick Warburton; Marie Matiko; Eric Roberts; Leland Crooke; Jennifer Tilly
- Cinematography: Dean Lent
- Edited by: April Larson
- Music by: Daniel Pinder
- Release date: 2005
- Country: United States
- Language: English

The Civilization of Maxwell Bright is a 2005 romance film, directed by David Beaird and starring Patrick Warburton, Marie Matiko, Eric Roberts, Leland Crooke, and Jennifer Tilly. The film's plot centers on a man who obtains a mail-order bride, with unexpected results. It has seen success on the arthouse movie circuit, winning awards at the WorldFest Houston, New York VisionFest, Florida Film Festival, Boulder International Film Festival, and Beverly Hills Film Festival.

== Synopsis ==
After a series of bad relationships, the last one ending with his lover injuring him with a hoe while they argue on the street, fully nude, in view of the cops and his neighbors, Maxwell Bright resolves to find his fantasy woman: obedient and submissive. His dissolute friends goad him into ordering a mail-order bride from China.

Mai Ling, the Chinese bride, arrives after six weeks. She is perfect, and even makes Max's chaotic house into a welcoming home. However, he reacts by treating her like a prostitute, and humiliates her in front of his friends. At this point, Mai Ling reveals that she is really a Buddhist nun who took her sister's place. Max has an epiphany, recognizing Mai Ling as a deeply spiritual and moral woman.

The couple falls in love, and their relationship grows amid mutual respect. Mai Ling attempts to awaken Max's buddha-nature, and Max introduces Mai Ling to the luxuries of modern American living.

This comes to an abrupt end when Max, his finances failing after spending $100,000 on Mai Ling, discovers that he also has terminal cancer. Mai Ling supports him and helps him prepare for death, and he comes at last to explore his spiritual side and make his peace with those he has harmed.

When Max dies, Mai Ling resumes her life as a nun.

== Cast ==
- Patrick Warburton as Maxwell Bright
- Marie Lan Matiko as Mai Ling
- Eric Roberts as Arliss
- Leland Crooke as Buddy DeHare
- Jennifer Tilly as Dr. O’Shannon
- Simon Callow as Mr. Wroth
- Kurt Fuller as Berdette
- Terence Knox as Officer Riggs
- Nora Dunn as Mary Jane
- Carol Kane as Temple
- John Glover as Ogden
- Missi Pyle as Cop
