= Pass the Ammo =

1988 film by David Beaird

- Theatrical release poster by Tom Jung
- Directed by: David Beaird
- Written by: Joel Cohen; Neil Cohen
- Produced by: Mort Engelberg
- Starring: Bill Paxton; Linda Kozlowski; Annie Potts; Tim Curry
- Cinematography: Mark Irwin
- Edited by: Bill Yahraus
- Music by: Carter Burwell
- Production company: The Vista Organisation
- Distributed by: New Century Vista Film Company
- Release dates: October 29, 1987 (MIFEDMercato internazionale del film e del documentario); March 4, 1988 (United States)
- Running time: 93 minutes
- Country: United States
- Language: English
- Box office: $169,785

Pass the Ammo is a 1987 American comedy film starring Bill Paxton, Annie Potts, Linda Kozlowski and Tim Curry. The film is a spoof of televangelism released right after the real-life scandals related to Jim Bakker and Jimmy Swaggart. The movie's working title during production was ...And Pass the Ammunition, a reference to the phrase "praise the Lord and pass the ammunition."

== Plot ==
Reverend Ray Porter runs a Pentecostal faith healing and televangelism empire based in Arkansas. Four locals, one of whom was bilked out of her inheritance by Rev. Porter's ministry and another of whom just got out of prison, try to rob Porter's ministry. A series of wrong turns inside the church during the robbery leads Claire, her boyfriend Jesse, Arnold and Big Joe onstage right in the middle of a broadcast, and the four robbers turn what was supposed to have been just a robbery into a hostage situation.

During the hostage negotiations, a series of snowballing scandals involving the ministry come to light. The robbery, hostage taking, and scandal revelations all are broadcast live over satellite television as locals gather in bars to watch. Porter and the robbers develop a rapport that resembles shop talk among thieves as they discuss the best ways of investing stolen money.

The Christian network's producer, a drug-addled electronics wizard named Stonewall, adds minor complications to the ongoings, playing with the images in comical ways that keep the television audience laughing.

The local sheriff, whose duck-hunting trip was interrupted by the incident, seems to sympathize with the would-be robbers. He has to deal with his own moral struggle in trying to enforce the law when his sympathies lie elsewhere. He just wants to see the situation end with nobody getting hurt, and he butts heads with the network's owner and federal agents who demand harsher action.

The owner of the satellite network, G. W. Wraith (loosely based on Jerry Falwell), demands that the National Guard be called in, leading to a siege and an unexpected outcome to the entire situation.

== Cast ==
- Bill Paxton as Jesse Wilkes
- Linda Kozlowski as Claire
- Tim Curry as Reverend Ray Porter
- Annie Potts as Darla Porter
- Dennis Burkley as Joe "Big Joe" Becker
- Glenn Withrow as Arnold Limpet
- Leland Crooke as Sheriff Rascal Lebeaux
- Anthony Geary as Stonewall
- Richard Paul as G.W. Wraith
- Paul Ben-Victor as Eddie DePaul
- Megan Blake as Cherry
- Brian Thompson as Kenny Hamilton

== Availability ==
The film was released on VHS by International Video Entertainment sometime after its theatrical run and later in 1991 by Avid Home Entertainment in the SLP Mode. The film was also released on Laserdisc by Image Entertainment.
