= The Wigs =

- Origin: Milwaukee, Wisconsin
- Genres: Power pop
- Members: Jim Cushinery; Bobby Tews; Marty Ross

The Wigs are an American power pop band.

== Background ==
The Wigs were formed in Milwaukee, Wisconsin by vocalist and guitarist Jim Cushinery with Bobby Tews on drums and Marty Ross on vocals and guitar. Bass guitarist Bob Pachner left the band shortly before the group's album was recorded.

After regrouping on the West Coast in 1983, Val McCallum joined the group on bass guitar. The Wigs were later signed to CBS records. In 1986, Ross landed a part in the TV series the New Monkees. With his departure, The Wigs became the band 57 Braves and the group eventually disbanded.

== Album ==
The Wigs album File Under: Pop Vocal was a regional hit in the Midwest in 1981. The group's songs are mainly written by Cushinery and Ross. The album was released by the Streetwise label.

== Film ==
The Wigs are prominently featured in the 1986 romantic comedy My Chauffeur and the band is featured on the film's soundtrack. The band wrote eight of the songs for the film. People Magazine cited that the film's soundtrack "has some nice rock 'n' roll by an L.A. -based group called The Wigs."

== Reunions ==
In 2009, the band reunited for the release of File Under: Pop Vocal on CD. In June 2013, the band reunited for the reissue of the My Chauffeur soundtrack. In June 2014, The Wigs made a special appearance at the Milwaukee Summerfest. The concert included all of the original band members Jim Cushinery, Marty Ross, Bobby Tews and Robert Pachner.

== Discography ==
File Under: Pop Vocal CD track listing

1. "I Can See It Now"
2. "180 Degrees"
3. "Susie's Got a Problem"
4. "Tell It All"
5. "First Time"
6. "Tijuana"
7. "Popular Girl"
8. "Mony, Mony"
9. "What I Got"
10. "It's Over"
11. "Blood"
12. "Stupid People"
13. "You Say Ono"
14. "Hard Candy"
