= Marty Ross (musician) =

American singer-songwriter

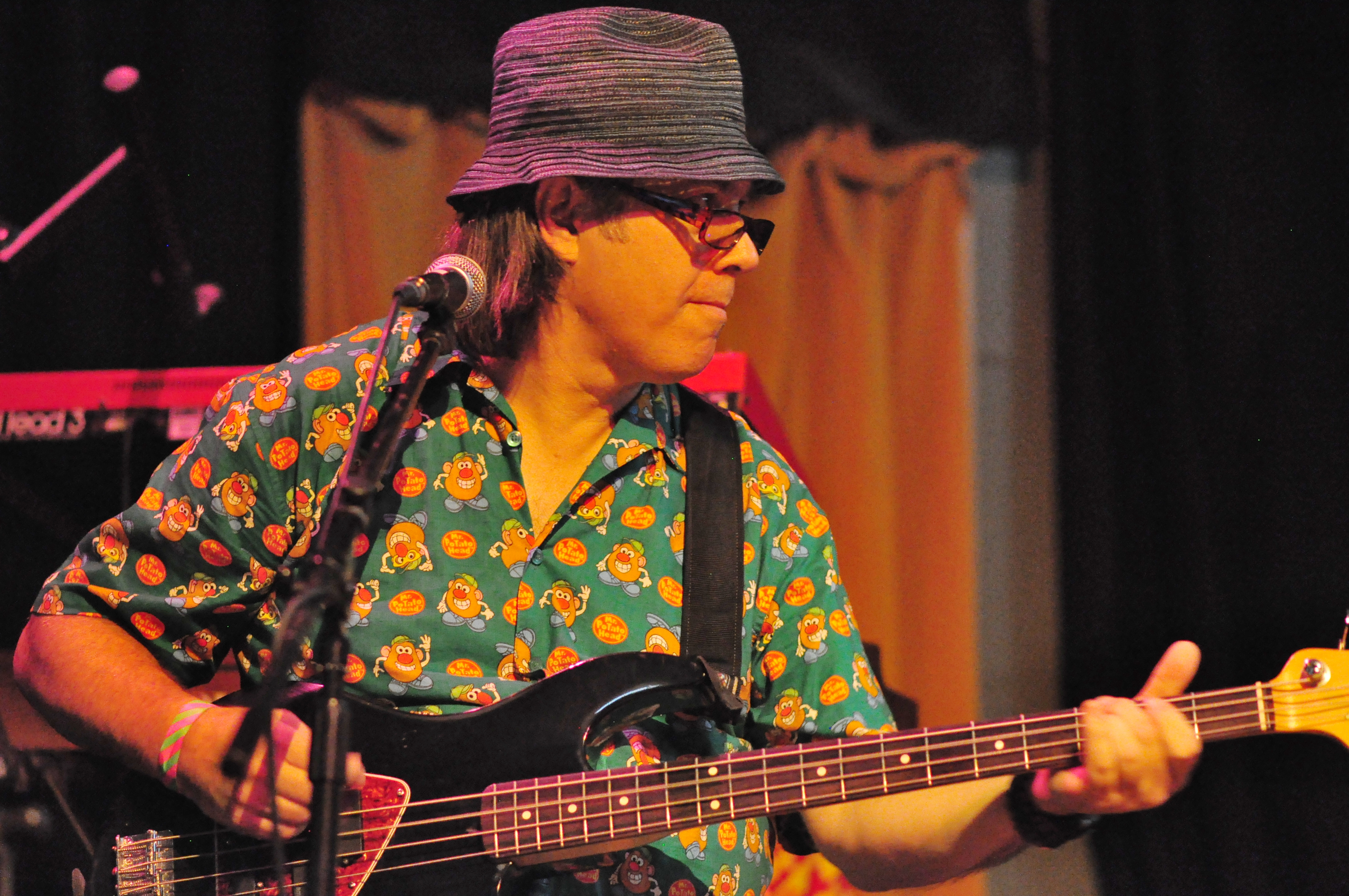
Ross playing in 2016 with Prairie's Hermits, Mirkwood and Shire Cafe, Arlington, Washington.

Marty Ross is an American singer, songwriter and guitarist who is best known for his role in the TV series New Monkees, as a member of the power pop band The Wigs and as a singer in 2018 through 2025 with the legendary west coast session players The Wrecking Crew.

== Biography ==
Ross was born in Eugene, Oregon. His mother Margaret, born in England, was a folk singer, his father Gordon was a professor of history at Rockford College, now known as Rockford University. Ross became proficient at the tenor banjo by his 5th birthday and learned to play the guitar at 6 years old. He was influenced by his mother's folk harmonies and his Uncle Bob Fisher's (his mom's brother) sense of rock and roll. Fisher quit the band he was in to move from England to live with the Ross family in the late 1960s in Rockford, Illinois. The band he quit would go on to become the popular rock band Mott The Hoople.

Ross was schooled in Rockford and during his father's sabbatical Ross went to high school in London, United Kingdom, Barcelona, Spain then returned to finish schooling in Rockford. It was in Spain that Ross learned flamenco guitar which eventually became part of his style of play. Following high school graduation, he enrolled at Bradley University in Peoria, Illinois majoring in music but before the end of his freshman year moved to Milwaukee, Wisconsin to begin his music career.

In Milwaukee he joined the power pop band The Wigs. The band’s album File Under Pop Vocal was a regional hit. He later auditioned for and was offered a part in the pop rock music group New Monkees and in the television series of the same name.

== Movies ==
As a member of The Wigs, Ross appeared in the motion picture My Chauffeur and sang on camera the song "Fire!" which he wrote. Jim Cushinery of The Wigs wrote seven songs for the film making the band's contribution to the film a total of eight songs. The soundtrack to My Chauffeur was released in June 2013. Ross also performed a song for the film Murphy's Law, produced three songs and performed a cover of the Deep Purple classic "Hush" for the movie "Stateside" and the opening theme for Kounterfeit. Ross wrote and produced songs for the feature films "Mod Squad","The Runner" and many others. He can also be heard singing in the Showtime movie "Noriega: Gods Favorite ". Ross teamed with Randy Gerston to produce for the movie Blair Witch Project the single mix of " The Order Of Death" by Public Image Limited. Ross co-wrote a song with composer Billy Sullivan for the documentary film Platoon: Brothers in Arms. In 2019 Ross co-wrote a song with composer Billy Sullivan for the film The Truth About Marriage.

== Television ==
Ross appeared in the 1987 syndicated musical situation comedy television series New Monkees produced by Columbia Pictures Television.

The producers selected him for one of the four leading roles after auditioning over 5,000 people. The series was produced by Bob Rafelson, Burt Scheneider and Steve Blauner of the original TV show The Monkees. After the show was cancelled Ross rejoined Jim Cushinery and Bobby Tews from The Wigs to form the band 57 Braves. He eventually shifted his career from a live performer to one of a music composer for film and TV. He provided songs for over 300 episodes of television including, but not limited to traditional music from different and varied musical cultures throughout the world. These instrumentals proved to be useful in many shows including Nash Bridges, Soldier Of Fortune, Lifestyles of the Rich and Famous, The Ricki Lake Show, CBS Sports, Fame Fortune and Romance, Home Videos of The Stars and numerous TV movies.

== Performances ==
=== 2016 ===
Ross played his first solo show in many years, opening for former Babys frontman John Waite at the Rose Theater in Pasadena, CA, in July 2016. He also performed bass with Prairies Hermits in a limited run tour featuring famed artist and drummer Prairie Prince in September 2016.

=== 2017 ===
On Saturday, February 25, 2017, Ross performed a concert opening for legendary singer/songwriter Don McLean at the Saban Theater in Beverly Hills, CA. He was joined onstage by Jim Cushinery from The Wigs and Guy Hoffman from The Violent Femmes. It was the first time that Cushinery and Ross had performed together in Los Angeles since 1989.

On November 11, 2017, the New Monkees had a thirty-year reunion where all original members attended and performed a short concert.

Ross performed again at the Saban Theater November 21, 2017, appearing on the bill with Micky Dolenz and Felix Cavaliere. Dino Kovas of New Monkees performed with Ross for the first time in 10 years.

=== 2018 ===
On August 2, 2018, Ross performed in concert with the legendary Wrecking Crew in "The Wrecking Crew Farewell To Glen Campbell." Ross played guitar and sang three of Campbell’s most loved songs: "Galveston," "Rhinestone Cowboy," and "Wichita Lineman."

On August 18, 2018, Ross sang with Micky Dolenz of The Monkees, marking the first time that a member of the original Monkees and the New Monkees performed on stage together. The event was held for charity. Ross performed with Micky Dolenz at the Winnetka Bowl in August 2018, singing an emotional rendition of "Without You" recorded by their mutual friend Harry Nilsson. Ross also performed with Micky Dolenz in Upland California Twist and Shout. Another former New Monkee, Dino Kovas, sang on stage as well.

On October 13, 2018, Ross was asked to perform songs for the Smithereens Pat DiNizio Memorial Birthday Tribute at T. Boyles Nightclub in Pasadena Ca., which featured Severo Jornacion and Jim Babjak from The Smithereens.

In November 2018, Ross announced a planned 2019 reunion with the New Monkees.

=== 2019 ===
On January 27, 2019, Ross appeared again in two sold-out shows with “The Wrecking Crew Tribute To Glen Campbell," with Ross singing many of Campbell’s hits.

On February 16, 2019, Ross reunited with Dino Kovas, Larry Saltis, and Jared Chandler of the New Monkees. The sold-out event was created and promoted by 521 Promotions Director Jodi Ritzen. Original Monkee Micky Dolenz joined the New Monkees onstage to sing some of his hits. This marked the first time that an original Monkee had performed with the New Monkees in public.

Ross reunited with The Wigs at a sold-out show performed at Shank Hall in Milwaukee, WI, on September 14, 2019.

Ross performed onstage with Micky Dolenz and his band on September 22, 2019, singing the classic Monkees songs "Daydream Believer," "I'm a Believer", "Pleasant Valley Sunday," plus others. Ross was the solo singer on the Larry Willams classic song "Slow Down," made famous by The Beatles.

=== 2020 ===
Marty Ross announced his first solo album would be completed in late 2020. The album is now scheduled to be released in 2023.

=== 2021 ===
Ross became a Disc Jockey with Monkee Mania Radio, an internet based radio station that plays music and programming related to The Monkees.

=== 2023 ===
On February 6 Ross performed with Don Randi and Friends at Oscars Nightclub in Palm Springs after the city Of Palm Springs dedicated a star posthumously to legendary session drummer Hal Blaine.Nancy Sinatra did a surprise performance of “These Boots Were Made For Walkin”. Ross appeared in a solo show in Milwaukee Wisconsin at Shank Hall on April 21. Ross performed his songs from various stages of his career as well as songs that influenced him.
