= New Monkees =

American television series

- Title card
- Genre: Sitcom; Musical
- Based on: The Monkees
- Developed by: Matthew Fassberg; Victor Fresco
- Written by: Rob Fresco; R.B. Armstrong; Jeremy Bate
- Starring: Jared Chandler; Dino Kovas; Marty Ross; Larry Saltis; Gordon Oas-Heim; Lynnie Godfrey; Bess Motta
- Theme music composer: Joe Curiale; Jimmy Haddox
- Opening theme: "Turn It Up"
- Composers: Peter Kaye; Mark Leggett; Edie Robinette-Petrachi
- Country of origin: United States
- Original language: English
- No. of seasons: 1
- No. of episodes: 13

Production
- Executive producer: Steve Blauner
- Producers: Matthew Fassberg; Victor Fresco
- Cinematography: Robert Knouse
- Editors: Robert DeMaio; David Helfand
- Running time: 22 minutes
- Production companies: Coca-Cola Telecommunications; Straybert Productions

Original release
- Network: Syndication
- Release: September 14 – December 7, 1987

Related
- The Monkees

New Monkees is the name of both an American pop rock music group and a 1987 syndicated television show featuring the group.

== Overview ==
=== Background ===
The 20th anniversary of The Monkees TV series in 1986 generated enough interest that New Monkees, a full reboot of the earlier series with none of the original members of The Monkees involved, was conceived later that year and launched the following year. The show was distributed by LBS Communications in association with Coca-Cola Telecommunications (the successor to original Monkees distributors Screen Gems). Straybert Productions, headed by Steve Blauner (a former partner of original Monkees producers Robert Rafelson and Bert Schneider), served as the project's producers. Blauner had originally hoped to only use New Monkees as a working title.

Steve Blauner’s daughter had originally conceived the series: given that there had been a wave of revivals of existing intellectual properties in the mid-1980s, she asked her father why The Monkees had not received the same. The original proposal would have had the four characters be the sons of the original four characters from the 1960s series.

The group's members were Jared Chandler (guitar and vocals), Dino Kovas (drums and vocals), Marty Ross (bass and vocals), and Larry Saltis (lead guitar and vocals). As it had been with the original Monkees, each had to pass a grueling set of auditions; several prominent musicians' children, including the sons of Bobby Darin (whom Blauner had managed in Darin's lifetime), original Monkee Michael Nesmith, Donovan, and Frankie Avalon, were among those who tried out for the series, as did Michael "Boogaloo Shrimp" Chambers, who advanced to be one of nine semifinalists. The producers instead chose a group largely consisting of unknown talent; Marty Ross was, at the time, a member of The Wigs, a group that was achieving minor success on the Los Angeles performance circuit, but at 27, he was the oldest and most experienced musician of the group and was recommended to the position by his agent. The others, ranging from 18 to 20, were largely unknown and were recruited through advertisements on MTV, with some working minimum wage jobs at the time; Dino Kovas was working as a video jockey and playing in a band called Snakeout, while Larry Saltis was working for Atlantic Records. Jared Chandler, a waiter with no formal experience, rounded out the cast. Ross recalled being the last person cast, having narrowly edged out an unnamed member of what would become the Blue Man Group for the fourth and final slot.

The original Monkees, then recently reunited, expressed displeasure at having their band's name recycled for a new iteration. Their manager, David Fishof, expressed a grudging willingness to have the two bands tour together, but only if the new Monkees were the opening act. Original Monkees frontman Micky Dolenz bluntly refused the producers' offer to direct the pilot, telling them that he was unwilling to give up the Monkees identity to anyone else. A lawsuit by the original band contributed to the series' cancellation after 13 out of a planned 22 episodes were released.

=== Premise ===
The series had little in common thematically with its predecessor and more in common with the then-popular Pee-Wee's Playhouse. Whereas the original series focused on a struggling band trying to break into the business, this series confined its musicians in a large, surreal, boombox-shaped mansion with a live-in butler and a diner with its own waitress. Rounding out the cast was Helen, a decommissioned military supercomputer that was portrayed as a pair of lips on a static background.

The band's musical sound drew comparisons to Walk the Moon, Glass Tiger and Richard Marx.

=== Revival ===
All four band members remained friends after the end of the series. On November 11, 2017, all four New Monkees attended a 30-year reunion organized by Amy Collen. They were interviewed for the podcast Deep Dish Radio with Tim Powers, and performed a few songs. On February 16, 2019, the New Monkees performed a concert (arranged by Jodi Ritzen) at the Pig 'n Whistle restaurant and bar in Los Angeles, with an appearance by the original Monkees' Micky Dolenz.

== Cast ==
- Larry Saltis as Larry
- Jared Chandler as Jared
- Dino Kovas as Dino
- Marty Ross as Marty
- Gordon Oas-Heim as Manford
- Lynnie Godfrey as Helen
- Bess Motta as Rita the Waitress

== Episodes ==
No.	Title	Directed by	Written by	Original release date
1	"Weather the Storm"	E. Von Kelso	Victor Fresco	September 14, 1987
A personal storm cloud follows Dino. It is raining, it is snowing, it is hailing — but only on him.
2	"All My Martys"	Bob Radler	R.B. Armstrong and J.S. Bate	September 21, 1987
When Marty falls asleep on a copy machine numerous duplicate Martys are set loose in the mansion. Wackiness ensues.
3	"Test Tube Tube"	E. Von Kelso	Rob Fresco	September 28, 1987
Dino, Marty and Larry, dressed in ridiculous fruit costumes, are rehearsing for a children's party. Meanwhile, Jared discovers a strange room with only a TV and remote control inside. He zaps himself and a girl from the TV world in and out of various TV programs as the other boys wonder why he has yet to show up for practice in his Amazon costume.
4	"Minister Bob"	Bob Radler	Rob Fresco	October 5, 1987
The boys meet two sumo wrestlers who also want to start a singing group. Meanwhile, Larry's Uncle Bob (a televangelist) causes trouble around the neighborhood.
5	"Ruff Day"	C. D. Taylor	R.B. Armstrong and J.S. Bate	October 12, 1987
It's a dog eat dog world and Jared knows all about it. While walking his dog, Jared has a mind exchange with his pet. Hijinks transpire.
6	"Don't Touch That Dial"	Ed Greenberg	Victor Fresco, Julianne Norman	October 19, 1987
Larry and Dino are catapulted into an evil parallel universe when Dino disobeys Jared's warning not to touch a certain red dial in the lab. Their plans to return home are complicated when Larry falls in love with the alternate universe version of their maid.
7	"Monkee Mail"	David Wild	Rob Fresco, Victor Fresco, Matthew Fassberg	October 26, 1987
The boys decide to answer some fan mail. The result? They meet some interesting fans.
8	"Larry Leaves"	Victor Fresco	Victor Fresco	November 2, 1987
Larry takes it upon himself to cast the role of his girlfriend on the show.
9	"King of Space and Time"	Victor Fresco	Rob Fresco, Louis E. Angelo	November 9, 1987
Jared steps through a forbidden doorway in the mansion and enters a "video world", where space and time are controlled by a TV-channel selector.
10	"Meet the Pope"	Bob Radler	Rob Fresco, Victor Fresco	November 16, 1987
Pope John Paul II is in town and the boys are caught up in the Pope-mania. They discover that the Pope has left his guitar at their diner, so they must run downtown to return it to him. Along the way, they begin to wonder if anyone really realizes the significance of the Pope's visit as they encounter shady characters who are exploiting the Pope's image to make a fast buck. Ray "Boom Boom" Mancini portrays a street huckster.
11	"Helen Goes Shopping"	George Bloom	Rob Fresco, Robert DeMaio	November 23, 1987
Helen, the boys' super computer, is addicted to shopping. Unfortunately she has no money of her own so she uses the boys' credit cards.
12	"The Game of Games Show"	Rocky Schenck	Matthew Fassberg	November 30, 1987
The boys are contestants on a game show. Unfortunately they get caught up in the excitement and wager all of their possessions.
13	"My Three Sons"	Rob Fresco	Rob Fresco	December 7, 1987
When the show gets a new soundtrack, the boys dream the whole show is changing. In this version Jared and Helen are the parents of three naughty boys. A clip show with voices dubbed by The Firesign Theatre.

== Release ==
The New Monkees was originally slated to be distributed by Colex Enterprises (a joint venture of LBS Communications and Columbia Pictures Television in association with Coca-Cola Telecommunications); however, the company dissolved before the series premiered. As a result, this show, among properties previously distributed by Colex, was ultimately "distributed by LBS Communications in association with Coca-Cola Telecommunications". The series was eventually rerun in Australia in 1990.

== Reception ==
New Monkees drew swift and harsh negative reception. Instead of fan mail, the band received hate mail and death threats.

== Album ==

New Monkees - Warner Bros. Records (released on August 31, 1987)

Track listing:
Side 1:

1. "What I Want" (Eddie Schwartz/David Tyson)
2. "Do It Again" (Julia Downes/John Parr)
3. "I Don't Know" (Michael Cruz)
4. "The Way She Moves" (Denis Keldie)
5. "Boy Inside the Man" (Tom Cochrane)

Side 2:

1. "Burnin' Desire" (Rob Elvis)
2. "Whatever It Takes" (Alan Roy Scott/Arnie Roman)
3. "Affection" (Ken Brown)
4. "Carlene" (Greg Barnhill/Gene Houston/Johnny Hozey/Derrell Brown)
5. "Corner of My Eye" (Larry Saltis/Mike Slamer/Charlie Mitchell)
6. "Turn It Up" (Joe Curiale/Jimmy Haddox)

=== Single (45 RPM) ===
Warner Bros. Records (released 1987)

Track listing:

1. "What I Want" (Side A)
2. "Turn It Up" (Side B)

=== Yulesville By Various Artists (Warner Bros. Records) ===
B8 "What I Want (For Christmas)"
