= Game Over (TV series) =

2004 American animated television series

- The Smashenburn family
- Genre: Animated sitcom
- Created by: David Sacks
- Voices of: E. G. Daily; Rachel Dratch; Artie Lange; Lucy Liu; Patrick Warburton; James Sie; Marie Matiko
- Composer: Kevin Riepl
- Country of origin: United States
- Original language: English
- No. of seasons: 1
- No. of episodes: 6 (1 unaired)

Production
- Executive producers: David Sacks; Dave Goetsch; Ross Venokur; Jason Venokur; Marcy Carsey; Tom Werner; Caryn Mandabach
- Running time: 22 minutes
- Production companies: Never Give Up Productions; Venokur Goetsch Venokur; Carsey-Werner Productions; DKP Studios

Original release
- Network: UPN
- Release: March 10 – April 2, 2004

Game Over is an American adult animated sitcom, created by David Sacks and produced by Carsey-Werner Productions. The series was broadcast on UPN in 2004 and was cancelled after five episodes.

Game Over (the title was inspired by the phrase "game over" that commonly concludes video games) focuses on what happens to video game characters after the game ends and recounts the lives of the Smashenburns, a far-from-ordinary suburban family that lived in an alternate video game universe. The series made numerous references to video games and even featured certain game characters in cameo appearances. For example, the first episode features Crash Bandicoot on a Got Milk? billboard and an extended sequence set in the world of Oddworld: Abe's Oddysee.

Marisa Tomei originally voiced Raquel Smashenburn in the series' unaired pilot episode, but scheduling problems had Lucy Liu take over the role for the actual series.

Game Over was heavily hyped by UPN before its debut. It generally received positive press on its airing. A total of six episodes were produced; five of these episodes aired over the span of one month, while the sixth never aired and only appears on the complete series DVD.

== Characters ==
- Rip Smashenburn (voiced by Patrick Warburton) is a Grand Prix driver who races every day and crashes his car all the time.
- Raquel Smashenburn (née Grunkmeyer) (voiced by Lucy Liu) is a covert agent who likes to fight monsters.
- Alice Smashenburn (voiced by Rachel Dratch) is a cynical yet socially conscious 14-year-old girl and part of a beach volleyball team.
- Billy Smashenburn (voiced by E. G. Daily) is a 13-year-old boy who is hoping to become a rapper.
- Turbo (voiced by Artie Lange) is a purple walrus-dog creature and the Smashenburn family's talking 300-pound pet. Turbo robs pawn shops and smokes cigars, and shows an inclination towards teenage girls.
- Sam Chang (voiced by James Sie) and Dark Princess Chang (voiced by Marie Matiko) are kung-fu-fighting Shaolin monks and the Smashenburns' next door neighbors.

== Episodes ==
No.	Title	Original release date	Prod. code
0	"Pilot"	N/A	100
1	"Meet the Smashenburns"	March 10, 2004	101
2	"Basic Win-stincts"	March 17, 2004	103
3	"All Work and All Play"	March 26, 2004	104
4	"Into the Woods"	April 2, 2004	105
5	"Alice and the C.A.T.s"	April 2, 2004	102
6	"Monkey Dearest"	N/A	106

== Home media ==
Anchor Bay Entertainment released the series as Game Over: The Complete Series on DVD in North America on June 28, 2005.
