= Quicksand: No Escape =

1992 American thriller TV film

- DVD cover
- Genre: Thriller
- Written by: Peter I. Baloff; Dave Wollert
- Directed by: Michael Pressman
- Starring: Donald Sutherland; Tim Matheson; Felicity Huffman
- Music by: Paul Chihara
- Country of origin: United States
- Original language: English

Production
- Executive producers: Patricia Finnegan; Sheldon Pinchuk
- Producers: Peter I. Baloff; David W. Wollert
- Cinematography: Jacek Laskus
- Editor: Millie Moore
- Running time: 84 minutes
- Production company: MCA Television

Original release
- Network: USA Network
- Release: March 4, 1992

Quicksand: No Escape is a 1992 American thriller television film directed by Michael Pressman starring Donald Sutherland, Tim Matheson, and Felicity Huffman. Kaley Cuoco appears in her debut role.

== Plot ==
A hard-working architect is pulled into intrigue when his wife hires a private investigator to make sure he is just working late. The private eye sees an opportunity to frame him for a murder instead.

== Cast ==
- Donald Sutherland as Murdoch
- Tim Matheson as Scott Reinhardt
- Felicity Huffman as Joanna Reinhardt
- Timothy Carhart as Charlie Groves
- Kaley Cuoco as Connie Reinhardt
- Jay Acovone as Det. Harris
- Amy Benedict as Ginger
- Joe Fowler as Preston Denning
