= Coca-Cola Telecommunications =

Syndication unit of Columbia Pictures Television

Coca-Cola Telecommunications, Inc.
- Type: Division
- Industry: Television syndication
- Founded: November 24, 1986; 39 years ago
- Defunct: December 31, 1987; 38 years ago
- Fate: Folded into Columbia Pictures Television Distribution
- Successor: Columbia Pictures Television
- Headquarters: Burbank, California, U.S.
- Area served: Worldwide
- Parent: Coca-Cola Television

Coca-Cola Telecommunications, Inc. (CCT) was a first-run syndication unit of Columbia Pictures Television (then a unit of The Coca-Cola Company) created on November 24, 1986, that was a merger between CPT's first-run syndication division and The Television Program Source, Inc. The Television Program Source was a joint-venture between Alan Bennett, former King World president Robert King, and CPT that was founded in early October 1984.

== History ==
The company was brought on to revive the Screen Gems line, used for obscure and vintage never-before-seen programming from Columbia Pictures Television, and assisted in colorization of black-and-white television shows, such as the 1950s programs The Real McCoys and The Life and Legend of Wyatt Earp, and bought a minority interest in Color Systems Technology.

In 1987, Coca-Cola acquired The Television Program Source, Inc. outright, which included its programs and personnel, and Bob King became president of Coca-Cola Telecommunications. The company was responsible for the production and distribution of first-run syndicated, basic cable, pay TV, and home shopping programming, as well as home video distribution. Also that year, Coca-Cola Telecommunications and colorizing company CST Entertainment had set up a joint venture, Screen Gems/CST Entertainment, in order to share profits from sales to TV, basic cable and home video, in order to distribute the libraries of vintage films and TV series.

Following the success of the program The New Gidget, Coca-Cola Telecommunications, Inc. set out to produce pilots for weekly series, such as one based on the Ben Casey character, and partnered with different companies on several projects such as Gunfighter, in partnership with Tribune Entertainment, which was produced by Sonny Grosso and Larry Jacobson of Grosso-Jacobson Productions, which was pitched for the Tribune Broadcasting stations, and one with DIC Entertainment on a 90-minute block of three-animated half-hour programs, which went by two different names, Funday Sunday, if it ran on Sunday, or Funtastic Saturday, if they wanted to go head to head with the Kidvid blocks on Saturday mornings.

In March 1987, a new company partnered with Paramount Domestic Television, Inc. to set up international advertising sales and hold the barter spots for all programs that were produced by Coca-Cola Telecommunications, which included future projects from Merv Griffin Enterprises and Paramount Domestic Television, Inc., and Orbis Communications would be the third part of the venture, in order to sell national ad time for the company, and sell not only Coke and Paramount's barter sales, but also its own.

In late March 1987, Screen Gems/CST Entertainment was renamed Screen Gems Classicolor, with the CST venture available in excess of $100 million, and featured Color Systems' library of 101 feature films and a catalog of TV series, which included The Abbott and Costello Show. Color Systems Technology was paid by Screen Gems to colorize the B&W titles from the joint venture library, and Screen Gems Classicolor's revenue was paid from distribution of the combined Screen Gems and CST libraries in the short-term, and color-converted versions of the titles would go into the pipeline by 1988. There were also plans to acquire additional features and TV shows for distribution and color conversion, and included many series from the Columbia Pictures Television library that were available for colorization, which included library series, as well as feature films that were originally released in the black-and-white format.

In May 1987, Coca-Cola Telecommunications partnered with Grosso-Jacobson Productions in order to develop productions in a non-exclusive pact, namely four made-for-television movies, which included The Gunfighters, Hounds of Hell, Nightfighters and Partington, which were offered to first-run syndication. The following month, Coca-Cola Telecommunications and HBO signed an agreement to co-produce and distribute 15 made-for-cable films that would be licensed for a foreign release, and commit as much as $70 million to the venture. The agreement stipulated that the projects were to be produced by HBO in-house, or third-parties, for HBO Pictures, and five of them would be produced by Coca-Cola Telecommunications. Production costs would be shared on all films, and under the terms of the deal, HBO would premiere the films and retain the domestic home video rights to the ten films, while CCT received domestic home video rights to the five films, as well as foreign rights of all 15 films in the agreement.

On December 31, 1987, CCT was shut down, a result of Columbia/Embassy Television merging with Tri-Star Television to form a new Columbia Pictures Television. This, in turn, resulted in the loss of two key executives who had run CCT, namely Herman Rush and Peter Seale, as well as Columbia/Embassy Television president Barbara Corday, with CCT merging with the remaining distribution divisions of Columbia/Embassy Television, becoming a new Columbia Pictures Television Distribution. It included most of the original Columbia/Embassy distribution team who had survived the merger, including Barry Thurston, who had headed Columbia/Embassy's syndication business and took over all of the responsibilities for CCT. Shortly afterwards, two of the company's top executives, namely Herman Rush and Peter Seale, and other executives of CCT attempted to form a new company that would be a successor to CCT, distributing certain properties that CCT previously distributed, but those negotiations fell through.

== Programming ==
=== Miscellaneous ===
- Dinosaucers (1987): A DIC Enterprises production.
- Hulk Hogan's Rock 'N' Wrestling (1985 special episode only): A DIC Enterprises production in association with the World Wrestling Federation.
- Merv Griffin at the Coconut Ballroom (1987 pilot)
- Sylvanian Families (1987): A DIC Enterprises production, currently owned by WildBrain.
- That's My Mama Now (1987 pilot)
- Starcom: The U.S. Space Force (1987): A DIC Enterprises production, currently owned by WildBrain.
- Meet Julie (1987)

=== Originally slated to be distributed by Colex Enterprises ===
All such properties were distributed in association with the company by LBS Communications unless otherwise noted; an (*) indicates a property distributed explicitly by the company.

- Dennis the Menace: Dinosaur Hunter (1987): A DIC Enterprises production. Sony Pictures Television handles domestic syndication, while WildBrain handles international syndication.
- Hardcastle and McCormick (1983–1986): A Stephen J. Cannell production, Sony Pictures Television handles domestic syndication and digital distribution, while The Cannell Studios handles international syndication.
- New Monkees (1987)
- Punky Brewster (1984–1987)*: NBCUniversal Syndication Studios handles home media distribution and worldwide syndication. Home media distribution and international syndication are currently licensed to Shout! Studios and Metro-Goldwyn-Mayer Television, respectively.

=== Previously distributed by Colex Enterprises ===
This was distributed in association with the company by LBS Communications.

- The New Gidget (1986-1987)

=== Previously distributed by The Television Program Source ===
Produced by Mark Goodson, both properties are currently owned by Fremantle North America.

- The Price Is Right (1985–1986):
- Card Sharks (1986–1987)

=== Advertising sales by LBS Communications ===
- The Real Ghostbusters (1986–1987): A DIC Enterprises production.
- What's Happening Now!! (1985–1987)

=== Attempted series ===
Both series were to be revivals.

- Now You See It, to be hosted by new host Jack Clark, never made it past the pilot stage.
- Match Game, to be hosted by original host Gene Rayburn, never materialized.
