= All Signs of Death =

American unaired TV pilot, produced in 2010

- Genre: Murder Mystery; Drama; Comedy
- Written by: Charlie Huston
- Directed by: Alan Ball
- Starring: Ben Whishaw; Clayne Crawford
- Country of origin: United States
- Original language: English

Production
- Executive producers: Alan Ball; Charlie Huston
- Production company: Your Face Goes Here Entertainment

Original release
- Network: HBO

All Signs of Death is a unaired television pilot based on the 2009 novel The Mystic Arts of Erasing All Signs of Death by Charlie Huston, who also wrote the teleplay. Huston served as executive producer along with Alan Ball who directed the pilot. Filmed, then shelved, in 2010, it was produced as part of Ball's multi-project contract with HBO.

== Story ==
All Signs of Death tells the story of Webster "Web" Fillmore Goodhue, a typical twentysomething slacker living in Los Angeles, California who becomes a crime scene cleaner and discovers that the work helps to ease the pain of his own past trauma. However, Web soon finds himself at the center of a murder mystery that eventually puts his own life in jeopardy.

== Cast ==
- Ben Whishaw as Webster "Web" Fillmore Goodhue
- Clayne Crawford as Chev
- James Read as Westin Nye

== Production ==
Ball became aware of Huston through Charlaine Harris, author of the popular series of novels that inspired Ball's HBO series True Blood. Huston confided to Ball that he was thinking about pitching his then latest novel as a series, and the two worked on the pilot's development. Speaking of the book, Ball said "It's not so much about the crime, it's about the personal story of the central character and his journey back to being fully connected with his life after some very traumatic things."

On shooting the pilot, Ball stated that he wanted to stay "away from the overlit, stylized noir for a more frantic, contemporary, naturalistic style."

Filming took place over 11 days in various parts of Los Angeles in June and July, 2010.

HBO announced on December 8, 2010 that it would not be taking All Signs of Death to series. The pilot remains unaired.
