= The Day Room =

1986 play by Don DeLillo

First edition (publ. Scribner)

The Day Room is a play written by Don DeLillo and first produced at the American Repertory Theater in Cambridge, Massachusetts, in April 1986. It is DeLillo's first play. Since its premiere, it has been produced in New York City in 1987, and in Chicago in 1989 and 1993, among others. The first international production was in Auckland, New Zealand, in 1995. A portion of the play was published in Harper's Magazine in September 1986 as "A Visit from Dr. Bazelon".

== Plot ==
The play concerns characters in a psychiatric hospital in which the distinctions between patients and staff gradually blur. The play is written in an absurdist style reminiscent of Beckett and Ionesco, and eschews linear plot in favor of a non-traditional exploration of such themes as empathy, personal identity, fear of death, and the seeming impossibility of meaningful communication. In line with the transformation of identities, the eponymous room of the first act becomes a vaguely defined motel room in the second. As a single memorable example of the absurdist tone of the piece, one of the asylum patients of the first act appears in the second act as Figure in Straitjacket, performing as a television set for the bulk of the remaining action.

DeLillo stated in a New York Times interview about the play that

I began to sense a connection, almost a metaphysical connection, between the craft of acting and the fear we all have of dying. It seemed to me that actors are a kind of model for the ways in which we hide from the knowledge we inevitably possess of our final extinction. There's a sense in which actors teach us how to hide.

== Reception ==
The Day Room was praised by critics for its intellectualism and black comedy, as well as for being a new direction for DeLillo. The critic Frank Rich, however, criticized it for being "One Flew Over the Cuckoo's Nest as it might be rewritten by a pretentious undergraduate who has just completed the midterm, if not all the required reading, for a survey course in the works of Pirandello, Beckett and Stoppard." Upon its Chicago premiere, critic Richard Christianson gave the play similarly mixed reviews, writing that, while he enjoyed it, the play is "a little too 'literary,' a mite too obviously crafted and pretentious."
