= It Takes Two (1988 film) =

- Theatrical release poster
- Directed by: David Beaird
- Written by: Richard Christian Matheson; Thomas Szollosi
- Produced by: Robert Lawrence
- Starring: George Newbern; Leslie Hope; Kimberly Foster; Barry Corbin; Anthony Geary
- Cinematography: Peter Deming
- Edited by: David Garfield
- Music by: Carter Burwell
- Production companies: MGM; United Artists
- Distributed by: United Artists
- Release date: July 13, 1988 (United States)
- Running time: 79 minutes
- Country: United States
- Language: English

It Takes Two is a 1988 American romantic comedy film directed by David Beaird and starring George Newbern, Leslie Hope, and Kimberly Foster. Screenwriters Richard Christian Matheson and Thomas E. Szollosi had previously collaborated on the 1987 teen comedy Three O'Clock High. It had initially been announced for release under the title My New Car.

== Plot ==
Daydreamer Travis Rogers is on the verge of marriage to Stephanie Lawrence, whom he has known his entire life, but is starting to have doubts after his coworkers discourage him and his future father-in-law tries to force him into the manure business. A late-night talk with Stephi allays his fears somewhat, but they remain and he doubles down on his inexplicable, to his family and friends, need to buy an imitation Lamborghini sports car.

Travis goes to Dallas to buy the car and meets a seductive saleswoman named Jonni Tigersmith. They go on a wild test drive, and she convinces him to buy the car with all of the expensive options, barring the extended warranty. The car is immediately revealed to be a lemon, however, and forces him to miss his rehearsal dinner. He discovers that the repairs will be incredibly expensive because he didn't pay for the warranty, and he is arrested after causing a scene at the showroom.

Jonni finds out that her boss, Dave, has been putting inferior parts into the new cars and runs into Travis at a nightclub after getting fired. The pair sleep together, and the morning after Travis calls his father to proclaim his love for Jonni. His father talks him down and tells him of his own pre-wedding dalliance. Jonni overhears this and decides to help Travis get the car he originally paid for. They break into the showroom with the help of a mechanic named Wheel, who had also been fired, and steal the car. They are briefly chased around the city by Dave, who soon crashes into the showroom, setting off the explosives set by Wheel.

Stephi, left jilted at the altar, realizes that she hadn't been listening to Travis's worries and complaints in the lead-up to the wedding, and tells the congregation the story of how she lost her childhood pony by not paying attention and leaving the gate open, and compares the situation to her relationship with Travis. Travis then arrives, having realized that the love and family that Stephi offers is what he needs, and has returned to marry her and work with his father on the ranch, rather than in the manure business. Jonni had travelled with Travis to the wedding, and leaves a paid-in-full receipt in the car outside the venue. Travis and Stephi drive to a motel and spend their wedding night as husband and wife.

== Cast ==
- George Newbern as Travis Rogers
- Leslie Hope as Stephanie Lawrence
- Kimberly Foster as Jonni Tigersmith
- Barry Corbin as George Lawrence
- Anthony Geary as Wheel
- Frances Lee McCain as Joyce Rogers
- Patrika Darbo as Dee Dee
- Marco Perella as Dave
- Bill Bolender as Judd Rogers
- Mickey Jones as Bucholtz

== Reception ==
Writing in the Los Angeles Times, Michael Wilmington described It Takes Two as "a modestly budgeted comedy with...a frowzy plot" that nevertheless "has relentless pace and snap, real comic vigor." The Time Out Film Guide calls the film "One of the better movies of hit-and-miss director Beaird".
