= My Chauffeur =

1986 film by David Beaird

- Theatrical release poster
- Directed by: David Beaird
- Written by: David Beaird
- Produced by: Marilyn Jacobs Tenser
- Starring: Deborah Foreman; Sam Jones; Sean McClory; Penn & Teller; Howard Hesseman; E. G. Marshall
- Cinematography: Harry Mathias
- Edited by: Richard E. Westover
- Music by: Paul Hertzog
- Production companies: Crown International Pictures; Marimark Productions
- Distributed by: Crown International Pictures
- Release date: January 24, 1986
- Running time: 97 minutes
- Country: United States
- Language: English
- Box office: $4.7 million

My Chauffeur is a 1986 American comedy film produced by Crown International Pictures and Marimark Productions starring Deborah Foreman, Sam J. Jones, Howard Hesseman and E.G. Marshall. It was written and directed by David Beaird. The original music score was composed by Paul Hertzog with additional music by The Wigs.

The film was released on January 24, 1986 and was marketed with the tagline: "Some women will, some won't... some men do, some don't. This driver might go everywhere, do anything...for your sizzling backseat pleasure".

== Synopsis ==
Casey Meadows is a free-spirited young woman working as a dishwasher in an upscale restaurant. One day she receives a hand-delivered job offer as a driver for Brentwood Limousine Service. The company manager, McBride is appalled at Casey's young, brash presence...and the fact that she's a woman in an all-male establishment. McBride soon learns that Mr. Witherspoon, the company owner, personally handpicked her and offered the letter of employment. McBride reluctantly agrees to hire her, but warns her that she will be fired if she steps out of line.

Casey experiences sexism and chauvinism from her fellow (mostly older) limo drivers. While frustrated at the ostracism and intolerance of her new co-workers, she manages to find some kindness and support in Jeremy O'Brien, an older Irish driver. Jeremy convinces her to tough it out and give the hidebound men time to adjust to her presence. She agrees to stay.

Casey is routinely given bad assignments that are engineered to get her fired. Her first job is driving a high, oversexed and hungover British punk rock singer named Cat Fight (Leland Crooke) to his concert. Casey finds Cat Fight in a motel bed with his three women backup dancers in a drug-induced stupor. Realizing she'll be fired if she doesn't deliver him to the concert, she dumps a cooler of ice water on Cat Fight's bed and manages to get him and the three women into the car and to the arena just in time for the concert.

Casey is then assigned to transport Battle Witherspoon (Sam J. Jones), an arrogant, heartless, workaholic executive who is stalking his ex-girlfriend. The angry ex tells him she can no longer stand to be with him and says she is pregnant with another man's child. Casey, sympathetic, offers a visibly devastated Battle some liquor from the onboard bar. After consuming an excessive amount, Battle runs out of the car and strips his clothes off, running through a park and making a huge nuisance of himself. He finally returns to the limo and passes out. Not knowing where Battle's residence is, Casey takes him to her home so he can recover from the day's events. The following morning, he awakens and is back to his old hateful self, hurtfully insulting Casey before leaving.

Unknown to Casey, Battle Witherspoon is the son of Mr. Witherspoon (E.G. Marshall), the owner of the limo company. Mr. Witherspoon orders Battle to check out another of his companies upstate in Sonoma. Casey is assigned to drive Battle up north, much to their mutual displeasure. Halfway through the trip, the car overheats and breaks down in a remote location on the highway. Battle and Casey walk off in search of a phone. After walking and bickering for several hours, night falls and they get caught in a rainstorm. Casey sprains her ankle and is unable to walk. Battle continues his walk while carrying Casey in his arms. They finally find a rustic cabin occupied by a hillbilly couple, who invite them to spend the night. Both are put in a bedroom with a single bed and after another one of their arguments, Battle kisses her. The following morning, Battle proposes marriage but Casey refuses, fearing he will return to his emotionally distant ways.

Casey is next assigned to transport a Middle Eastern sheik to a meeting. The sheik (Teller) is approached by a con artist (Penn Jillette) out for a wild night on the town. After Casey returns, she is fired by McBride after learning that police and government agents have been searching for the missing sheik.

Realizing that he's fallen for Casey, Battle starts making some positive changes in his life and continues his efforts to court Casey. He slowly wins Casey over and takes her home to meet his father. When she arrives at the estate, she experiences Deja Vu, recalling the times she played in the Witherspoon mansion as a child. It turns out that Casey's mother was formerly employed by Witherspoon. But shockingly, Witherspoon reveals that he is Casey's biological father, making Battle and Casey siblings. Jeremy then comes into the room with Giles, another limo driver, ordering Giles to confess what he knows about Casey's paternity. He reveals Witherspoon is not Casey's biological father, Giles is. Giles was in a relationship with Casey's mother before she and Witherspoon spent their "little weekend together". Giles (who was especially hostile to Casey) reveals that he denied paternity in order that Casey would receive stable financial support as an heiress to the Witherspoon fortune.

The movie ends with Battle and Casey's wedding. As they climb into the back of a Brentwood Limousine, the driver is McBride, who has received his comeuppance for his misogynistic treatment of Casey.

== Main cast ==
Actor	Role
Deborah Foreman	Casey Meadows
Sam J. Jones	Battle Witherspoon
Sean McClory	Jeremy O'Brien
Howard Hesseman	McBride
E.G. Marshall	Mr. Witherspoon
Mark Holton	Doughboy
Penn Jillette	Bone
Teller	Abdul
Julius Harris	Johnson
Laurie Main	Jenkins
John O'Leary	Giles
Stanley Brock	Downs
Jack Stryker	Moses
Vance Colvig	Doolittle (as Vance Colvig Jr.)
Ben Slack	Dupont
Elaine Wilkes	Colleen
Diana Bellamy	Blue Lady
Leland Crooke	Catfight
Robin Antin	Bimbo
Cindy Beal	Beebop
Sue Jackson	Boom Boom
Darian Mathias	Dolly
Carlton Miller	Amy
Stan Foster	LaRue

== Box office ==
The film opened on January 24, 1986 on 1,253 screens, Crown International Pictures' widest release at the time. Daily Variety reported, based on data provided by the studio, that it opened at number one in the United States with an opening weekend gross of $4,781,488, making it Crown's first number one weekend film. The following day, it noted that there was industry skepticism about the figure reported and that based on sample data, the film grossed only between $2.2 to $3.6 million which would have ranked it between third and sixth. The following weekend, on the advice of legal counsel, Crown did not release any data but Daily Variety estimated that it grossed $890,000 with a 10-day total of $3,750,000. No more data was reported by Crown but Daily Variety reported it grossed $270,000 in its third weekend for a total of $4,075,000.

== Reception ==
Metacritic, which uses a weighted average, assigned the film a score of 37 out of 100, based on 6 critics, indicating "generally unfavorable" reviews.

== See also ==
- List of American films of 1986
