= Key West (TV series) =

American comedy-drama series

- Key West: Denise Crosby, Geno Silva, Jennifer Tilly, Brian Thompson, T.C. Carson, & Fisher Stevens, 1993
- Created by: David Beaird
- Starring: Denise Crosby; Fisher Stevens; Jennifer Tilly; Brian Thompson; Lara Piper; T.C. Carson
- Composer: Pray for Rain
- Country of origin: United States
- Original language: English
- No. of seasons: 1
- No. of episodes: 13

Production
- Running time: 60 minutes
- Production companies: Stonehenge Productions; Viacom Productions

Original release
- Network: Fox
- Release: January 19 – June 29, 1993

Key West is an American comedy-drama series set and filmed in Key West, Florida. Thirteen episodes aired on Fox from January to June 1993. It was created by David Beaird. The show was produced by Viacom Productions.

== Plot ==
Seamus O'Neill, played by Fisher Stevens, is a factory worker from New Jersey who dreams of being a writer. When he wins the lottery, he uses his newfound wealth to move to Key West to pursue his writing career, where his idol Ernest Hemingway had lived. Seamus finds the island inhabited by eccentrics. He tries to get a job for The Meteor, a local newspaper, wishing to relive the life of its most famous employee, Hemingway. This brings him into conflict with the paper's editor, Roosevelt Cole (Ivory Ocean), who remarks "You want to report on the Spanish Civil War?" Eventually Seamus is hired on a probationary period. In a later episode it is revealed Seamus is once again poor as his lottery winnings were seized due to taxation and multiple unpaid debts, and it will be several years before his next annuity check resumes. Seamus then decides to put everything into writing, money worries or not.

In addition to Stevens, Jennifer Tilly, Denise Crosby, and Brian Thompson led the large ensemble cast as the town's high-class prostitute, conservative mayor and eccentric sheriff, respectively.

== Cast and characters ==
- Fisher Stevens as Seamus O'Neill
- Denise Crosby as Chaucy Caldwell
- Brian Thompson as Sheriff Cody Jeremiah Jefferson
- Kim Myers as Dr. Reilly Clarke
- Terrence 'T.C.' Carson as Abednigo "JoJo" Nabuli
- Jennifer Tilly as Savannah Sumner
- Geno Silva as Hector Allegria
- Ivory Ocean as Roosevelt "King" Cole
- Leland Crooke as Paul "Gumbo" Beausoleil
- Lara Piper as Rikki
- Michael Covert as Hunter Farmer
- Jennifer Barlow as Flame

== Episodes ==
| No. | Title | Directed by | Written by | Original release date |
|---|---|---|---|---|
| 1 | "Pilot" | David Beaird | David Beaird | January 19, 1993 |
| 2 | "The Second Day in Heaven" | David Beaird | David Beaird | January 26, 1993 |
| 3 | "The Great Unknown" | Geoffrey Nottage | David Beaird | February 2, 1993 |
| 4 | "Less Moonlight" | Christopher Leitch | David Beaird | February 9, 1993 |
| 5 | "Pieces of a Man" | Geoffrey Nottage | Tom Chehak | February 16, 1993 |
| 6 | "The Greening" | David Beaird | David Beaird | February 23, 1993 |
| 7 | "Act of God" | James A. Contner | Milo Bachmann | March 2, 1993 |
| 8 | "Gimme Shelter" | Chuck Bowman | Kathryn Baker | March 9, 1993 |
| 9 | "Crossroads" | James Frawley | Tom Chehak | March 16, 1993 |
| 10 | "We the People" | John Nicolella | Story by : Allan Marcil & Richard Clayton Woods; Teleplay by : Kathryn Baker & Craig Volk | June 1, 1993 |
| 11 | "Compadres" | Nancy Malone | Craig Volk | June 8, 1993 |
| 12 | "The System" | Christopher Leitch | John Steppling | June 22, 1993 |
| 13 | "Heavy Metal, Heavy Hearts" | Geoffrey Nottage | Craig Volk | June 29, 1993 |
