= Scorchers =

1991 film by David Beaird

- Redesigned Scorchers DVD cover
- Directed by: David Beaird
- Written by: David Beaird
- Produced by: Morrie Eisenman and Richard Hellman
- Starring: Faye Dunaway; Denholm Elliott; James Earl Jones; Emily Lloyd; Jennifer Tilly
- Narrated by: Leland Crooke (opening and closing monologues)
- Cinematography: Peter Deming
- Edited by: David Garfield
- Music by: Carter Burwell
- Production company: Goldcrest Films
- Distributed by: Rank Film Distributors (United Kingdom); Media Home Entertainment through Fox Video (United States)
- Release date: March 1991
- Running time: 88 minutes
- Countries: United States; United Kingdom
- Language: English

Scorchers is a 1991 ensemble drama written and directed by David Beaird with a cast of Faye Dunaway, James Earl Jones, Denholm Elliott, Leland Crooke and Emily Lloyd. The film is based on David Beaird's 1985 stage play of the same name which premiered at the Equity Waiver Theater in Los Angeles, also featuring Leland Crooke in the cast.

== Plot ==
Scorchers takes place in Cajun Louisiana on the wedding night of a young woman named Splendid (played by Emily Lloyd). Splendid is scared to death of what will happen in the bedroom with her new husband Dolan (James Wilder) and her father, Jumper (Leland Crooke), finds himself having to coax his daughter to submit to the groom.

Meanwhile, Talbot (Jennifer Tilly) comes to terms with the fact that her husband has not been satisfied at home and has been cheating on her, as the town prostitute, Thais (Faye Dunaway) shares her wisdom on the ways of men—all this takes place while the town bartender, Bear (James Earl Jones) and the town drunk, Howler (Denholm Elliott), debate the finer points of music and life.

== Cast ==
- Faye Dunaway as Thais
- James Earl Jones as Bear
- Denholm Elliott as Howler
- Leland Crooke as Jumper
- Emily Lloyd as Splendid
- Jennifer Tilly as Talbot
- James Wilder as Dolan
- Luke Perry as Ray Ray
- Anthony Geary as Preacher
- Kevin Michael Brown as Sugar Cat
- Michael Covert as Pie Boy
- Saxon Trainor as Renee
- Patrick Warburton as Balford

The role of Splendid was originally going to be played by Heather Graham, but she was fired and replaced by Emily Lloyd.

== Soundtrack ==
Title	Composer	Performer	Master Provided by	Courtesy of
Les Flammes D'Enfer	Traditional	Mamou	Jungle Productions/Austin, Texas	
Tit Galop Pour Mamou	Dewey Balfa	Mamou	Jungle Productions	Flat Town Music Co.
Bayou Teche	Nathan Abshire	Mamou	Jungle Productions	Flat Town Music Co.
Jolie Blonde	Traditional	Mamou	Jungle Productions	
La Louisiane	Steve LaFleur	Mamou	Jungle Productions	Stephen LaFleur Music
Symphony No. 5 - Adagietto	Gustav Mahler	The Budapest Festival Orchestra	Ivan Fischer	Delta Music, Inc.

== Home media ==
The DVD was released by Trinity Home Entertainment in January 2005, but in full screen and without any bonus material. However, the DVD does have an opening monologue by Leland Crooke that was absent from the original VHS release.
