= Marie Matiko =

American actress

- Born: Marie Lan Matiko; September 12, 1970 (age 55); Los Angeles County, California, U.S.
- Occupation: Actress
- Years active: 1999–present

Marie Matiko (born September 12, 1970) is an American actress.

== Early life ==
Marie Matiko is of Chinese, Japanese and Filipino descent, born in Los Angeles County and grew up in Huntington Beach. She grew up wanting to become a concert pianist. In high school, she auditioned for The Young Americans, where she was taught singing, dancing and performing in a conservatory setting.

She was an environmental engineering major at UCLA. While still in college, she auditioned for the first national tour of Miss Saigon. She traded an ROTC scholarship for the role of "Gigi/Mimi" when she was picked by producer Cameron Mackintosh for the first national tour of Miss Saigon. While on the road, she continued taking academic classes at community colleges. She was inspired by The Joy Luck Club to pursue film acting and after leaving Miss Saigon, Matiko returned to Los Angeles to pursue it.

In 2008, Matiko finished her degree from UCLA during the Hollywood Writer's Strike.

== Film and television ==
Matiko is known for her starring roles as Julia in The Art of War and as Betty in the 2006 film Date Movie.

For her performance in The Art of War, she garnered the nomination for Best Actress in a Feature Film at the 2001 AX Awards (the Asian-American Film and TV awards). Matiko was one of the AX Awards Top 20 Newcomers in 2006.

In New Line Cinema's The Corruptor, produced by Oliver Stone, Marie Lan Matiko debuted on film as the love interest of Chow Yun-Fat. Challenging acting work from the start, she won the role of May, a heroin-addict and indentured servant trapped by NY Chinatown's Triads. Under the direction of James Foley (Glengarry Glen Ross), Chow Yun-Fat and Mark Wahlberg share textured scene work alongside Matiko.

In Fox's 2007 release Date Movie, Matiko made her comedic debut alongside Fred Willard and Jennifer Coolidge, playing Betty.

In the 2007 Dennis the Menace Christmas, she played Mrs. Walsh-Mellman, Dennis's grade school teacher. Matiko also voices the group therapist of Dennis's frustrated parents.

Additional film and television credits include Universal's Mystery Men, TBS's Counterstrike, CBS's The District and Michael Mann's Robbery Homicide Division. Matiko voiced Gong Li's parts in Michael Mann's Miami Vice and Dark Princess Chang in UPN's Game Over. She was also in Forbidden Warrior, where Matiko plays Seki, the forbidden warrior.

Matiko was also on the popular TV series Xena playing the roles of Pao Ssu and K'ao Hsin, the twin daughters of Xena's spiritual mentor, Lao Ma. Her characters are on several collectible Xena:The Warrior Princess trading cards.

== Outside acting ==
- Matiko founded and ran the non-profit Vivace Conservatory, with co-founder Ariel Felix. Vivace is a non-profit performing arts school located in Los Angeles Chinatown. The purpose of the organization is to nurture pride, self-discipline and passion in disadvantaged inner-city youth and minorities for the arts. in regards to Vivace, she stated:

I created a school where all my kids are mostly Asian Americans. And I just created a place where kids can be creative and be artistically free and celebrate who they are. And my other staff members are people from "Miss Saigon," the Broadway show, and also my partners from the TV show Chicago Hope. So I also feel like we are good role models for them to actually see it, I think it is a really good thing.

- Matiko was the celebrity spokesperson for the California Asian American Democratic Caucus.
- Matiko also sits on the board of advisors for the San Diego Asian American Film Festival.

== Filmography ==
=== Film ===
Year	Title	Role	Notes
1999	The Corruptor	May	
1999	Mystery Men	Disco Girl	
2000	The Art of War	Julia Fang	
2002	The Sum of All Fears	Captain Vicky Shiro	
2002	Attack on the Queen	Monica Chang	TV movie
2003	Gang of Roses	Zang Li	
2004	Max Havoc: Curse of the Dragon	Aya	
2005	Rupture	Sandy Lee	Short
2005	The Civilization of Maxwell Bright	Mai Ling	
2005	Forbidden Warrior	Seki	
2006	Date Movie	Betty Lan Orchid	
2006	A Dennis the Menace Christmas	Mrs. Walsh-Mellman	Video
2007	Diggers	Keiko	Short
2009	Tea and Remembrance	Rita	Short

=== Television ===
Year	Title	Role	Notes
1999	Xena: Warrior Princess	Pao Ssu/K'ao Hsin	Episode: "Purity" & "Back in the Bottle"
2001	The District	Linda Ching	Episode: "Night Shift"
2002	Robbery Homicide Division	Aimee	Episode: "Life Is Dust"
2004	The Division	Jessica Marita	Episode: "Be Careful What You Wish For"
2004	Game Over	Dark Princess Chang (voice)	Main cast
