= Jennifer Phang =

American filmmaker

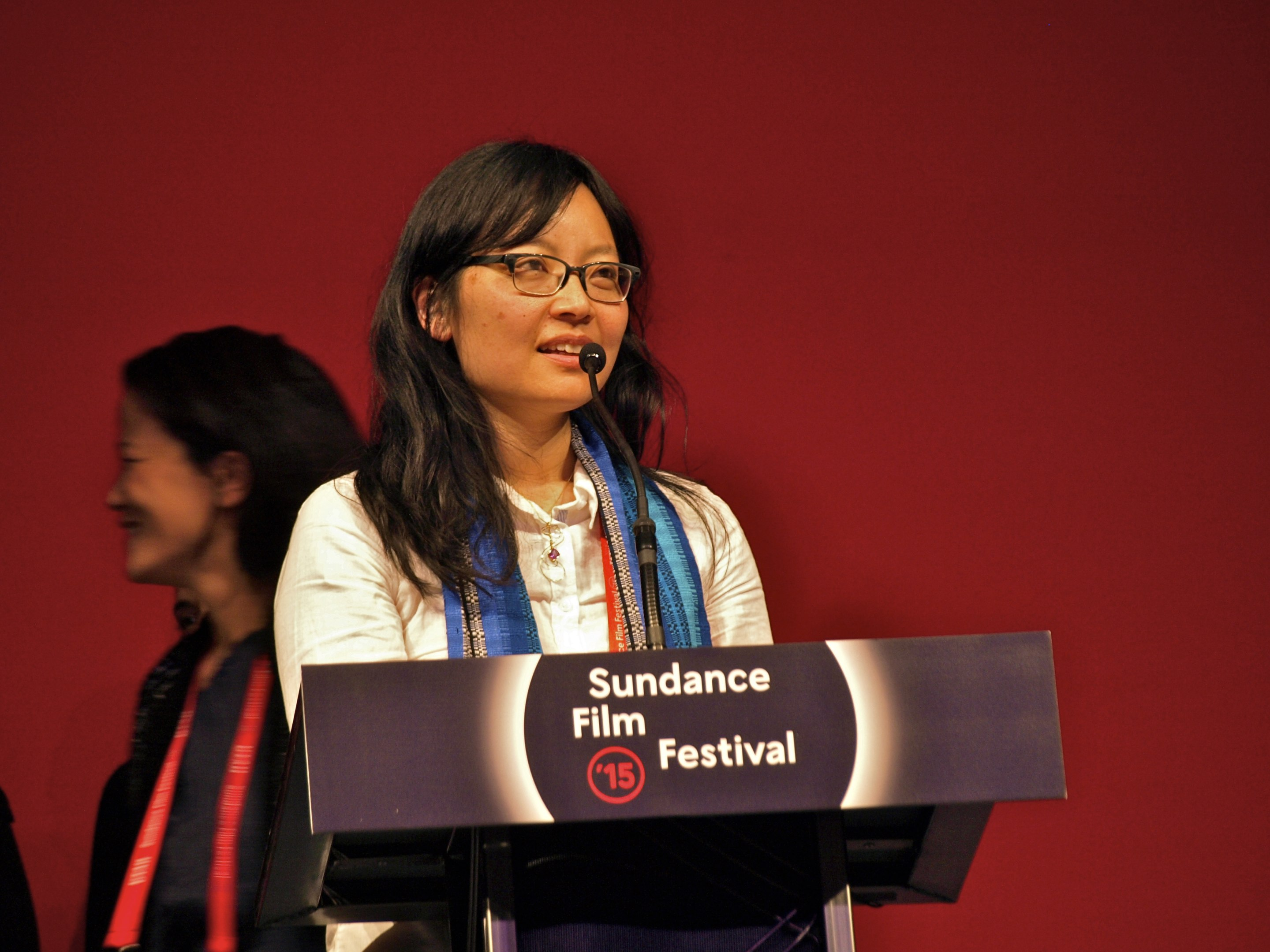
- Jennifer Phang at Sundance 2015 Awards
- Born: Berkeley, California
- Education: Pomona College (BA); American Film Institute (MFA)
- Occupations: Film director, screenwriter, producer

Jennifer Phang (/pɑːŋ/ PONG) is an American filmmaker (writer, director, producer), most known for her feature films Advantageous (2015) and Half-Life (2008). Advantageous premiered at the 2015 Sundance Film Festival, winning a Special Jury Award for Collaborative Vision, and was based on her award-winning short film of the same name. Half-Life premiered at the 2008 Sundance Film Festival and won "Best Film" awards at a number of film festivals including the Gen Art Film Festival, the San Francisco International Asian American Film Festival (now known as CAAMFest) as well as an "Emerging Director Award" at the Asian American International Film Festival.

== Early life ==
Phang grew up in the San Francisco Bay Area. She was born in Berkeley, California and is of mixed Chinese Malaysian and Vietnamese heritage. She graduated from Pomona College with a Bachelor of Arts in Media Studies, and also graduated from the American Film Institute with a Masters of Fine Arts (M.F.A.) in Film Directing. She has also participated in the San Francisco Film Society Women Filmmaker Fellowship.

In 2008, Phang was named as one of the "25 new Faces of Independent Film" by Filmmaker Magazine. In 2015, she was selected as one of six Women at Sundance Fellows. In 2016 she was also selected for the Warner Bros. Television Directors' Workshop where she met the director/producer of Breaking Bad and Game of Thrones, Michelle MacLaren, who became her mentor.

== Career ==
=== Feature films ===
Phang's debut feature film that she directed and wrote was entitled Half-Life (2008) and it starred Sanoe Lake, Julia Nickson-Soul, Leonardo Nam, James Eckhouse, Susan Ruttan and Alexander Agate. The film premiered at the 2008 Sundance Film Festival in the New Frontiers section, and also screened at the Gen Art Film Festival (where it won a Best Feature award), the San Francisco International Asian American Film Festival (where it won a Best Narrative award), the Asian American International Film Festival (where Phang won the "Emerging Director Award"), the Fairy Tales International Gay & Lesbian Film Festival (where it won the Visionary Award), the Tokyo International Film Festival (where it was in-competition and was nominated for the Tokyo Grand Prix), the Mannheim-Heidelberg International Film Festival (where it was also in competition and nominated for the Main Award), and the International Women's Film Festival in Seoul, Korea (where it was opening night film). The film received a limited theatrical release on December 1, 2009.

After Half life, Phang's follow-up project was, Look For Water, and Crazy Beats Strong Every Time. Phang received a grant from the Sundance Institute Cinereach Grant, the Sundance Annenberg Feature Film Fellowship, and the Tribeca Film Festival to support these developments.

Phang's follow up film that she directed, wrote and edited was Advantageous (2015), which was based on her award-winning short film of the same name. The film starred Jacqueline Kim, Ken Jeong, James Urbaniak, Freya Adams and Samantha Kim. The film also premiered in competition at the 2015 Sundance Film Festival (nominated for the Grand Jury Prize for U.S. Dramatic films), where it won the Grand Jury Prize for Collaborative Vision given to both Phang and star Jacqueline Kim with the inscription: "We are honoring two individuals for their unique collaborative vision. Two women that between them wrote, starred and co-edited a beautiful parable about a mother's love, sacrifice and society's worship of youth." At the 2015 Los Angeles Asian Pacific Film Festival, the film won, under the Narrative Feature category, Best Director (Jennifer Phang), Best Editor (Jennifer Phang and Sean Gillane), Best Musical Score (Timo Chen), and star Jacqueline Kim also won the Linda Mabalot Renaissance Spirit Award for her performance. Advantageous was released to Netflix June 2015.

In May 2022, it was announced Phang was slated to direct the upcoming fourth film in the Descendants film franchise. Descendants: The Rise of Red was released July 12, 2024 on Disney+ and became Disney Branded Television's most-viewed premiere ever on the streaming service. The film received mixed reviews from critics. On film aggregator site Rotten Tomatoes, 57% of critics reviews of the film were positive, with an average rating of 5.10/10.

=== Short films ===
Phang directed, wrote and edited a short film entitled Advantageous (2012) - the basis of the 2015 feature film of the same name - which imagined various scenarios and stories that took place in the future. The film won a Best Science Fiction Film award at the Rhode Island International Horror Film Festival and also the Golden Reel Award for Best Short Film at the 2012 Los Angeles Film Festival. It was also nominated for "Best Short Film" at Fantastic Fest, the Cleveland International Film Festival, the Philadelphia Asian American Film Festival, the Philadelphia Film Festival, the Asian American International Film Festival, the San Diego Asian Film Festival, the San Diego Comic-Con Independent Film Festival, and the Urbanworld Film Festival.

Other short films that Phang directed include Midnight Boycow (2007) starring Rex Lee and Love, Ltd. (2000), which Phang also co-wrote with Jeff Kirschenbaum.

=== Television ===
Phang has guest-directed on episodic series television, including for The Boys, Cloak & Dagger, Quantico, The Expanse, Riverdale, Major Crimes, The Exorcist, Proven Innocent, Stargirl and Resident Alien. She remarks that it is interesting to work in an established universe with characters already defined, and to direct a wide variety of actors who are already familiar with their characters. In her opinion, TV directing work, in addition to the extra income, improves her versatility and adaptability in her film projects.

=== Music videos and other media projects ===
Phang also directed and wrote a piece entitled Glass Butterfly, a narrative music video featuring intensive visual effects, currently being completed via San Francisco's Studio 400A.

=== Screenwriting ===
For her screenplay Look for Water, which she co-wrote with Dominic Mah, she was invited to the Sundance Screenwriters' Lab in June 2008. The screenplay has also received the Tribeca Film Festival L'Oreal Woman of Worth Vision Award, a Sundance CineReach grant, and a Sundance Institute Annenberg Feature Film Fellowship Grant.

=== Editing and producing ===
Phang has also edited and produced the feature film Target Audience 9.1 (2007), written and directed by Dominic Mah, produced the short film Sitter (2004) also written and directed by Dominic Mah, and served as executive producer for the short film Crazy Beats Strong Every Time (2011), directed and written by Moon Molson, and which was an official selection of the 2011 Sundance Film Festival. Phang also shares an editing credit on her 2015 feature Advantageous. Phang works closely with Premiere Pro and uses After Effects when dealing with VFX.

== Filmography ==
Short film

Year	Title	Director	Writer	Producer	Notes
1998	Terra Mea	Yes	No	No	
2000	Love, Ltd.	Yes	Yes	No	
2003	The Matrices	Yes	No	No	Also editor
2004	Sitter	No	No	Yes	
2007	Midnight Boycow	Yes	Yes	No	

Feature film

Year	Title	Director	Writer	Producer	Notes
1998	Still Life	Yes	No	No	
2008	Half-Life	Yes	Yes	No	
2015	Advantageous	Yes	Yes	Yes	Also editor end digital effects
2024	Descendants: The Rise of Red	Yes	No	No	

Television

Year	Title	Episode(s)
2016	The Exorcist	"Chapter Six: Star of the Morning"
2017	Major Crimes	"Cleared History"
2018	Riverdale	"Chapter Thirty-Two: Prisoners"
2018	The Expanse	"Fallen World"
2018	The Expanse	"Congregation"
2018	Quantico	"The Art of War"
2018–2019	Cloak & Dagger	"Funhouse Mirrors"
2018–2019	Cloak & Dagger	"Restless Energy"
2019	Proven Innocent	"In Defense of Madeline Scott, Part 1"
2019	The Boys	"The Innocents"
2019	Agents of S.H.I.E.L.D.	"From the Ashes"
2020–2022	Stargirl	"Shining Knight"
2020–2022	Stargirl	"Frenemies – Chapter Eleven: The Haunting"
2020–2022	Stargirl	"Frenemies – Chapter Twelve: The Last Will and Testament of Sylvester Pemberton"
2021	Secrets of Sulphur Springs	"Once Upon a Time"
2021	Resident Alien	"Sexy Beast"
2021	Resident Alien	"The Green Glow"
2021	Foundation	"Death and the Maiden"
2021	Foundation	"Mysteries and Martyrs"
2022	The Flight Attendant	"The Reykjavik Ice Sculpture Festival Is Lovely This Time of Year"
2022	The Flight Attendant	"Blue Sincerely Reunion"
2024	The Cleaning Lady	"From the Ashes"

== Awards ==
- 2015 Sundance Film Festival
- Winner, Special Jury Award for Dramatic Feature: Advantageous
- Nominee, Grand Jury Prize for Dramatic Feature: Advantageous
- LA Asian Pacific Film Fest
- Winner, Editing, score, and directing awards for Advantageous (feature) - 2015
- Winner, Golden Reel Award for Excellence in Short Film: Advantageous - 2013
- 2012 Rhode Island Horror Film Festival
- Winner, Best Science Fiction Film: Advantageous (Short)
- Asian American International Film Festival
- Winner, Best Narrative: Half Life - 2008
- Winner, Emerging Director Award for Best Feature: Half Life - 2008
- Nominee, Excellence in Short Filmmaking Award: Futurestate - 2013
- Austin Fantastic Fest
- Nominee, Short Film Award: Advantageous (short) - 2012
- Cleveland International Film Festival
- Nominee, Best Women's Short Film: Advantageous (short) - 2013
- Nominee, Best Live Action Short Film: Advantageous (short) - 2013
- Film Independent Spirit Awards
- Nominee, John Cassavetes Award: (2016) Shared with Jacqueline Kim, Robert M. Chang, Ken Jeong, Moon Molson, Theresa Navarro
- Gen Art Film Festival
- Winner, Best Feature: Half-Life - 2008
- Mannheim-Heidelberg International Film Festival
- Nominee, Main Award of Mannheim-Heidelberg: Half-Life - 2008
- Philadelphia Asian American Film Festival
- Nominee, Festival Prize: Advantageous (short) - 2012
- Philadelphia Film Festival
- Nominee, Jury Award for Best Short: Advantageous (short) - 2012
- San Diego Asian Film Festival
- Nominee, Jury Award for Best Narrative Short: Advantageous (short) - 2012
- San Diego Comic-Con Independent Film Festival
- Nominee, CCI:IFF Award for Best Science Fiction/Fantasy Film: Advantageous (short) - 2012
- Tokyo International Film Festival
- Nominee, Tokyo Grand Prix: Half-Life - 2008
- Urbanworld Film Festival
- Nominee, Jury Prize for Best Short: Advantageous - 2012
