= List of 1990 films based on actual events =

This is a list of films and miniseries released in 1990 that are based on actual events. All films on this list are from American production unless indicated otherwise.

== 1990 ==
- A Dangerous Man: Lawrence After Arabia (1990) – British biographical drama television film depicting the experiences of T. E. Lawrence and Emir Faisal of the Hejaz at the Paris Peace Conference, after the end of the First World War
- A Killing in a Small Town (1990) – crime drama television film based on the story of Candy Montgomery
- A Season of Giants (Italian: La primavera di Michelangelo) (1990) – American-Italian biographical drama television film depicting real life events of Michelangelo, his youth, his approach with art, his friendship with Leonardo da Vinci and Raphael, and his involvement in great political and religious events
- A Violent Life (Italian: Una vita scellerata) (1990) – Italian biographical drama film depicting real life events of goldsmith and sculptor Benvenuto Cellini
- After the Shock (1990) – disaster drama television film about the aftermath of the 1989 Loma Prieta earthquake that hit San Francisco on 17 October 1989
- An Angel at My Table (1990) – biographical drama film depicting a dramatization of the autobiographies of New Zealand author Janet Frame – following from when she grows up in a poor family, through her years in a mental institution, and into her writing years after her release
- Anything to Survive (1990) – Canadian-American disaster survival television film based on the true story of the Wortman family of Prince of Wales Island, Alaska
- Artificial Paradise (Slovene: Umetni raj) (1990) – Yugoslav biographical drama film portraying a fictionalized depiction of Fritz Lang's life in 1935
- The Austrian (French: L'Autrichienne) (1990) – French biographical drama film depicting the last days of Marie-Antoinette of Austria, showing her trial and execution
- Awakenings (1990) – biographical drama film telling the story of the story of neurologist Oliver Sacks who discovers the beneficial effects of the drug L-DOPA in 1969 administering it to catatonic patients who survived the 1917–1928 epidemic of encephalitis lethargica
- Bethune: The Making of a Hero (1990) – historical biographical drama film about the life and death of Norman Bethune, a Canadian physician who served as a combat surgeon during the Chinese Civil War
- Blood Oath (1990) – Australian drama film based on the real-life trial of Japanese soldiers for war crimes committed against Allied prisoners of war on the island of Ambon, in the Netherlands East Indies, such as the Laha massacre of 1942
- Call Me Anna (1990) – biographical drama television film about Patty Duke, detailing her long-time struggle with mental illness
- Captive of the Desert (French: La captive du désert) (1990) – French adventure drama film based in part on the experiences of Françoise Claustre who was captured by Chadian rebels in 1974, later joined by her husband, and the pair finally released in 1977
- Challenger (1990) – disaster drama television film based on the events surrounding the Space Shuttle Challenger disaster in 1986
- Chicago Joe and the Showgirl (1990) – British crime drama film inspired by the real-life Hulten/Jones murder case of 1944, otherwise known as the Cleft chin murder
- China Cry (1990) – biographical drama film based on the true story of Sung Neng Yee
- The Civil War (1990) – historical miniseries about the American Civil War
- Close-Up (Persian: کلوزآپ ، نمای نزدیک) (1990) – Iranian biographical drama film telling the story of the real-life trial of a man who impersonated film-maker Mohsen Makhmalbaf, conning a family into believing they would star in his new film
- The Court-Martial of Jackie Robinson (1990) – biographical drama television film about the early life of the baseball star in the army and in particular his court-martial for insubordination regarding segregation
- Crash: The Mystery of Flight 1501 (1990) – disaster drama television film telling the story about a bomb hoax aboard a passenger plane, usually advertised as being based on true events
- Cyrano de Bergerac (1990) – French-Hungarian historical comedy drama film depicting a fictionalisation following the broad outlines of Cyrano de Bergerac's life
- Dear Sarah (1990) – Irish biographical television film about Giuseppe Conlon who was wrongfully sentenced to twelve years imprisonment after being implicated as one of the Maguire Seven during the 1970s
- Death of a Doctor (Hindi: एक डॉक्टर की मौत) (1990) – Indian Hindi-language biographical drama film loosely based on the life of Dr. Subhash Mukhopadhyay, an Indian physician who pioneered the In vitro fertilisation treatment
- Diary for My Father and Mother (Hungarian: Napló apámnak, anyámnak) (1990) – Hungarian biographical drama film following a young student, who is orphaned as she grows to adulthood in the shadow of the 1956 Hungarian uprising
- Divided Loyalties (1990) – Canadian biographical drama television film about Mohawk leader Joseph Brant, portraying his "divided loyalties" between British and American allies during the American Revolutionary War
- Dr. Petiot (French: Docteur Petiot) (1990) – French crime drama film presenting the exploits of real-life serial killer Marcel Petiot during the Second World War
- The Dreamer of Oz: The L. Frank Baum Story (1990) – biographical drama television film depicting how L. Frank Baum came to create The Wonderful Wizard of Oz while undergoing and eventually overcoming professional and personal failures
- Europa Europa (German: Hitlerjunge Salomon) (1990) – German-French-Polish historical war drama film based on the 1989 autobiography of Solomon Perel, a German-Jewish boy who escaped the Holocaust by masquerading as a Nazi and joining the Hitler Youth
- Fall from Grace (1990) – biographical drama television film about the lives of Jim Bakker and his then-wife, Tammy Faye Bakker, during the 1980s
- Family of Spies (1990) – drama television film based on the espionage of John A. Walker Jr.
- Forbidden Nights (1990) – drama television film focuses on Judith Shapiro, an American teacher who falls in love with Liang Heng, a Chinese radical, trying to bring political reform to his homeland
- The Fourth Reich (1990) – South African biographical drama film revolving around the life of Robey Leibbrandt, a South African boxer who participated in the 1936 Olympic Games in Berlin
- Good Evening, Mr. Wallenberg (Swedish: God afton, Herr Wallenberg – En Passionshistoria från verkligheten) (1990) – Swedish biographical war drama film about Swedish World War II diplomat Raoul Wallenberg, who was instrumental in saving the lives of thousands of Hungarian Jews from the Holocaust
- Goodfellas (1990) – biographical war film narrating the rise and fall of mob associate Henry Hill and his friends and family from 1955 to 1980
- Hello Hemingway (1990) – Cuban drama film set in Havana in 1956, near the end of Fulgencio Batista's dictatorship
- Henry & June (1990) – biographical drama film telling the story of Anaïs Nin's relationship with Henry Miller and his wife, June
- Hiroshima: Out of the Ashes (1990) – historical war drama television film about the Atomic bombing of Hiroshima
- I Love You to Death (1990) – black comedy crime film loosely based on an attempted murder that happened in 1983, in Allentown, Pennsylvania, where Frances Toto repeatedly tried to kill her husband, Anthony
- I, the Worst of All (Spanish: Yo, la peor de todas) (1990) – Argentine biographical drama film about the life of Juana Inés de la Cruz
- Iron & Silk (1990) – Canadian action comedy drama film detailing Mark Salzman's journey to China after college to study Chinese wu shu, better known in the west as kung fu, and to teach English
- Jiao Yulu (Mandarin: 焦裕祿) (1990) – Chinese biographical film telling the story of Jiao Yulu overseeing the development of Lankao County in Henan from 1962 to 1964
- Judgment (1990) – drama television film loosely based on Louisiana priest, Gilbert Gauthe who faced a widely publicized criminal trial for child sexual abuse and was sentenced to 20 years in prison
- Kawashima Yoshiko (Cantonese: 川島芳子) (1990) – Hong Kong historical crime drama film based on the life of Yoshiko Kawashima, a Manchu princess who was brought up as a Japanese and served as a spy in the service of the Japanese Kwantung Army and Manchukuo during the Second World War
- Korczak (1990) – biographical war film about Polish-Jewish humanitarian Janusz Korczak
- The Krays (1990) – British biographical crime drama film based on the lives and crimes of the British gangster twins Ronald and Reginald Kray, often referred to as The Krays
- The Long Walk Home (1990) – historical drama film about the Montgomery bus boycott
- The Man Inside (1990) – drama film about German writer and undercover journalist, Günter Wallraff
- Max and Helen (1990) – war drama television film based on Nazi-hunter Simon Wiesenthal's 1962 prosecution of the head of a German factory whom he learns was a murderous labor camp commandant
- Mayumi (Korean: 마유미) (1990) – South Korean drama film based on the life of Kim Hyon Hui, a North Korean agent whose Japanese teacher was Yaeko Taguchi, a Japanese abductee; she was paroled in 1998, and 12 years later she met Yaeko's son Kochi and told him that his mother was still alive
- Memphis Belle (1990) – British-American war drama film about the 25th and last mission of an American Boeing B-17 Flying Fortress bomber, the Memphis Belle, based in England during World War II
- Miracle Landing (1990) – disaster drama television film based on an in-flight accident aboard Aloha Airlines Flight 243 that occurred in April 1988
- Mountains of the Moon (1990) – biographical drama film depicting the 1857–1858 journey of Richard Francis Burton and John Hanning Speke in their expedition to Central Africa, which culminated in Speke's discovery of the source of the Nile River and led to a bitter rivalry between the two men
- Murder in Mississippi (1990) – crime drama television film dramatizing the last weeks of civil rights activists Michael "Mickey" Schwerner, Andrew Goodman and James Chaney, and the events leading up to their disappearance and subsequent murder during Freedom Summer in 1964
- My Mother's Castle (French: Le château de ma mère) (1990) – French biographical adventure film about Marcel Pagnol's early life, a sequel to My Father's Glory
- My Father's Glory (French: La Gloire de mon père) (1990) – French biographical drama film about Marcel Pagnol's early life
- Nambugun (Korean: 남부군: 남한의 북한 빨치산) (1990) – South Korean war drama film based upon the experiences of Lee Tae, a war correspondent and pro-North Korean Partisan during the Korean War
- The Nasty Girl (German: Das schreckliche Mädchen) (1990) – West German drama film based on the true story of Anna Rosmus, a young woman who investigated her town's Nazi past
- Pacific Heights – psychological thriller film based on a true story about a couple who rent out an apartment to a crazy scam man
- Portrait of a Marriage (1990) – British biographical drama miniseries detailing the real-life love affair between Vita Sackville-West and Violet Keppel, as well as the strength of Vita's enduring marriage to the diplomat Harold Nicolson
- Reversal of Fortune (1990) – biographical mystery film recounting the true story of the unexplained coma of socialite Sunny von Bülow, the subsequent attempted murder trial, and the eventual acquittal of her husband, Claus von Bülow
- Rock Hudson (1990) – biographical drama television film telling the story of Phyllis Gates and Rock Hudson's marriage, written after Hudson's 1985 death from AIDS
- The Rose and the Jackal (1990) – Western adventure television film revolving around Union agent Allan Pinkerton, falling in love with female spy Rose O'Neal Greenhow
- Sandino (1990) – Spanish-Nicaraguan biographical drama film about Nicaraguan revolutionary Augusto César Sandino
- Santha Shishunala Sharifa (Kannada: ಸಂತ ಶಿಶುನಾಳ ಶರೀಫ) (1990) – Indian Kannada-language biographical drama film based on the life of acclaimed saint poet Shishunala Sharif who wrote several moral poems striving towards social reformation
- Schweitzer (1990) – adventure biographical film about Albert Schweitzer's life in Africa
- Secret Weapon (1990) – American-Australian biographical drama television film depicting the true story of Mordechai Vanunu, the Israeli nuclear technician who revealed to the world his country's nuclear weapons capabilities
- Shoot to Kill (1990) – biographical drama miniseries depicting the events that led to the 1984–86 Stalker Inquiry into the shooting of six terrorist suspects in Northern Ireland in 1982 by a specialist unit of the Royal Ulster Constabulary (RUC), allegedly without warning (the so-called shoot-to-kill policy); the organised fabrication of false accounts of the events; and the difficulties created for the inquiry team in their investigation
- Silent Scream (1990) – biographical crime drama film about convicted murderer Larry Winters
- Spymaker: The Secret Life of Ian Fleming (1990) – biographical drama television film depicting the life of Ian Fleming, creator of the James Bond spy character, retracing his playboy youth, his expulsion from several colleges, his experiences as a newspaper writer and his tour of duty for the British intelligence agency during World War II
- Stalingrad (Russian: Сталинград) (1990) – Soviet-Slovak-East German-American war drama film about the eponymous Battle of Stalingrad
- The Strange Affliction of Anton Bruckner (1990) – biographical drama television film about the life of Anton Bruckner
- Sudie and Simpson (1990) – romantic drama television film based on Sarah Flanigan Carter's autobiographical novel about growing up in World War II-era Georgia, United States
- Summer Dreams: The Story of the Beach Boys (1990) – biographical drama television film covering the history of the Beach Boys
- Too Young to Die? (1990) – crime drama television film loosely based on the story of Attina Marie Cannaday, who along with David Gray killed Ronald Wojcik with a knife, in Harrison County, Mississippi, on 3 June 1982
- Unspeakable Acts (1990) – biographical drama television film telling the story of child psychologists Dr. Laurie and Joseph Braga and their involvement in one of the worst child sex abuse scandals in the U.S
- Vincent & Theo (1990) – biographical drama film about the Dutch painter Vincent van Gogh and his brother Theo, an art dealer
- Voices Within: The Lives of Truddi Chase (1990) – drama miniseries about Truddi Chase, a woman who was diagnosed with dissociative identity disorder who allegedly had 92 separate personalities
- Voyage of Terror: The Achille Lauro Affair (1990) – thriller drama miniseries based on the 1985 Achille Lauro hijacking
- When You Remember Me (1990) – biographical drama television film based on the life of Michael Patrick Smith, a young man who filed a lawsuit in the early '70s that led to improved conditions for nursing home patients nationwide
- White Hunter Black Heart (1990) – adventure drama film depicting a thinly disguised account of Peter Viertel's experiences while working on the 1951 film The African Queen, which was shot on location in Africa at a time when location shoots outside of the United States for American films were very rare
- Young Guns II (1990) – Western action film following the life of Billy the Kid, in the years following the Lincoln County War in which Billy was part of "The Regulators" – a group of around six highly skilled gunmen avenging the death of John Tunstall – and the years leading up to Billy's documented death
