= China Soul =

American singer

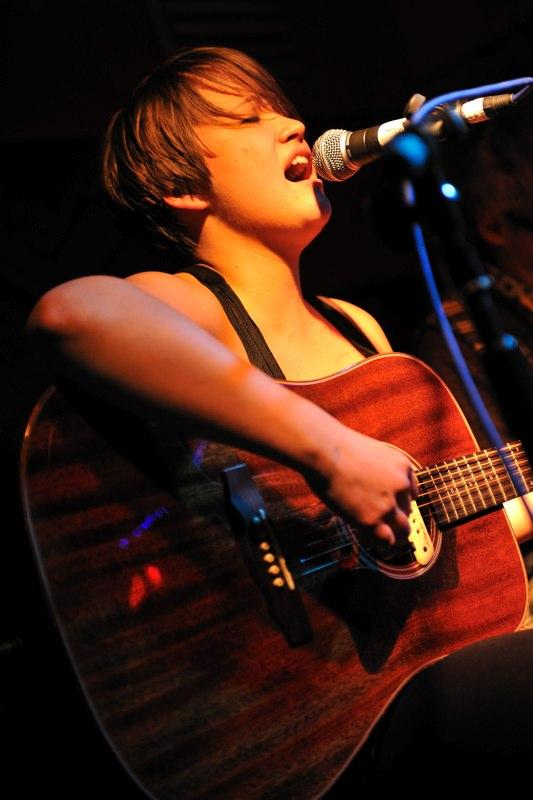
- Soul performing live in 2009

Background information
- Born: China Alexandra Soul; 5 May 1988 (age 38); Tampa, Florida, U.S.
- Origin: Los Angeles, California, U.S.
- Genres: Pop, rock, folk
- Occupation: Singer-songwriter
- Instruments: Vocals, guitar
- Years active: 2002–2011, 2014
- Parents: David Soul (father); Julia Nickson (mother)

China Alexandra Soul (born 5 May 1988) is an American-British former singer-songwriter who resides in England. Her debut album, Secrets & Words, was released in the UK on 25 October 2010 through AS:Music. She is the daughter of actor-singer David Soul and actress Julia Nickson.

== Career ==
Soul began playing music and writing songs at the early age of 14. Songs such as debut single "Cold", title track "Secrets & Words", "Into the White" and "Long Way Back" all appear on Soul's debut album, Secrets & Words, and were written when she was just 16.

In April 2014, Soul joined the cast of Chaplin's Circus, playing the part of Ruth Etting, an American singing star and actress of the 1920s and '30s.

=== Debut album ===
In late 2008, Soul met Chaz Jankel of The Blockheads (formerly Ian Dury and the Blockheads) and Jankel began producing and co-writing what was to become Soul's debut album Secrets & Words. Soul's debut single "Cold" was released through AS:Music in the United Kingdom on 18 October 2010. The album was released one week later on 25 October 2010. In November 2010, Soul was invited onto the Dermot O'Leary BBC Radio 2 show for a live session and interview where she played "Cold" and a cover of the Rod Stewart song "You're in My Heart". On 1 May 2011, Soul appeared on the Aled Jones BBC Radio 2 show for a live interview and performance of her follow-up single "Breathe". On 18 May 2011, she appeared on the Steve Wright in the Afternoon BBC Radio 2 show with her father. She also received spot-plays on shows such as the Jools Holland BBC Radio 2 Show and appeared on ITV's Lorraine Kelly show for an interview.

"Cold" was also released as a limited edition 7" white vinyl through FooFar records in January 2010. Its B-side was an a cappella cover of the Nina Simone song "Be My Husband". Soul's follow-up single "Breathe" was released 25 April 2011.

== Personal life ==
Soul is the only daughter of actor/singer David Soul and actress Julia Nickson. She has five half-brothers from her father's previous marriages. Born in Tampa, Florida, Soul grew up in Los Angeles, California. She studied creative writing at Orange County High School of the Arts. In June 2006, Soul relocated to London and attended Royal Holloway, University of London where she studied English Literature and Creative Writing.

== Discography ==
=== Albums ===
Year	Title
2010	Secrets & Words

=== Singles ===
Year	Title	Album
2010	"Cold"	Secrets & Words
2011	"Breathe"	Secrets & Words
