= Armageddon Game =

- Star Trek: Deep Space Nine episode
- Episode no.: Season 2 Episode 13
- Directed by: Winrich Kolbe
- Written by: Morgan Gendel
- Production code: 433
- Original air date: January 31, 1994

Guest appearances
- Darleen Carr as E'Tyshra; Rosalind Chao as Keiko O'Brien; Peter White as Sharat; Larry Cedar as Nydrom

Episode chronology
← Previous "The Alternate"	Next → "Whispers"
- Star Trek: Deep Space Nine season 2

"Armageddon Game" is the 33rd episode of the American science fiction television series Star Trek: Deep Space Nine. It is the 13th episode of the second season.

Set in the 24th century, the series follows the adventures on Deep Space Nine, a space station located near a stable wormhole between the Alpha and Gamma quadrants of the Milky Way Galaxy, near the planet Bajor. In this episode Chief O'Brien and Dr. Bashir help two races to destroy their biological weapons, but both governments want to ensure no technical knowledge of the weapons can survive.

This television episode aired in syndication starting on January 31, 1994.

== Plot ==
Dr. Bashir and Chief O'Brien have spent the past week helping two races, the T'Lani and the Kellerun, dismantle deadly biological weapons known as "Harvesters". They assure the T'Lani and Kellerun ambassadors that all files related to the Harvesters have been destroyed, so as to prevent them from ever being created again.

When the moment comes to destroy the final Harvester, two Kellerun soldiers enter the laboratory and begin shooting the scientists, T'Lani and Kellerun alike. Bashir and O'Brien overpower the soldiers, but a drop of the Harvester liquid falls on O'Brien's skin. To escape, they are forced to beam down to the surface of the planet they are orbiting.

The T'Lani and Kellerun ambassadors inform Commander Sisko that O'Brien and Bashir died in an accident, and provide a recording purportedly showing the deaths of the entire science team due to an automated security routine. The senior staff of Deep Space Nine grieve the loss of their crewmates, and Sisko informs O'Brien's wife Keiko of his death.

Meanwhile, Bashir and O'Brien are stranded in an abandoned town on the planet's surface. O'Brien tries to repair a broken communications system in order to inform the T'Lani of the Kelleruns' apparent betrayal. Bashir discovers that O'Brien has been infected by the Harvester and, as O'Brien's condition begins to deteriorate, is forced to take over the repair effort.

Keiko insists that the recording of the supposed accident has been falsified: the video shows O'Brien drinking coffee in the afternoon, something she is certain he would never do. Sisko and Lt. Dax travel in a runabout vessel to visit the site of the "accident", where Dax investigates O'Brien and Bashir's runabout and finds evidence that its logs have been altered.

The T'Lani and Kellerun ambassadors show up together at Bashir and O'Brien's hideout. They reveal that the attack on the science team was a joint endeavor meant to erase all knowledge that could potentially be used to make Harvesters, and prepare to execute Bashir and O'Brien. Sisko and Dax rescue them by transporting them to their runabout. The T'Lani and Kellerun demand their return and fire upon the runabout when Sisko refuses; but Sisko deceives them by escaping safely in the other runabout.

As Chief O'Brien recovers from the Harvester poisoning back on Deep Space Nine, Keiko is stunned to discover that he does drink coffee in the afternoon.

== Writing ==
The episode was written by Morgan Gendel, who also wrote the story for "The Inner Light", a Hugo Award–winning episode of Star Trek: The Next Generation. The episode's title was chosen by fellow Deep Space Nine writer Robert Hewitt Wolfe as an homage to the title of a 1967 episode of Star Trek: The Original Series: "A Taste of Armageddon".

== Reception ==
Zack Handlen, reviewing the episode in 2012 for The A.V. Club, said there was "nothing seriously wrong" with the episode, and was happy with the writing of the characters. Tor.com gave it 6 out of 10. Doux Reviews called it a "fun, well-written episode" and gave it 3 out 4.

The episode was nominated for an Emmy award for hairstyles.

== Releases ==
It was released on LaserDisc in Japan on June 6, 1997, as part of the half season collection 2nd Season Vol. 1, which had 7 doubled sided 12" discs. The discs had English and Japanese audio tracks.

"Armageddon Game" was released on VHS, paired with "Whispers" on one cassette.

On April 1, 2003, Season 2 of Star Trek: Deep Space Nine was released on DVD video discs, with 26 episodes on seven discs.

This episode was released in 2017 on DVD with the complete series box set, which had 176 episodes on 48 discs.
