= Shadowplay (Star Trek: Deep Space Nine) =

- Star Trek: Deep Space Nine episode
- Episode no.: Season 2 Episode 16
- Directed by: Robert Scheerer
- Written by: Robert Hewitt Wolfe
- Production code: 436
- Original air date: February 21, 1994

Guest appearances
- Philip Anglim as Vedek Bareil; Noley Thornton as Taya; Kenneth Mars as Colyus; Kenneth Tobey as Rurigan

Episode chronology
← Previous "Paradise"	Next → "Playing God"
- Star Trek: Deep Space Nine season 2

"Shadowplay" is the 36th episode of the science fiction television series Star Trek: Deep Space Nine. It is the 16th episode of the second season.

Set in the 24th century, the series follows the adventures on Deep Space Nine, a space station located adjacent to a stable wormhole between the Alpha and Gamma quadrants of the Milky Way Galaxy, near the planet Bajor. In this episode, Deep Space Nine's shapeshifting security chief Odo and science officer Dax investigate mysterious disappearances of the population of a village in the Gamma Quadrant; meanwhile, Major Kira becomes romantically involved with the Bajoran priest Vedek Bareil.

The episode was directed by Robert Scheerer and written by Robert Hewitt Wolfe.

== Plot ==
Dax and Odo investigate an unusual particle field emanating from a planet in the Gamma Quadrant; they discover the field is coming from a small village's power generator. The village magistrate, Colyus, tells them 22 people have disappeared without a trace in the past few days. Odo and Dax offer to help investigate the disappearances; but the oldest villager, Rurigan, seems unconvinced that the villagers will ever be found.

The next day, Odo interviews Rurigan's granddaughter, Taya, whose mother has disappeared. The two find common ground in that they are both orphans; during the course of their conversation, Taya reveals that the villagers never leave their valley. Rurigan assures Odo that searching beyond the valley would be pointless. Apparently no one has thought about searching beyond the valley or ever considered leaving it.

Taya brings Odo and Dax to the edge of the valley. When Dax leaves the valley, a device from the village vanishes from her hand. Taya reaches past the edge of the valley, and her arm begins to disappear. The three return to the village to share their findings: the entire village, including its citizens, is a hologram created by the reactor's particle field. The reactor has fallen into disrepair and is breaking down, causing the villagers to disappear one by one.

They convince the villagers to let Dax shut down the reactor and repair it before it stops functioning completely. When she does so, the village and all the villagers vanish – except Rurigan. He explains that when an alien empire known as the Dominion arrived on his home planet, he fled to an abandoned planet and recreated the world he had lost; but now he admits that none of it was real. However, Odo argues that Taya and the others are real and deserve a chance to live. Dax and Rurigan repair the reactor, restoring the village, including the missing people. Before he and Dax leave, Odo realizes how close he has grown to Taya, and demonstrates his abilities by morphing into a toy that Taya played with earlier.

Meanwhile, back on Deep Space Nine, Major Kira begins a romance with Vedek Bareil; the bartender Quark had Bareil invited to the station to distract Kira from a criminal operation he was planning, but she sees through the scheme and apprehends Quark's accomplice. Jake Sisko begins taking engineering lessons from Miles O'Brien, but eventually admits to his father that he doesn't want to join Starfleet.

== Reception ==
In IGN's review of season 2, they said this and "The Alternate" were "good Odo episodes".

In 2013, Tor.com said this was a "magnificently constructed episode" that explored the idea of subverted expectations, and rated the episode 8 out of 10.

== Releases ==
This and "Paradise" were released on VHS in the United Kingdom paired on one cassette (VHR 2871).

On April 1, 2003 Season 2 of Star Trek: Deep Space Nine was released on DVD video discs, with 26 episodes on seven discs.

This episode was released in 2017 on DVD with the complete series box set, which had 176 episodes on 48 discs.
