= Harry's Hong Kong =

- Genre: Drama
- Written by: Richard Alan Simmons
- Directed by: Jerry London
- Starring: David Soul; Michael Preston; Mel Harris
- Music by: Dominic Frontiere
- Country of origin: United States
- Original language: English

Production
- Executive producers: Aaron Spelling; Douglas S. Cramer
- Producer: James L. Conway
- Production location: Hong Kong
- Cinematography: Dennis C. Lewiston
- Editor: Benjamin A. Weissman
- Running time: 120 minutes
- Production company: Aaron Spelling Productions

Original release
- Network: ABC
- Release: May 8, 1987

Harry's Hong Kong is a 1987 American television film directed by Jerry London.

== Cast ==
- David Soul as Harry Petros
- Mike Preston as Max Trumble
- Mel Harris as Fay Salerno
- Jan Gan Boyd as Sally Cheng
- Lisa Lu as Rose
- Julia Nickson as Mei Ling
- James Hong as Mr. Yu
- Rosanna Huffman as Mrs. Hamilton
- David Hemmings as Jack Roarke
- Russell Wong as Sergeant Lee
- Robert Easton as American Tourist

== Production ==
The film was shot on location in Hong Kong. Julia Nickson became engaged with David Soul during filming.
