= Funny About Love =

1990 American romantic comedy film

- Theatrical release poster
- Directed by: Leonard Nimoy
- Written by: Norman Steinberg; David Frankel
- Based on: "Convention of the Love Goddesses" in Esquire Magazine by Bob Greene
- Produced by: Jon Avnet; Jordan Kerner
- Starring: Gene Wilder; Christine Lahti; Mary Stuart Masterson
- Cinematography: Fred Murphy
- Edited by: Peter E. Berger
- Music by: Miles Goodman
- Production companies: Duffy Films; Avnet/Kerner Productions
- Distributed by: Paramount Pictures
- Release date: September 21, 1990
- Running time: 101 minutes
- Country: United States
- Language: English
- Box office: $8.1 million

- Farrah Fawcett, "Funny About Love", publicity still
- Gene Wilder, Farrah Fawcett, "Funny About Love", publicity still
- Mary Stuart Masterson, Gene Wilder, Christine Lahti and Farrah Fawcett. "Funny About Love", publicity still
- Gene Wilder, Farrah Fawcett, "Funny About Love", publicity still

Funny About Love is a 1990 American romantic comedy film directed by Leonard Nimoy and starring Gene Wilder in his first romantic lead along with Christine Lahti and Mary Stuart Masterson. With a screenplay by Norman Steinberg and David Frankel, the film is based on the article "Convention of the Love Goddesses" in Esquire Magazine by Bob Greene. The film was a critical and commercial failure.

== Plot ==
New York cartoonist Duffy Bergman marries gourmet chef Meg Lloyd. Meg wants to have a baby. Duffy agrees, but after unsuccessful attempts, Duffy encourages her to focus on her career and come back to the child issue later. After his mother's death, however, Duffy becomes fixated on wanting to have a child. Meg no longer sees this as a priority, as she's trying to open her own restaurant. The two start to have marital problems, leading to a separation.

Duffy travels to Arizona to speak at a Delta Gamma sorority convention. He explains that the Delta Gammas have always been his dream girls—his Love Goddesses. There he meets the much younger Daphne Delillo, and when she moves to New York to work as a network sports reporter, their attraction develops into a relationship. Daphne becomes pregnant. Duffy is happy to father a child, but uncomfortable with how fast this relationship is progressing. When she has a miscarriage, Daphne breaks up with him, believing that they were really staying in the relationship for the baby.

At his father's wedding, Duffy hears news about Meg and decides to go to her restaurant. He tries to reconcile with her, insisting that he doesn't care if they remain childless as long as he can be with her. Duffy discovers that Meg has adopted a baby boy.

== Cast ==
- Gene Wilder as Duffy Bergman
- Christine Lahti as Meg Lloyd Bergman
- Mary Stuart Masterson as Daphne Delillo
- Robert Prosky as Emil Thomas Bergman
- Stephen Tobolowsky as Hugo
- David Margulies as Dr. Benjamin
- Wendie Malick as Nancy
- Celeste Yarnall as Madge
- Anne Jackson as Adele Bergman
- Susan Ruttan as Claire
- Freda Foh Shen as Nurse
- Regis Philbin as himself
- Patrick Ewing as himself

== Production ==
The film was originally produced with Gene Wilder's character having three love interests - Christine Lahti, Mary Stuart Masterson, and Farrah Fawcett. After test screenings, a decision was made to cut all of Fawcett's scenes and re-edit. These edits were late in the production process, and it is believed that some promotional material was distributed with incorrect information. Fawcett is not credited in the movie.

== Release ==
=== Box office ===
Funny About Love opened in 1,213 theaters on September 21, 1990, and grossed $3,036,352 in its opening weekend, landing at #5, behind Goodfellas, Postcards from the Edge's second weekend, Ghost's eleventh, and Narrow Margin. The film would eventually gross $8,141,292 in the domestic box office.

=== Critical reception ===
The film was panned by critics. Based on 7 reviews, the film has a 0% rating on review aggregator website Rotten Tomatoes.

Janet Maslin of the New York Times gave the film a mixed review.

Infertility, divorce and loneliness shape the rambling plot, but they somehow do little to make the film substantial. ... Once the film settles down to follow Duffy and Meg in their eager efforts to conceive a baby, it develops at least some recognizable emotional content.

Roger Ebert of the Chicago Sun-Times had nothing but disdain for the film, giving it only a half of a star rating out of the four stars scale he used.

Funny About Love provides an opportunity to spend 101 minutes in the presence of the most cloying, inane and annoying dialogue I've heard in many a moon, punctuated only by occasional lapses into startling bad manners.

Gene Siskel was also scathing in his review on Siskel and Ebert's show At the Movies, remarking that unusually for him, during the screening of the film he stood up in horror at one scene taking place at a sporting event and said to Ebert, "I've seen it all."
