= Whispers (Star Trek: Deep Space Nine) =

- Star Trek: Deep Space Nine episode
- Episode no.: Season 2 Episode 14
- Directed by: Les Landau
- Written by: Paul Robert Coyle
- Production code: 434
- Original air date: February 7, 1994

Guest appearances
- Rosalind Chao as Keiko O'Brien; Susan Bay as Adm. Rollman; Todd Waring as Ens. DeCurtis; Philip LeStrange as Coutu; Hana Hatae as Molly O'Brien

Episode chronology
| ← Previous "Armageddon Game" | Next → "Paradise" |
- Star Trek: Deep Space Nine season 2

"Whispers" is the 34th episode of the American science fiction television series Star Trek: Deep Space Nine. It is the 14th episode of the second season.

Set in the 24th century, the series follows the adventures on Deep Space Nine, a space station located near a stable wormhole between the Alpha and Gamma quadrants of the Milky Way Galaxy, near the planet Bajor. In this episode, DS9's chief of operations Miles O'Brien suspects a conspiracy aboard the station.

== Plot ==
Miles O'Brien pilots a runabout through the wormhole en route to the Parada system. He records a personal log of recent events:

Two days ago, O'Brien returned from a meeting with the Paradas to discuss security measures for upcoming peace talks. The next morning, he awoke to find his wife Keiko and daughter Molly dressed and eating breakfast at 5:30 am; both seemed awkward and suspicious around him.

Upon reporting for duty, O'Brien found an officer had begun working on the security arrangements without him, apparently under orders from Commander Sisko. Shortly afterward, he saw Sisko and Keiko having a private discussion on the Promenade. When asked about it, Sisko claimed he was concerned about his son Jake's grades in Keiko's class, but Jake later told O'Brien his grades were fine.

At O'Brien's annual physical examination, Dr. Bashir gave O'Brien a clean bill of health only after an overly long and invasive examination. Additionally, problems O'Brien had been assigned to fix seemed to have been intentionally designed to make him spend additional time repairing them. Reviewing the other officers' logs, O'Brien discovered that Sisko and the others were observing his movements.

O'Brien persuaded Odo to investigate the others' suspicious behavior. But soon, at a meeting in Odo's office, Odo appeared to have joined the conspiracy as well; Sisko, Bashir, and Major Kira arrived to arrest and sedate O'Brien. He overpowered the others and fled the Promenade.

Through maintenance conduits, O'Brien made his way to the runabout Rio Grande and escaped. He contacted Admiral Rollman to warn her that the command crew of Deep Space Nine was under some hostile influence, but she ordered him to return to the station.

Now en route to the Parada system in the Gamma Quadrant, O'Brien is being pursued by the runabout Mekong. He eludes his pursuers and hides behind a moon, and then follows the Mekong to Parada II. There he finds Sisko and Kira with a pair of Paradan rebels, who promise that the explanation to the mystery of the past few days is behind a door. One of the Paradans shoots him, and when the door opens, Bashir is behind it—along with another O'Brien. It is revealed that the Paradan government abducted O'Brien and created a clone who believed he was the real O'Brien, but would assassinate the rebels at the peace talks.

As the clone dies, he asks the real O'Brien to tell Keiko he loves her.

== Production ==
"Whispers" is one of several episodes in which O'Brien is put under intense psychological pressure, jokingly dubbed "O'Brien Must Suffer" episodes; the producers and writers felt that such episodes would appeal to viewers due to O'Brien's everyman quality. Later "O'Brien Must Suffer" episodes include "Tribunal", "Visionary", "Hard Time", "The Assignment", "Honor Among Thieves", and "Time's Orphan".

== Reception ==
Writing for Tor.com, Keith DeCandido gave the episode a 7 out of 10; he lauded the rising tension throughout the episode, Les Landau's directing, Rosalind Chao playing the uncomfortable Keiko in O'Brien's presence, and the twist ending being "a magnificently played gut-punch". He felt the episode did not benefit from repeat viewings because it relied on the final revelation so strongly. The A.V. Club's Zack Handlen summarized his review by writing that "“Whispers” holds together and has a subversively dark conclusion", and also noted the similarities to Philip K. Dick's short story Impostor. Jamahl Epsicokhan, writing for Jammer's Reviews gave the episode 4 out of 4; he felt the ending was "tragic and moving", and that the episode as a whole is "a superbly envisioned episode that ranks among the most deftly constructed mysteries on Trek". In 2018, Vulture.com rated "Whispers" the 14th best episode of Star Trek: Deep Space Nine, praising its surprise ending. In 2017, this episode was noted as one featuring scary and/or eerie Star Trek content.

In 2015, Geek.com recommended this episode as "essential watching" for their abbreviated Star Trek: Deep Space Nine binge-watching guide.

In 2020, Den of Geek ranked this episode the 25th most scary episode of all Star Trek series up to that time.

== Releases ==
"Armageddon Game" and "Whispers" were released on VHS on one cassette in the UK, Star Trek: Deep Space Nine Vol. 17- Armageddon Game/Whispers (catalog number VHR 2870).

On April 1, 2003 Season 2 of Star Trek: Deep Space Nine was released on DVD video discs, with 26 episodes on seven discs.

This episode was released in 2017 on DVD with the complete series box set, which had 176 episodes on 48 discs.

== See also ==
- "Allegiance" (Star Trek: The Next Generation)
- "What are Little Girls Made Of?", an episode in Star Trek: The Original Series
