= The Operator (film) =

2000 film directed by Jon Dichter

- Movie Poster
- Directed by: Jon Dichter
- Written by: Jon Dichter
- Produced by: Jon Dichter
- Starring: Michael Laurence; Christa Miller; Stephen Tobolowsky; Brion James; Brad Leland; Jacqueline Kim
- Cinematography: Bert Guthrie
- Edited by: Michael Coleman; Darren Kloomok
- Music by: Victor Zupanc
- Production companies: Black Wolf Productions; Operator Films LLC
- Distributed by: First Look International
- Release date: March 4, 2000; (USA)
- Running time: 102 min.
- Country: United States
- Language: English
- Budget: $1,500,000

The Operator is a 2000 American film, starring Michael Laurence, Stephen Tobolowsky, Brion James, Brad Leland and Jacqueline Kim. It was written and directed by Jon Dichter.

== Plot ==
A telephone operator resolves to takes revenge on a rude and impolite customer.

== Cast ==
- Michael Laurence as Gary Wheelan
- Christa Miller as Janice Wheelan
- Stephen Tobolowsky as Doc
- Brion James as Vernon Woods
- Brad Leland as Husband
- Jacqueline Kim as The Operator

== Reception ==
On Metacritic it has a score 44 out of 100, indicating "mixed or average reviews". On Rotten Tomatoes it holds a 45% score.
