= Paradise (Star Trek: Deep Space Nine) =

- Star Trek: Deep Space Nine episode
- Episode no.: Season 2 Episode 15
- Directed by: Corey Allen
- Story by: Jim Trombetta; James Crocker
- Teleplay by: Jeff King; Richard Manning; Hans Beimler
- Production code: 435
- Original air date: February 14, 1994

Guest appearances
- Gail Strickland as Alixus; Julia Nickson as Cassandra; Steve Vinovich as Joseph; Michael Buchman Silver as Vinod; Erick Weiss as Stephen

Episode chronology
← Previous "Whispers"	Next → "Shadowplay"
- Star Trek: Deep Space Nine season 2

"Paradise" is the 35th episode of the science fiction television series Star Trek: Deep Space Nine, and it is the 15th episode of the second season.

Set in the 24th century, the series follows the adventures of the crew of the Starfleet-run space station Deep Space Nine. In this episode, Commander Sisko (played by Avery Brooks) and Chief O'Brien (played by Colm Meaney) find themselves stranded on a world populated by survivors of a shipwrecked expedition, where none of their devices will function.

== Plot ==
While on a reconnaissance mission in a runabout, O'Brien and Sisko discover human life signs on an uncharted planet. Beaming to the surface, they discover that a duonetic energy field has disabled their electronic devices and they cannot return to their runabout. They meet Joseph and Vinod, part of a group of colonists who became stranded ten years ago in a similar fashion. The leader of the colonists is Vinod's mother, Alixus; prior to becoming stranded, she was a philosopher critical of humans' dependence on technology.

One of the colonists, Meg, is dying and could be cured with the runabout's medical supplies, but Alixus forbids Sisko and O'Brien from attempting to contact the runabout. She tells them they will have to earn their keep by working in the field. While they work, a young man named Stephen is released from a metal box in which he was imprisoned for stealing a candle. That night, Alixus sends a colonist named Cassandra to attempt to seduce Sisko. When Sisko confronts Alixus, she assigns him to stand watch the rest of the night.

Meanwhile, DS9 officers Kira and Dax, searching for Sisko and O'Brien, discover their abandoned runabout traveling aimlessly, and attempt to retrace its course.

After Meg dies, Alixus accuses O'Brien of "defiling her memory" by trying to activate his technological devices. As his commanding officer, Sisko is placed in the punishment box. Once his punishment period is over, Alixus offers him water—if he will change out of his Starfleet uniform. Wordlessly, Sisko staggers back into the box.

O'Brien uses an improvised compass to locate the origin of the duonetic field, and discovers a generator buried beneath the sand. Vinod finds O'Brien and shoots at him with a bow, but O'Brien manages to outsmart him and brings him back to the village. O'Brien opens the punishment box with his now-functional phaser and reveals to the colonists that the field was artificially created. Alixus admits that she created the duonetic field, but she justifies her actions on the basis she believes they allowed the colonists who survived to discover their true potential.

When Kira and Dax arrive, Sisko and O'Brien assume the colonists want to come with them, but Joseph announces that the colonists have chosen to stay although they clearly have not been consulted. O'Brien and Sisko beam up to the runabout with Alixus and Vinod. After they leave, two young children stare wistfully at the point where the four vanished.

== Reception ==
Io9's 2014 listing of the top 100 Star Trek episodes placed "Paradise" as the 98th best episode of all series up to that time, out of over 700 episodes.

In 2015, Geek.com recommended this episode as "essential watching" for their abbreviated Star Trek: Deep Space Nine binge-watching guide.

== Releases ==
On April 1, 2003, Season 2 of Star Trek: Deep Space Nine was released on DVD video discs, with 26 episodes on seven discs.

This episode was released in 2017 on DVD with the complete series box set, which had 176 episodes on 48 discs.
