= Half-Life (film) =

2008 American movie by Jennifer Phang

- Directed by: Jennifer Phang
- Written by: Jennifer Phang
- Produced by: Alan T. Chan; Reuben Lim; Robert Zimmer Jr.
- Starring: Sanoe Lake; Leonardo Nam; Julia Nickson; Lee Marks; Ben Redgrave; Susan Ruttan; James Eckhouse; Alexander Agate
- Cinematography: Aasulv Wolf Austad
- Edited by: Gloria Vela; Harry Yoon; Kristian Hansen
- Music by: Michael S. Patterson
- Production companies: Fade to Blue Films; Mark E. Lee Productions; Lane Street Pictures
- Distributed by: Visit Films
- Release date: January 19, 2008 (Sundance Film Festival)
- Running time: 106 minutes
- Country: United States
- Language: English

Half-Life is a 2008 American science fiction drama film directed by Jennifer Phang, starring Sanoe Lake, Julia Nickson-Soul, Leonardo Nam, Ben Redgrave, Lee Marks, James Eckhouse, Susan Ruttan and Alexander Agate. The film premiered in the 2008 Sundance Film Festival and subsequently toured the American and international film festivals circuits. It premiered internationally in the Tokyo International Film Festival in competition, and then in Europe at the Mannheim-Heidelberg International Film Festival, also in competition. Half-Life was the opening night film for the International Women's Film Festival in Seoul, Korea. The film made a theatrical debut on December 1, 2009 in selected cities.

== Plot ==
Set in the near future amidst accelerating global cataclysms, the film follows a troubled young boy, Tim Wu (Agate), and his jaded older sister, Pam (Lake) as they use their imaginations (depicted as surreal animated sequences) to escape their broken lives after their airplane pilot father suddenly and unexpectedly abandons them. Their mother Saura (Nickson-Soul) struggles to make ends meet and move on with her life while involved with her manipulative boyfriend, Wendell (Redgrave). Pam, who works cleaning airplanes, seeks solace in her friend Scott (Nam), who struggles to be accepted as gay by his willfully ignorant, and staunchly Christian, adoptive parents (Eckhouse and Ruttan). Meanwhile, Tim's schoolteacher and Scott's lover, Jonah (Marks), attempts to reach out to Tim.

== Reception ==
Justin Chang gave the film a positive review in Variety, describing it as "a precocious if rather precious debut feature for writer-director Jennifer Phang", praising the film's computer generated effects and the representation of Tim and Pam's relationship through Aasulv Wolf Austad's cinematography, comparing it to the works of Apichatpong Weerasethakul. The Hollywood Reporter was similarly positive, criticizing the film as suffering from budget restraints, but praising Phang's depiction of the two households for capturing dark humor as well as "real pain and anguish", in addition to praising Alexander Agate's performance.

== Awards ==
The film has won the Gen Art Acura Grand Jury Prize 2008, the Asian American International Film Festival Best Feature Film Award, the San Francisco International Asian American Film Festival Best Narrative Feature Award, and the Visionary Award at Calgary's Fairy Tales International. It was also nominated for the Tokyo Grand Prix at the Tokyo International Film Festival.
