= Freya Adams =

American actress

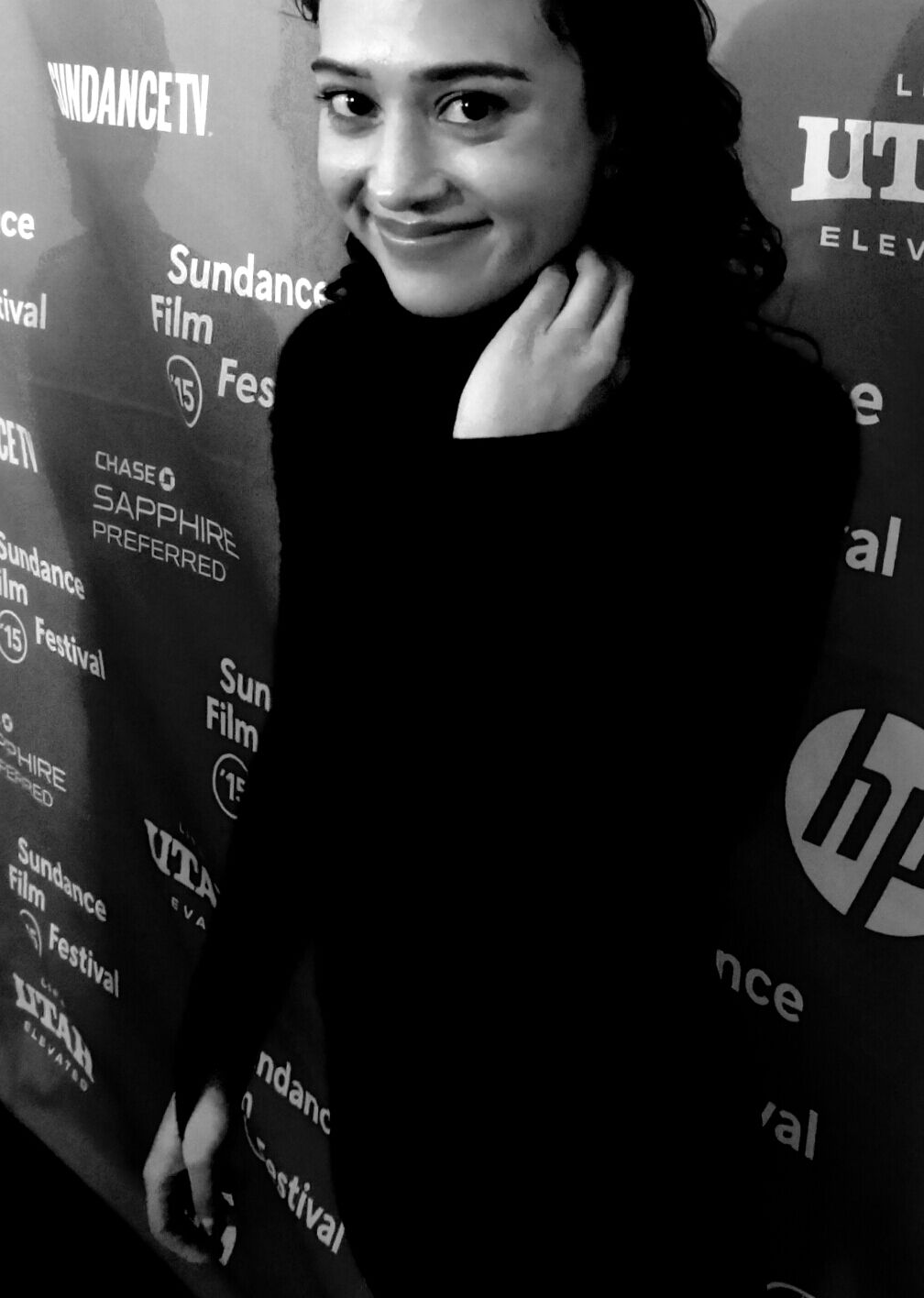
- Adams at the Sundance Film Festival
- Occupations: Actress, Producer, Writer
- Years active: 2002–present
- Website: https://pro.imdb.com/name/nm2633431/?ref_=tt_cst_1

Freya Adams is an actress, writer, and producer, best known for her role in the film Advantageous. She is also a Co-Founder of OREAD Entertainment. At Oread Entertainment, Freya works on developing new Film, TV, and Video Game projects.

== Career ==
Her first starring role was in Taste the Revolution, followed by a role in the Bollywood movie Kal Ho Naa Ho.

She consistently stars in television series, including,The Blacklist, The Rookie, and New Amsterdam, and has appeared in acclaimed short films such as Ayesha, Gloria, and Parallel. She was highlighted by IMDb as one of the ten rising actresses to watch, with her most notable performance in the independent drama Advantageous, which premiered at the Sundance Film Festival.

== Filmography ==
Year	Title	Role	Notes
2003	Making Revolution	Rose Laslow	
2003	Kal Ho Naa Ho	Neelam Puri	
2007	As the World Turns	Caroline	Episodes : 12952,12954
2008	New Amsterdam	Amartya Vikram	Episode: "Honor"
2014	The Blacklist	Sharon McManus	Episode: "The Front"
2015	Advantageous	Gwen 2.0	
2015	The Slap	Dania	Episode: "Anouk"
2016	The Woman in the Red Dress	Azalea	
2017	Ayesha	Ayesha	Short film
2018	Gloria	Stephany Powers	Short film
2020	Parallel	Brooke Elliot	Short film
2022	The Rookie	Tracy Urteaga	Episode: "The Choice"
2023	Yasuke: Descendents	Gail	
2024	Taste the Revolution	Rose Lachman	
