= The Hollywood Sign (film) =

2001 film by Sönke Wortmann

- Directed by: Sönke Wortmann
- Written by: Leon de Winter
- Produced by: Leon de Winter; Gerhard Meixner; Angela Roessel
- Starring: Tom Berenger; Rod Steiger; Burt Reynolds; Jacqueline Kim
- Cinematography: Wedigo von Schultzendorff
- Edited by: Edgar Burcksen
- Music by: Peter Wolf
- Distributed by: Indies Entertainment Group (NL)
- Release dates: September 28, 2001 (Netherlands Film Festival); October 4, 2001 (Netherlands)
- Running time: 90 minutes
- Countries: United States; Netherlands; Germany
- Language: English

The Hollywood Sign is a 2001 comedy/suspense drama film directed by Sönke Wortmann and written by Leon de Winter. It stars Tom Berenger, Rod Steiger and Burt Reynolds as three washed-up actors risking their lives to make a comeback, as well as Jacqueline Kim.

The screenplay is based on the book 'De hemel van Hollywood' by Leon de Winter.

== Plot ==
When three formerly top-tier, now has-been actors meet at the funeral of a legendary Hollywood agent, their alcoholic reunion leads them to visit the Hollywood Sign. There they find the body of a man – leading them to uncover an in-progress scam for stealing millions from a Las Vegas casino – which originated as a movie plot written by one of the actors' ex-girlfriends – who could not get her script produced. Desperate to make a comeback, the three risk their lives for production capital ... by writing themselves into the "script."

== Cast ==
- Tom Berenger as Tom Greener
- Jacqueline Kim as Paula Carver
- Rod Steiger as Floyd Benson
- Burt Reynolds as Kage Mulligan
- Al Sapienza as Rodney
- Dominic Keating as Steve
- Eric Bruskotter as Muscle
- David Proval as Charlie
- Kay E. Kuter as Robbie Kant
- Rafael Mauro as Lenny Lena
- Kathleen Gati as Deb
- Roz Witt as Deli Waitress
- Adria Tennor as Kant's Receptionist
- Amy Leland as Rocco Hostess
- Mark Gantt as Party Boy
- Garry Marshall as Director
- Mark Phinney as First AD
- Jeff Gardner as Camera Assistant
- Andy Milder as Studio Exec.
- Gregory Phelan as Studio Exec.
- Larry Wrentz as Second AD
- Theresa Hill as Wendy
- Whoopi Goldberg as Woman at funeral (uncredited)
- Alex Veadov as Cabbie
- Christian J. Fletcher as Kage's Son
