= Rolling (film) =

- Directed by: Billy Samoa Saleebey
- Written by: John Paul Cooney; Billy Samoa Saleebey; Cody Parrish Thompson
- Produced by: John Paul Cooney; Billy Samoa Saleebey; Cody Parrish Thompson
- Cinematography: Aaron Platt
- Edited by: Duncan Burns
- Release date: February 11, 2007
- Running time: 99 minutes
- Country: United States
- Language: English

Rolling is a 2007 independent drama film about a diverse group of characters who are linked by the drug MDMA ("ecstasy"). The faux documentary takes a tough yet entertaining realistic look at how this drug affects relationships and responsibilities. The film had its world premiere at the San Francisco Independent Film Festival on February 11, 2007. It is the directorial feature debut of Billy Samoa Saleebey.

== Cast ==
- Sanoe Lake (Rain)
- Garrett Brawith (Dustin)
- Rachel Hardisty (Summer)
- Joshua Harper (Josh)
- Clinton Cargile (Clinton)
- Erin Cummings (Lexa)
- Angie Greenup (Sarah Willis)
- Albert Rothman (Dan)
- Brian Toth (Matt)
- Calico Cooper (Jess)
- Christine Cowden (Samantha)
- Eric La Barr (Eric)

== Reception ==
A critic from Variety wrote that "Rolling may not live up to its billing as the first narrative feature to deal with Ecstasy usage, but it does strike an entertaining balance between boosterish 2000 indie Groove and the cautionary hysteria of direct-to-vid Rave".

== See also ==
- Recreational drug use
- Rave party
