= Troi Zee =

American actress and singer

Troi Zee (born November 9, 2002) is an American actress and singer best known for her role as Maya in the 2013 drama film 1982 and Amanda in the 2015 drama film Advantageous. Zee garnered recognition for voicing Anna in the Nickelodeon animated musical children's television series, Team Umizoomi in 2010.

== Biography ==
Zee began her acting career at The Children's Theatre Company in New York City. She began her career as a singer by launching her original music titled, "Brooklyn Girl".

== Filmography ==
=== Film ===
Year	Title	Role	Notes
2013	1982	Maya	
2015	Advantageous	Amanda	

=== Television ===
Year	Title	Role	Notes
2010	Team Umizoomi	Anna	2 episodes
