= Advantageous =

- Theatrical release poster
- Directed by: Jennifer Phang
- Written by: Jacqueline Kim; Jennifer Phang
- Produced by: Robert M. Chang; Ken Jeong; Jacqueline Kim; Moon Molson; Theresa Navarro
- Starring: Jacqueline Kim; James Urbaniak; Freya Adams; Ken Jeong; Jennifer Ehle; Samantha Kim
- Cinematography: Richard Wong
- Edited by: Sean Gillane; Jennifer Phang
- Music by: Timo Chen
- Production companies: Good Neighbors Media; D.K. Entertainment; I Ain't Playin' Films
- Distributed by: Netflix
- Release dates: January 26, 2015 (Sundance Film Festival); June 23, 2015 (United States)
- Running time: 90 minutes
- Country: United States
- Language: English

Advantageous is a 2015 American science fiction drama film starring Jacqueline Kim, James Urbaniak, Freya Adams, Ken Jeong, Jennifer Ehle, and Samantha Kim. The film was released exclusively on Netflix on June 23, 2015.

== Plot ==
Set in the near future, Gwen sells cosmetic procedures for the Center for Advanced Health and Living. Despite her relatively affluent position, she has difficulty sustaining a lifestyle that will ensure her daughter, Jules, a solid education and future. When she is abruptly fired from her job, Gwen's optimism quickly dissolves as she realizes that the only offer she has for employment is an egg donor position, due to women rapidly becoming infertile. The firing comes at a critical juncture in Gwen's life as she needs money to secure Jules's position at an elite school.

Feeling desperate, Gwen reaches out to her old employer, Fisher, to volunteer as one of the first subjects for a procedure that will transfer her consciousness into a new body, allowing her to keep her old job by becoming more youthful and racially ambiguous. Fisher assures her that if she agrees to the body transfer, the center will do everything it can to ensure Jules's future and protect Gwen as the face of the company. He also warns her that the procedure is still in its infancy; for a year, Gwen will have to take shots every two hours to help her breathe, otherwise she will face enduring pain. He explains that the technology is not finished yet and begs her to reconsider. Worrying that she will not be able to find another job at her age, Gwen decides to undergo the procedure.

Before agreeing to the procedure, Gwen tries one last desperate measure, reaching out to her cousin Lily and Lily's husband, Han, for help. Gwen and Han had an affair about 14 years ago, and, though Lily had forgiven the affair, her attitude changes once she learns that Gwen has a child fathered by Han. She tells Gwen they need more time to think about helping her, especially considering the suddenness of the news, but Gwen tells them that she has no time. Lily says she and her husband need time to think about helping financially, especially since they have children of their own.

Gwen breaks the news of her procedure to Jules, who seems to be understanding of the circumstances. Together, they go to see Gwen's future body. After spending Christmas with Jules, Gwen completes the procedure and returns home in a new body, Gwen 2.0. Gwen 2.0 is unrecognizable and carries none of Gwen's distinguishing physical traits. Post-procedure, Gwen 2.0 is disoriented and in pain, but she does her work for the center well. Jules, who had been warned that her mother might be slightly different, takes care of her and administers her shots when she has difficulty breathing. However, Gwen 2.0 has trouble understanding and relating to Jules after the procedure. She tells Fisher she wants to separate from Jules, believing that Jules can take care of herself and would prefer being alone. Fisher is furious and reveals to Gwen 2.0 that she is not Gwen, but a twin that had been implanted with Gwen's memories; he explains the twin process to her because he thinks it will be easier for the twin Gwen to merge with the donor's memories by learning the truth. Gwen's original consciousness died during the procedure, but she was willing to go through with it to ensure her daughter's future. Gwen 2.0 is unaffected by the news and tells Fisher the part of Gwen that loved Jules did not transfer. When she returns home, she tells Jules that her mother is dead. Jules, in response to the news, initially hides the shot Gwen 2.0 needs to breathe but eventually gives it to her. When Jules tells Gwen 2.0 she is not sure why she kept her alive, Gwen 2.0 reassures her that her kindness is unique to her. Jules tells her she sounds like her mother.

Gwen 2.0 later sees a message from Lily and Han in which they apologize for their initial dismissal and tell her that they would like to help her and Jules. Gwen 2.0 goes to their home and breaks the news about Gwen to them. Later, she organizes a picnic so that Jules can meet Han, Lily, and their boys for the first time.

== Cast and characters ==
- Jacqueline Kim as Gwen Koh
- James Urbaniak as Dave Fisher
- Freya Adams as Gwen 2.0
- Ken Jeong as Han
- Jennifer Ehle as Isa Cryer
- Samantha Kim as Jules
- Troi Zee as Amanda
- Olivia Horton as Sarai
- Jennifer Ikeda as Lily
- Mercedes Griffeth as Ginger
- Sameerah Luqmaan-Harri as Winnie
- Theresa Navarro as Olivia
- Jeanne Sakata as Soon Yang
- Matthew Kim as Ken
- Rebecca Summers as Appealing Spokesperson
- Ariana Altman as The Masked Girl
- Oscar Ariete as The Quiet Room Attendant

== Production ==
=== Pre-production ===
Advantageous in its feature form debuted at Sundance 2015. The foundation of the film was originally shot by Phang and Kim as a 23-minute short film, with ITVS for Futurestates. Phang directed and co-wrote the film as well as received a shared editing credit. Kim began as the star of the short film until Phang asked her to co-write the short into a feature. Pre-production lasted about a year while Kim and Phang took turns writing the short. Most of the cast members returned from the short. The film was influenced by The Age of Innocence, Mad Men, Battlestar Galactica, and Ghost in the Shell. Phang was connected with most of her VFX artists from her previous film Half Life, released in 2008. Phang wanted to create a city that was not recognizable, so filming took place in New York City, Los Angeles, and San Francisco.

=== Filming ===
Filming began in 2012 in New York City when Phang was making Advantageous as a short. The foundation grew throughout 2013-2014, when filming locations were expanded to Los Angeles and San Francisco. The film was released as a feature in 2015.

== Soundtrack ==
Song list

- 1. Opening 3:31
- 2. I Like It 0:30
- 3. Les Femmes 1:33
- 4. Center for Advanced Health and Living 1:46
- 5. Both 0:36
- 6. Cryer Building 1:18
- 7. You've Been Pursued 1:50
- 8. Drake 2:00
- 9. Let's Get You Something to Eat 0:49
- 10. Luncheon 2:06
- 11. Asians 0:49
- 12. End Call 0:34
- 13. Jar 0:45
- 14. Photos 2:34
- 15. Gwen Signs 3:56
- 16. The Quiet Rooms 2:02
- 17. The Experience 6:30
- 18. Tunnel 0:34
- 19. What Happened 0:41
- 20. Pier 4:06
- 21. Jules Plots 0:31
- 22. Becoming Gwen 1:42
- 23. Becoming Jules 1:34

== Release ==
The film premiered at the Sundance Film Festival on January 26, 2015. The film was released exclusively on Netflix on June 23, 2015.

== Reception ==
On the review aggregator website Rotten Tomatoes, 86% of 21 critics' reviews are positive, with an average rating of 6.7/10. The website's consensus reads: "Advantageous transcends obvious budgetary limitations to pose thought-provoking questions about gender roles and family dynamics." Metacritic rated it 59/100 based on nine reviews. Dennis Harvey of Variety called it a "thinking person's sci-fi tale" whose methodical pacing eventually slows down to a near-crawl. Leslie Felperin wrote, "Perhaps the perfect film for geeky women's studies majors, this is bursting with interesting ideas and details but has some significant flaws". Manohla Dargis of The New York Times wrote, "It's a kick to see how effectively Ms. Phang has created the future on a shoestring even if she hasn't yet figured out how to turn all her smart ideas into a fully realized feature." G. Allen Johnson of the San Francisco Chronicle rated it 3/4 stars and wrote that "the last half hour is so irresistibly creepy that it's sure to invoke discussion after the screening".

Alan Scherstuhl of The Village Voice wrote that the film "demands we consider just how much beauty-minded societies demand of women". Because of its unconventional structure, Scherstuhl says it is likely to alienate viewers who are looking for a traditional story. Kevin P. Sullivan of Entertainment Weekly rated it C and called it a "missed opportunity". Mike D'Angelo of The Dissolve rated it 3/5 stars and wrote that despite the feature film adaptation's filler, fans of intelligent science fiction may be interested. Diego Costa of Slant Magazine rated it 1.5/4 stars and wrote, "Advantageous's visual effects are sophisticated for a low-budget film, and the acting is pleasantly realistic, but filmmaker Jennifer Phang portrays this very near future like a universe of such quietness and sterility that it's difficult to care about its inhabitants."

Advantageous creators Jennifer Phang and Jacqueline Kim won a Sundance Special Jury Award for Collaborative Vision, and the film was nominated for the John Cassavetes Award at the 31st Independent Spirit Awards.

== Awards ==
Advantageous won editing, score, and directing awards at the Los Angeles Asian Pacific Film Festival in 2015. The lead, Jacqueline Kim, also won a Renaissance Artist award for co-writing and starring in the feature.
