= White Tiger (1996 film) =

1996 film by Richard Martin

- Directed by: Richard Martin
- Written by: Don Woodman Gordon Melbourne Roy Sallows Bey Logan (story)
- Produced by: Robert Vince; William Vince; Roy McAree (executive); Michael Strange (executive)
- Starring: Gary Daniels Julia Nickson Matt Craven Cary-Hiroyuki Tagawa Lisa Langlois
- Cinematography: Gregory Middleton
- Edited by: Kerry Uchida
- Music by: Graeme Coleman
- Production companies: Keystone Entertainment; Den Pictures
- Distributed by: Malofilm (Canada); Evergreen Entertainment (U.S.)
- Release dates: May 28, 1996 (Canada; U.S.)
- Running time: 93 minutes
- Country: Canada
- Language: English
- Budget: US$2.3–2.5 million

White Tiger is a 1996 Canadian action film directed by Richard Martin, starring Gary Daniels, Julia Nickson, Cary-Hiroyuki Tagawa, George Cheung and Lisa Langlois. Daniels stars as a disenfranchised DEA agent looking to eliminate the triad boss (Tagawa) responsible for the death of his partner, while succumbing to the charms of a mysterious woman (Nickson) who may be a killer herself.

== Plot ==
DEA agents Mike Ryan and John Grogan are summoned to Seattle to take part in a raid targeting triad boss Victor Chow. The squad stakes out the rendezvous point between Chow and an associate of his named Tang. Chow introduces Tang to a revolutionary drug he created, but things turn sour between the two factions and a gunfight erupts. Ryan and Grogan have to intervene, but Chow gets a hold of Grogan and uses him as a human shield to protect his escape, before killing him once he has reached his motorboat.

Ryan is discharged from the case by his superiors, but decides to track down Chow on his own. Back in Hong Kong, rival crime bosses decide to put a hit on Chow, who has become too big and reckless for their taste. Ryan visits a night club owned by Chow, and meets a mysterious woman named Jade, who seems well informed about the kingpin. Mike is also contacted by Detective Fong, a former acquaintance of his, who objects to his intrusion in his jurisdiction. But despite their friendship, Fong's allegiances may not be what they seem.

== Cast ==
- Gary Daniels as Mike Ryan
- Julia Nickson as Jade
- Cary-Hiroyuki Tagawa as Victor Chow
- George Cheung as Det. Fong
- Lisa Langlois as Joanne Grogan
- Ron Yuan as Severin
- Dana Lee as Zhou
- Philip Granger as Capt. McGuire
- Matt Craven as John Grogan
- J. Max Kirishima as Tang
- John Kirkconnell as Josh Grogan
- Ben Ratner as Cordero

== Production ==
=== Original production ===
White Tiger started filming in Hong Kong under the name Tiger Storm. The film was then produced by East West Pictures, a company created by British expatriate martial artist Mark Houghton and local businessman Ed Maher, both of whom had made a number of tough guy appearances in local films. Houghton reached out to fellow Briton and former student, Impact magazine writer Bey Logan. The latter relocated to Hong Kong to work on the film, writing the screenplay and helping with sales. That early version included notable martial arts actors who did not make it into the final film, such as British kickboxer Winston Ellis, Hong Kong-based Australian Kim Maree Penn and, in her film debut, Mark Houghton's daughter Charlene. Ellis reported that he had recently returned home from filming in an early May 1994 interview. However, about one third of the way in, the inexperienced producers had run out of money, causing filming to be suspended and a falling out with Logan.

=== Rebooted version ===
Robert Vince of Canadian company Keystone Entertainment bought out the embattled investors. Thanks to Daniels' appeal and a sizzle reel made from the original footage, he managed to raise enough money for an entirely new shoot. While some actors from the first version were apparently left under the impression that filming might resume with them, it was found more practical to discard all of the Hong Kong material and redo the movie from scratch, keeping the outline of Logan's script. As it had previously done in the past, KeyStone partnered with Den Pictures, the California-based company founded by Japanese expatriate J. Max Kirishima (who has a minor role in the film). The new version had a budget of US$2.3 to 2.5 million. It was during an unrelated trip to the American Film Market that Logan found out that the film—then still called Tiger Storm—was being finished. He walked up to the producers' booth and complained that he had not been paid for his story, one of the few things remaining from its original incarnation. He was immediately cut a check for his services.

The rebooted film started shooting in June 1995, and spanned several locales across British Columbia, Canada. Daniels choreographed the fight sequences himself. The villain's main henchman was played by Ron Yuan, whom he asked the production to bring over from Los Angeles, as the two had remained friends following their first experience working together on Ring of Fire. The actor deemed the cast and crew, as well as the overall shoot, to have been one of the most agreeable of his career.

==== SS Prince George ====
Villain Victor Chow's lair was located aboard the SS Prince George, a passenger ship turned floating hotel docked in Britannia Beach while waiting to be sold. Although spectacular, the fiery explosions rocking the deck during the film's finale were not meant to damage its structure, and the ship remained afloat in the shoot's immediate aftermath. However, in October 1995 two fires broke out onboard, badly damaging the Prince George, which started listing. Oil leaks and asbestos dust also threatened local environment. Possible lingering effects from the film shoot were considered by investigators. It was verified that the producers possessed proper fire insurance, and the company's experts demanded to examine the ship. The coast guard's investigation ultimately could not assign blame for the fires. The ship was sold for scraps, but sank near the Aleutian Islands in October 1996, while en route to the Chinese steel mill where it was to be dismantled.

== Release ==
=== Home media ===
The film was released on VHS tape in Canada and the U.S. on May 28, 1996. It was distributed by Malofilm in Canada, and Evergreen Entertainment in the U.S. The film was also released on LaserDisc by disc-based media specialists Image Entertainment on June 19, 1996. In Japan, the film was released on VHS on October 18, 1996, by M's Pictures.

== Reception ==
While a favorite of Daniels' and his fanbase, the film was poorly received by the mainstream press, with particular criticism for the star's performance. The Edmonton Journal dismissed the film as "a hackneyed array of high kicks, flying fists and exploding cars". TV Guide was not impressed either, finding it "tediously stretched out with endless slow-motion shots of shootouts and explosions." The magazine added that while "Daniels might be capable in the martial arts", he suffered from a "bland personality" and "somnambulistic acting", concluding that "[a]s with most films of this type, more imagination has gone into the stunts than the script." British reference book Elliot's Guide to Home Entertainment was no more enthusiastic, writing that it "ha[d] nothing original to offer " and was "not exactly helped by a weak and lifeless performance from Daniels".

The BBC's Radio Times was more amenable to the film as a whole, calling it "an efficient crime thriller", but it, too, found fault with Daniels' performance, writing that he "lacks the charisma to carry the action between the fight sequences." In his book The American Martial Arts Film, M. Ray Lott gave a rare positive opinion of the actor's dramatic performance, writing that White Tiger "features all of Daniels’ strengths, both as an actor and a martial artist", praising his attempts at emotion and levity in separate scenes of the movie.

== Cancelled sequel ==
According to Daniels, the film was commercially successful, and a sequel was considered. Ultimately, it did not happen, and the actor has acknowledged that he deserved some of the blame for the project's stalling.
