= Jacqueline Kim =

American actor and filmmaker

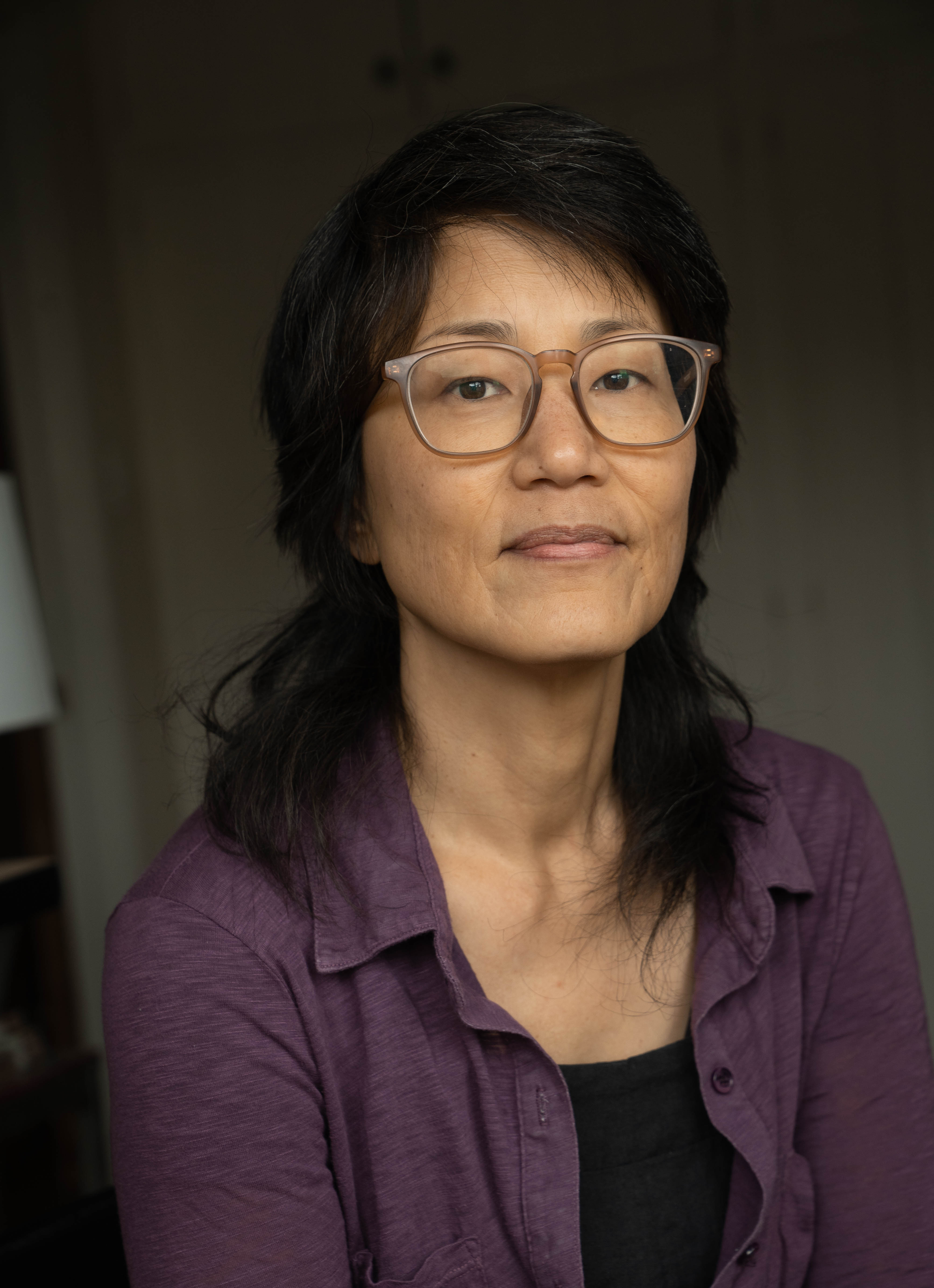
- Born: Jacqueline Joan Kim; Cincinnati, Ohio, U.S.

Jacqueline Joan Kim is an American writer, actress, filmmaker, composer and multi-disciplinary artist. She was nominated for a FIND Independent Spirit award for Best Supporting Actress in the film Charlotte Sometimes.

== Early life ==
Kim was born in March 31, 1970, in Cincinnati, Ohio, to Korean parents, as the youngest of three girls. She was raised in Bloomfield Hills, Michigan, and started in theatre at age 4, "at a little theatre down the street called 'Willow Way'." She graduated from Bloomfield Hills Lahser High School in 1988. She then earned a Bachelor of Fine Arts from the Theatre School at DePaul University in Chicago.

== Career ==
After graduating from drama school, Kim began acting on stages in Chicago, The Shakespeare Theatre (DC) and eventually landed in Minneapolis. Highlights throughout four seasons at the Guthrie Theater include such roles as Nina in The Seagull, the title role in Electra and Phocion/Princess in The Triumph of Love.

At the end of 1993, she moved to Los Angeles and began her film career, landing major roles in two films, Star Trek Generations and Barry Levinson's Disclosure. These roles were followed by work opposite Tommy Lee Jones in Volcano. In 1999, she played Yon Greene, a Bangkok attorney and lawyer for Claire Danes and Kate Beckinsale, in Brokedown Palace. In 2001, she shared the title role in the film The Operator, written and directed by Jon Dichter, co-starring Michael Laurence and Stephen Tobolowsky. Her breakout film and performance was in Eric Byler's Charlotte Sometimes, which film critic Roger Ebert championed and brought to his Overlooked Film Festival. This role was recognized by two FIND Independent Spirit Award nominations for Kim's work as Charlotte and for the film (the John Cassavetes Award).

Kim is also known for her work in the two part epic "The Debt, Part I and II" for the Xena: Warrior Princess television series as Xena's spiritual mentor, Lao Ma. She won the 2004 LA Drama Critics' Circle award for best female lead performance in East West Players' production of Passion. At the 22nd San Francisco International Asian American Film Festival (SFIAAFF), Kim was a panelist at the "Dangerous to Know: The Career and Legacy of Anna May Wong" event. She was joined by actress Nancy Kwan, and authors Karen J. Leong and Graham Russell Gao Hodges. The panel discussion was moderated by critic B. Ruby Rich.

Her roots are in musical theatre. In 2011, she released her first EP, This I Heard (song & melodies, part I).

In 2015, Kim finished production on the film Advantageous. She co-wrote, produced and composed the feature with its director, Jennifer Phang, while starring opposite Jennifer Ehle, James Urbaniak and Ken Jeong.

== Filmography ==
Year	Title	Role	Notes
1992	The Mighty Ducks	Jane	
1993	Trauma	Alice	
1994	Disclosure	Cindy Chang	
1994	Star Trek Generations	Ensign Demora Sulu	
1994	White Mile	Michelle Stefanoff	Television
1995	Courthouse	Amy Chen	Television; 6 episodes
1997	Volcano	Jaye Calder	
1997	Xena: Warrior Princess	Lao Ma	Television; Episodes: "The Debt, Part I" and "The Debt, Part II"
1999	Brokedown Palace	Yon Greene	
2000	The Operator	The Operator	
2000	ER	Linda Reed	Television; Episode: "The Greatest of Gifts"
2001	The Hollywood Sign	Paula Carver	
2001	The West Wing	Lt. Emily Lowenbrau	Television; Episode: "Bad Moon Rising"
2002	Charlotte Sometimes	Charlotte/Darcy	Independent Spirit Award nominee for Best Supporting Female
2002	In Search of Cezanne	Martha Beck	Credited as co-writer
2005	Red Doors	Samantha Wong	
2006	Present		Writer, director and producer
2006	Threshold	Rachel	Television; Episodes: "Outbreak" and "Vigilante"
2015	Advantageous	Gwen	Writer and producer
