= Taste the Revolution =

- Theatrical release poster
- Directed by: Daniel Klein
- Written by: Daniel Klein; Brandon Krueger; Colin Trevorrow
- Produced by: Seth Cohen; David Linke; Kevin Linke; Maury Loeb; Josh Roth
- Starring: Mahershala Ali; Drew Cortese; Clay Allen; Jeremy Dubin; Freya Adams; Jeremy Beiler; Lindsay Garric
- Cinematography: Matthew Deetsch
- Edited by: David Linke; Kevin Linke; Maury Loeb
- Music by: Brandon Krueger
- Production companies: Forest Street Films; The Gravity Collaborative
- Release date: October 19, 2024 (New Orleans Film Festival)
- Running time: 86 minutes
- Country: United States
- Language: English

Taste the Revolution (originally titled Making Revolution) is a 2024 American mockumentary comedy-drama film directed by Daniel Klein and co-written by Klein, Brandon Krueger, and Colin Trevorrow. It stars Mahershala Ali, Drew Cortese, Clay Allen, Jeremy Dubin, Freya Adams, Jeremy Beiler, and Lindsay Garric. The film was originally shot in 2001.

Taste the Revolution premiered at the New Orleans Film Festival on October 19, 2024.

== Premise ==
Charismatic, revolutionary Mac Laslow (Ali) and a group of disillusioned college students, came together to form a "World Summit" to counter the apathy of a privileged generation.

== Cast ==
- Mahershala Ali as Mac Laslow
- Drew Cortese as Jacob Mathias
- Clay Allen as Mervyn Sweet
- Jeremy Dubin as Elliot Friedman
- Freya Adams as Rose Lachman
- Jeremy Beiler as Alistair McCormick
- Lindsay Garric as Tracy Johnson

== Production ==
In October 2024, it was reported that mockumentary comedy-drama film titled Taste the Revolution would get released 23 years after it was filmed in 2001, by director Daniel Klein, who co-wrote the screenplay with Brandon Krueger and Colin Trevorrow. The film was shelved after the September 11 attacks. The footage was unearthed and re-edited, with new footage shot in 2024. Mahershala Ali, Drew Cortese, Clay Allen, and Jeremy Dubin were part of the original cast, with Freya Adams, Jeremy Beiler, and Lindsay Garric joining the new version in 2024. The film is currently seeking distribution.

== Release ==
Taste the Revolution premiered at the New Orleans Film Festival on October 19, 2024.
