= Julia Nickson =

British-Chinese film actress

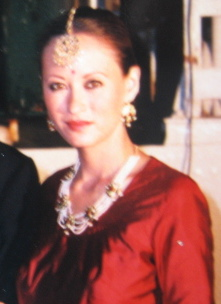
- Nickson on the set of Around the World in 80 Days (1989)
- Other name: Julia Nickson-Soul
- Occupation: Actress
- Years active: 1982–2025
- Spouse: David Soul (m. 1987; div. 1993)
- Children: China Soul

Julia Nickson is a film actress. She first came to the attention of worldwide audiences in the 1985 action film Rambo: First Blood Part II, starring Sylvester Stallone. She also appeared in the 2004 film Ethan Mao and in the 2008 independent film Half-Life.

== Early years ==
Nickson is the daughter of a British father and a Chinese mother. After her father's death in an automobile accident when she was six, Nickson and her mother had to live in a house with three other families. Her grandmother often watched Chinese operas on television, and that kindled Nickson's interest in performing.

When she was 17, Nickson left Singapore to study at the University of Hawaiʻi. Her successful audition for a play while she was there led to a shift in interest from business administration to drama. After two years, she left the university to work as a model, study acting, and perform in community theater productions.

== Career ==
While attending the University of Hawaiʻi, Nickson was a model in Honolulu, where she appeared in her first play, The Winter's Tale. After acting classes, community theater, and roles on Magnum, P.I., she appeared as the female lead in Rambo: First Blood Part II (1985). She appeared with Chuck Norris in Sidekicks (1992).

Her other film appearances have included roles in Glitch! (1988), China Cry (1991), K2 (1992), Double Dragon (1994), White Tiger (1996), Devil in the Flesh (1998), Ethan Mao (2004), Half-Life (2008), Dim Sum Funeral (2008), and One Kine Day (2011).

Nickson guest starred in the final episode of seaQuest 2032 as Lieutenant Commander Heiko Kimura, a role that would have been a main character had the series continued, and in two Star Trek series: The Next Generation episode "The Arsenal of Freedom" as Enterprise-D crewmember Ensign Lian T'su, and the Deep Space Nine episode "Paradise" as Cassandra, a villager who attempts to seduce Commander Benjamin Sisko. She played Catherine Sakai, Commander Jeffrey Sinclair's love-interest, in the first season of Babylon 5.

She had a recurring role as Dr. Susan Lee on the television series Walker, Texas Ranger (reuniting her with Chuck Norris), and as Princess Aouda in the 1989 miniseries version of Around the World in 80 Days opposite Pierce Brosnan and Eric Idle. She had a supporting role in the television version of the novel Noble House, again opposite Brosnan.

Julia retired from acting for personal reasons on March 29, 2025

== Personal life ==
Nickson was married to actor/singer David Soul. They have one daughter, China Soul, a singer/songwriter.

She was a practising Scientologist, having joined the Church of Scientology in 1996. She credited the organization with helping to improve her health.

== Filmography ==
=== Film ===
Year	Title	Role	Notes
1985	Rambo: First Blood Part II	Agent Co Phuong Bao	
1987	Reincarnation	Julia	
1988	Glitch!	Michelle Wong	
1988	Chiari di luna	Yumi	
1990	China Cry	Sung Neng Yee	
1991	K2	Cindy	
1992	Sidekicks	Noreen Chan	
1993	Amityville: A New Generation	Suki	Direct-to-video
1993	Bei mei		
1994	Double Dragon	Satori Imada	
1996	White Tiger	Jade	
1998	Devil in the Flesh	Anna Nakashi	Direct-to-video
1999	Life Tastes Good	The Woman	
2004	Skin Trade	The Lady Ping	Short film
2004	Ethan Mao	Sarah Mao	
2005	Final Approach	Hanna Reitsch	Direct-to-video
2007	Blizhniy Boy: The Ultimate Fighter	Detective	Uncredited
2008	Half-Life	Saura Wu	
2008	Dim Sum Funeral	Elizabeth	
2008	Lost Warrior: Left Behind	Police Sergeant	Direct-to-video
2011	One Kine Day	Suzie	
2016	Beyond the Game	Police Sergeant	
2016	The Unbidden	Kat	
2018	Ready Player One	JN / Commuter	Uncredited

=== Television ===
Year	Title	Role	Notes
1982–1983	Magnum, P.I.	Carla / Lani	2 episodes
1985	Airwolf	Minh Van McBride	Episode: "Half-Pint"
1987	Harry's Hong Kong	Mei Ling	Television film
1987	Crime Story	Lizard Woman	Episode: "Love Hurts"
1988	Noble House	Orlanda Ramos	Television miniseries
1988	Star Trek: The Next Generation	Ensign Lian T'Su	Episode: "The Arsenal of Freedom"
1989	Around the World in 80 Days	Princess Aouda	Television miniseries
1989	Man Against the Mob: The Chinatown Murders	Kaylie	Television film
1990	The Girl Who Came Between Them	Nhung	Television film
1991	Silverfox	Shimoi Chen	Television film
1992	The Fifth Corner		5 episodes
1993	Kung Fu: The Legend Continues	Connie	Episode: "Illusion"
1993	Dark Justice		2 episodes
1993	South of Sunset	Jade	Episode: "Custody"
1994	Star Trek: Deep Space Nine	Cassandra	Episode: "Paradise"
1994	Babylon 5	Catherine Sakai	3 episodes
1994–1995	One West Waikiki	Laura Greystone	2 episodes
1995	Chicago Hope	Leigh Sun	Episode: "A Coupla Stiffs"
1995	The Marshal	Lilly Chin	Episode: "Love Is Strange"
1996	SeaQuest 2032	Lieutenant Commander Heiko Kimura	Episode: "Weapons of War"
1996–1998	Walker, Texas Ranger	Dr. Susan Lee	3 episodes
1999	The Wild Thornberrys	Malay Wallah / Kid / Malay Woman / Wallah (voice)	2 episodes
1999	L.A. Heat	Qiu Donnolly	Episode: "Little Saigon"
1999	The Young and the Restless	Ellen	Episode: #1.6629
1999–2001	Nash Bridges	Mindy / Denise Minato	2 episodes
2000	JAG	Lynne Kennedy	Episode: "JAG TV"
2001	The Wild Thornberrys: The Origin of Donnie	Villager / Forest Animal / Donnie's Mother (voice)	Television film
2001	Love Bytes	Rambo	
2002	The Division	Jasmine	Episode: "Brave New World"
2002	Power Rangers Wild Force	Mrs. Enrile	Episode: "A Father's Footsteps"
2003	Days of Our Lives	Real Estate Agent	Episode: #1.9543
2008	Family Man	Janet Loveland	Television film
2009	Castle	Mrs. Lee	Episode: "Hedge Fund Homeboys"
2010	Seven Days	Anita	Television film
2010	Rex Is Not Your Lawyer	Judge Lauren Arvale	Episode: "Pilot"
2016	Girlfriends' Guide to Divorce		Episode: "Rule #14: No Means... No"
