= The Alternate (Star Trek: Deep Space Nine) =

- Star Trek: Deep Space Nine episode
- Episode no.: Season 2 Episode 12
- Directed by: David Carson
- Story by: Jim Trombetta; Bill Dial
- Teleplay by: Bill Dial
- Production code: 432
- Original air date: January 10, 1994

Guest appearances
- James Sloyan as Dr. Mora Pol; Matt McKenzie as Dr. Weld Ram

Episode chronology
← Previous "Rivals"	Next → "Armageddon Game"
- Star Trek: Deep Space Nine season 2

"The Alternate" is the 32nd episode of the American science fiction television series Star Trek: Deep Space Nine. It is the 12th episode of the second season. It premiered on January 10, 1994.

Set in the 24th century, the series follows the adventures on Deep Space Nine, a space station located near a stable wormhole between the Alpha and Gamma quadrants of the Milky Way Galaxy, in orbit of the planet Bajor. In this episode, Odo's former teacher believes he has found a life form similar to Odo in the Gamma Quadrant. The episode introduces James Sloyan as Dr. Mora Pol, the Bajoran scientist who studied the Odo life-form after he was discovered.

== Plot ==
Dr. Mora Pol, the Bajoran scientist who studied Odo when he was first discovered, arrives on Deep Space Nine and tells Odo that he has picked up DNA signatures similar to Odo's on a planet in the Gamma Quadrant. Mora, Odo, Dax, and Mora's assistant depart for the planet in a runabout to investigate. While en route, Mora's fatherly attitude toward Odo, including embarrassing stories from their early time together, irritate him. Commander Sisko attempts to relate with and console Odo by telling him about a time he was helpless to aid his father in need.

Upon reaching the planet, the four of them beam to the surface, where they discover a tiny life form that may be a distant relative of Odo. Before they can return to the runabout, however, an earthquake releases volcanic gases into the air. The other three pass out, but Odo, unaffected because he does not have a respiratory system, beams them back to the runabout.

Back on the station, Dax and the others are brought to the infirmary to recover, while the life form is brought to the science lab, where O'Brien tries unsuccessfully to identify it. As it appears to be growing, he puts it into a containment field, but later that night, the crew finds the lab damaged, and the life form gone, apparently having escaped through an air duct. They note that the incident was accompanied by a power drain and a rise in temperature. O'Brien, attempting to track the creature down, hears a strange noise, and then finds a puddle of goo, which they assume is the life form's remains.

Bashir is studying the remains in the infirmary when he is attacked by a strange creature, which he fends off with a laser scalpel. Dax's analysis of a sample reveals the DNA of the life form and the creature are different, and she begins a computer search for a match with known life forms. Mora, meanwhile, recognizes the DNA pattern as Odo's and confronts him privately. He points out that the attacks occurred approximately sixteen hours apart, exactly the times when Odo reverts to his natural gelatinous state to regenerate. They surmise that the gas on the Gamma Quadrant planet might have affected Odo somehow. Panicking, Odo begins to head for the infirmary, but Mora claims Bashir will not understand and will treat Odo like a monster. He presses Odo to come back to Bajor with him, and, as he does so, the increasingly agitated Odo again transforms into the creature.

Security picks up a power drain in Odo's office, but, when they arrive to investigate, they find nothing amiss. Having seen Odo's violent reaction to him, Mora explains to Commander Sisko and Major Kira that he is the cause of Odo's metamorphosis. The first time, he explains, the creature was trying to rescue the organism Mora had contained in the science lab; the second time, it appeared in the infirmary, where Mora was a patient; and the third time, Odo and Mora were in the middle of a heated debate. He helps the crew lure Odo in his altered state to the Promenade, where he is contained in a force field and reverts to normal.

Later, the effects of the gas having been removed, Odo apologizes to Mora for attacking him. Mora apologizes to Odo for ignoring his feelings; he finally realizes what he had done when Odo had felt like a prisoner in his laboratory. Mora says he would like to be a part, however small, of Odo's life, and the two begin to reconcile.

== Reception ==
In IGN's review of season 2, they said this and "Shadowplay" were "good Odo episodes" in this season.

== Releases ==
It was released on LaserDisc in Japan on June 6, 1997, as part of the half season collection 2nd Season Vol. 1, which had 7 doubled sided 12" discs. The discs had English and Japanese audio tracks.

On April 1, 2003, Season 2 of Star Trek: Deep Space Nine was released on DVD video discs, with 26 episodes on seven discs.

This episode was released in 2017 on DVD with the complete series box set, which had 176 episodes on 48 discs.
