= China Cry =

1990 film by James F. Collier

- Directed by: James F. Collier
- Screenplay by: James F. Collier
- Based on: China Cry by Nora Lam and Irene Burk Harrell
- Produced by: Don L. Parker
- Starring: Julia Nickson-Soul; France Nuyen; James Shigeta
- Cinematography: David Worth
- Edited by: Duane Hartzell, Ruby Yang
- Music by: Joel Hirschhorn, Al Kasha; "No One But You" performed by Irene Cara
- Production companies: Parakletus, TBN Films
- Distributed by: Penland Productions
- Release date: 2 November 1990 (USA)
- Running time: 101 minutes
- Country: USA
- Language: English
- Box office: US$4,212,828

China Cry is a 1990 American biographical film set during rise of the communist state in China, based on the book by Nora Lam.

It is set in the 1950s based on the true story of Sung Neng Yee (played by Julia Nickson-Soul), and also stars Russell Wong.

Born into a wealthy Chinese family, Nora is first eager to become part of Mao Zedong's "new society". But the Maoist regime brings hardship and misery to her family. She is arrested by authorities, and she believes that only the Lord Jesus Christ must have saved her when she miraculously survives a firing squad whilst being condemned as a Committed Christian from a Christian Intellectual family (by a Northern Chinese State Security Woman Officer- after she urges her to kiss the Red Flag).

She is then taken to a labour camp while pregnant, but once again, survives to take her children and family to freedom, which is finally granted after she sends (from the Labour Camp in Shanghai) three copies of the same telegram: one to Chairman Mao; and the other two to Prime Minister Chu & Beijing Police Headquarters.

The film was directed by James F. Collier (who also directed The Hiding Place and Joni), and is an example of positive Asian characters in a Christian-themed film.

The film's theme song "No One But You" is performed by Irene Cara.

== Box office ==
The Los Angeles Times reported in 1991 that despite mostly "downbeat" reviews it did not stop China Cry from grossing over $4 million since its release in the previous autumn.

== Critical reception ==
Los Angeles Times, "In style and tone it's old-fashioned, melodramatic and occasionally ponderous, but it is also marked by the solid craftsmanship, unmistakable commitment and genuine spirituality typical of the work of its capable writer-director James F. Collier, long associated with Billy Graham’s now-defunct World Wide Pictures."

The New York Times, ""China Cry" would like to be the Asian-American answer to "Ben Hur" but the tale is told too choppily to gather much momentum, and the acting is tentative."
