= Sanoe Lake =

American actress, model, surfer

- Born: Kauai, Hawaii, U.S.
- Occupations: Actress; model; surfer
- Years active: 2002–present
- Known for: Blue Crush
- Notable work: Surfer Girl, A Guide To The Surfing Life

Sànoe Lake is an American actress, model and surfer.

== Personal life ==
Lake was born and raised on Kauai, Hawaii. She is of Hawaiian, Japanese and English descent. Her name "Sànoe" means "The Mist." Lake was 15 years old when she was discovered by a manager on the beach of Oahu's North Shore after coming in from surfing. Soon after, she began working internationally as a model. At 18 Lake moved to Hollywood, California. Lake had a successful career working as a professional model outside of the action sports industry; however, she became dissatisfied with the modeling industry stating that it often felt "shallow and empty." Lake began acting at 21 years old.

== Career ==
=== Modeling ===
At 16 years old, Lake was the face used to launch the brand Roxy. The early Roxy campaigns that featured Sanoe Lake were shot by the New York fashion photographer Dewy Nicks. The campaigns are credited for helping to create a new genre within the surfing industry for females by broadening their representation outside of competitive surfing.

Lake was one of the first female surfers to come out of the surfing industry and cross over into mainstream media. She became known as the "Princess of Surf" throughout the surfing industry due to her multidimensional career. She has been featured on the cover of dozens of magazines and has been featured in various commercials worldwide. Some of the television commercial campaigns Lake was featured in were Target, Mastercard, Gap, Volkswagen, Eddie Bauer and MTV. Some of the magazines Lake was featured in were Elle, Vogue, Vanity Fair, W, Cosmopolitan, Variety, Sports Illustrated, Seventeen, People, Shape and Teen magazine. Lake also authored the book, Surfer Girl

From 2003 to 2013 Sanoe was contracted to surf and to be a face of Billabong Girls. During the decade Lake was contracted with Billabong she was featured in numerous international print campaigns and commercials for the company. During her final year's with Billabong Lake became the ambassador of Design For Humanity. Design for Humanity is an art-fashion-music showcase held at Paramount Studios in Hollywood, California. The block party festival features music, fashion shows, live art auctions and organic food trucks to raise funds for nonprofit organizations that are linked to the surfing community. Lake went on international missions trips to work directly with the nonprofit organizations Design For Humanity donated to.

=== Author ===
In 2005 Lake wrote the book Surfer Girl, A Guide To The Surfing Life. The book offers a comprehensive guide to surfing, along with thoughtful chapters on equipment, basic safety and techniques, as well as helpful mental and physical training. The book was published by Little Brown and Company

=== Acting ===
Lake is most recognized for her role in the 2002 cult classic movie Blue Crush. Lake was nominated along with co-stars Kate Bosworth and Michelle Rodriguez for an MTV Movie Award for the category of "Best On Screen Team." She also starred in the music videos "Stella" (1999 version) by Jam & Spoon and "If I Could Fall in Love" by Lenny Kravitz (2003). She went on to play the role of Rain in Rolling in 2007. She played Gina in the 2008 film Creature of Darkness, which was released in 2010. She had a leading role in the 2008 film Half-Life The film was debuted at the Sundance Film Festival and won the Gen Arts International film festival award.

=== Business ===
In 2016 Lake and her husband opened the restaurant Tropicali in Big Bear Lake, California. It was at one time the highest ranked restaurant in California and the highest ranked Poke restaurant in the United States by Yelp.

== Filmography ==
Film
Year	Title	Role
2002	Blue Crush	Lena
2005	Cruel World	Ruby
2007	Rolling	Rain
2008	Half-Life	Pamela Wu
2010	Creature of Darkness	Gina
