= Susan Ruttan =

American actress

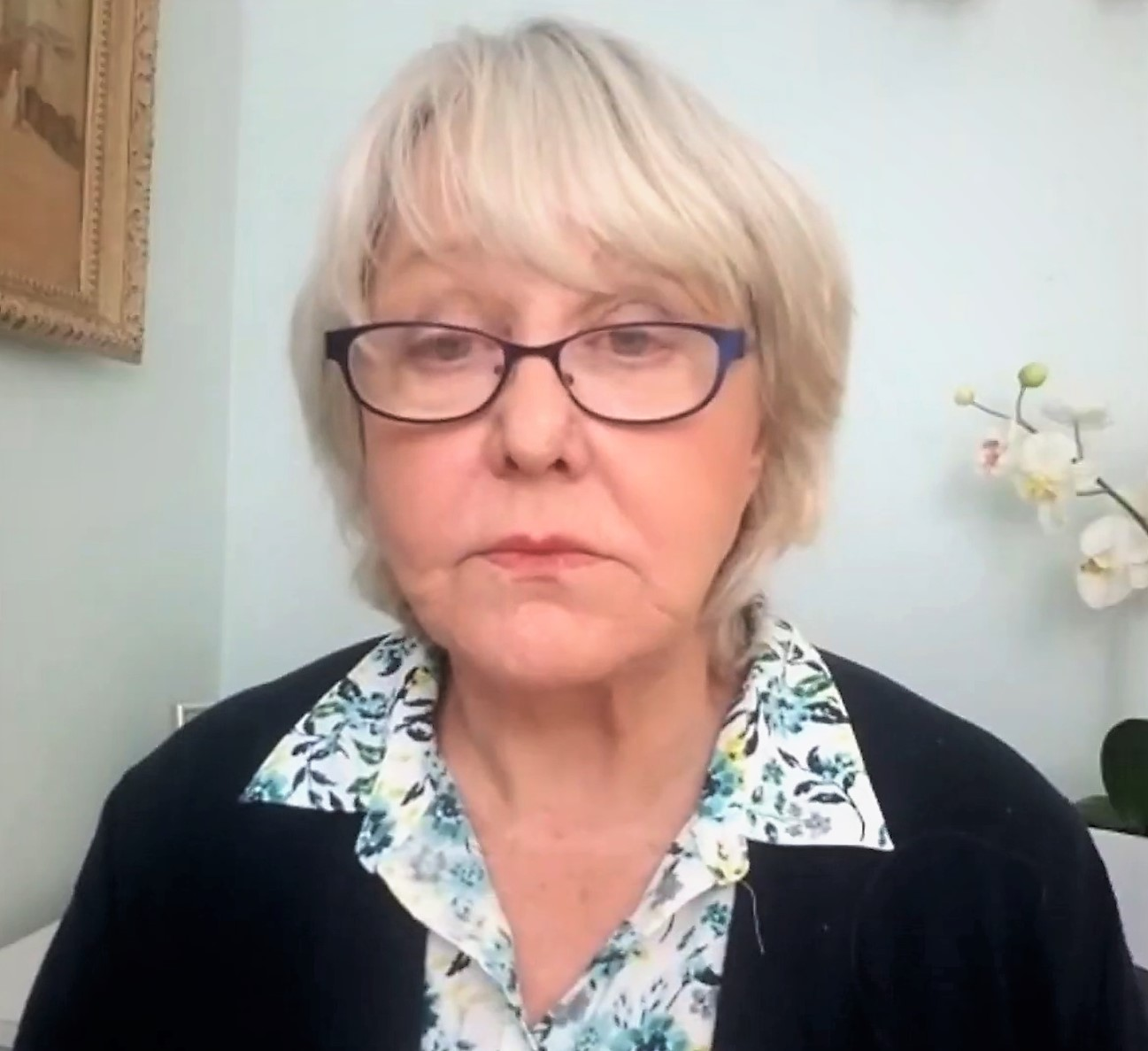
- Ruttan in Common Census short film, 2020
- Born: Susan Diane Dunrud; September 16, 1948 (age 77)
- Occupation: Actress
- Years active: 1981–present

Susan Diane Ruttan (née Dunrud; born September 16, 1948) is an American actress. She is best known for her role as Roxanne Melman on L.A. Law (1986–1993), for which she was nominated four times for a Primetime Emmy Award, twice for a Golden Globe Award, and four times for a Viewers for Quality Television Award, winning once in 1989.

== Early years ==
A native of Oregon City, Oregon, Ruttan is an Oregon logger's daughter, born Susan Diane Dunrud on September 16, 1948, Her mother worked for a hospital, and she has a brother, Her education included five years at a boarding school. She graduated from University of Oregon and University of California, Santa Cruz.

== Career ==
Before Ruttan found success in acting she worked in casting at Universal Studios.

Ruttan played Roxanne Melman on L.A. Law from 1986 to 1993. She reprised the role in 2002 for a TV reunion, L.A. Law: The Movie. She earned four nominations for Primetime Emmy Award for Outstanding Supporting Actress in a Drama Series for her performance in show.

Ruttan first attracted significant attention playing the scheming wife of George Jefferson's dry-cleaning archrival, Gil Cunningham, on The Jeffersons. Other television appearances included episodes of Buffy the Vampire Slayer, AfterMASH, Bosom Buddies, 3rd Rock from the Sun, Remington Steele, Yes, Dear, Newhart and Gilmore Girls. Buffy creator Joss Whedon cast numerous show alumni in 2008's Dr. Horrible's Sing-Along Blog, including Ruttan who appeared briefly in a non-speaking role.

Ruttan had a small comedic role in the teen comedy feature film Bad Manners (aka: Growing Pains) (1984), and the 1990 romantic comedy Funny About Love starring Gene Wilder. She played convicted killer Genene Jones in the television movie Deadly Medicine (1991). She has also appeared in an episode of Hannah Montana ("Promma Mia"). Her most dramatic role to date was in the 2004 remake of Helter Skelter, in which she played the mother of Linda Kasabian. In 2009, she appeared in the movie Prayers for Bobby.

== Personal life ==
Ruttan was married to Mel Ruttan Jr. when she was 18 years old and widowed when she was 22.

== Filmography ==
=== Film ===
Year	Title	Role	Notes
1988	Bad Dreams	Miriam	
1990	Funny About Love	Claire	
1998	Krippendorf's Tribe	Mrs. O'Brian	
1998	Love Kills	Lela	
2004	The Sure Hand of God	Lucy Trotter	
2008	Half-Life	Lorraine Parker	
2009	Donna on Demand	Rose	
2009	Dead Air	Maggie	
2014	The Quota	Lucy	Short
2015	Come Simi	Jeannie	
2025	The Addiction of Hope	Dr. Winter	
2026	House Cat	Mrs. Myerson	Short

=== Television ===
Year	Title	Role	Notes
1981	Bosom Buddies	Esther Crane	"What Price Glory?"
1981	Quincy, M.E.	Helen	"Sugar and Spice"
1983	Amanda's	Sister Mary Elizabeth	"Oh, Promise Me"
1983	Packin' It In	Mrs. Estep	TV film
1983	After George	Marge	TV short
1983	AfterMASH	Doris Gardena	"September of '53/Together Again"
1984	Second Sight: A Love Story	Robin	TV film
1984	Buffalo Bill	Katherine Zawicki Shub	"A Hero", "Have Yourself a Very Degrading Christmas"
1984	Benson	Rita	"The Scandal"
1984	Remington Steele	Miss Livermore	"Lofty Steele"
1984	Scorned and Swindled	Margie	TV film
1984	Newhart	Sarah	"Georgie's Girl"
1985	Kicks	Rosemary	TV film
1985	The Jeffersons	Mrs. Cunningham	"That Blasted Cunningham"
1985	Do You Remember Love	Julie Myers	TV film
1985	What's Happening Now!!	Jane	"A Horse Is Not a Home"
1985	Murder: By Reason of Insanity	Judge M. Tyson	TV film
1985	Night Court	Mrs. Blake	"Wheels of Justice: Part 1"
1986	Under the Influence	Ms. Morgan	TV film
1986	The New Leave It to Beaver	Mrs. Livermore	"Heavy Metal", "A Day in Mayfield"
1986	The $25,000 Pyramid	Herself	5 episodes airing December 22, 1986 to December 26, 1986
1986	The $100,000 Pyramid	Herself	5 episodes airing November 17, 1986 to November 21, 1986
1986–1993	L.A. Law	Roxanne Melman	Main role
1987	Bay Cove	Debbi McGwin	TV film
1987	The New Hollywood Squares	Herself	5 episodes airing June 8, 1987 to June 12, 1987
1987	The $25,000 Pyramid	Herself	10 episodes airing April 6, 1987 to April 10, 1987 and October 26, 1987 to October 30, 1987
1987	The $100,000 Pyramid	Herself	5 episodes airing June 1, 1987 to June 5, 1987
1987	Super Password	Herself	5 episodes airing May 27-29 and June 1-2, 1987
1988	Take My Daughters, Please	Courtney	TV film
1988	The New Hollywood Squares	Herself	20 episodes airing February 22 to February 26, 1988; June 13 to June 17, 1988; October 10 to October 14, 1988; and November 7 to November 11, 1988
1988	The $25,000 Pyramid	Herself	5 episodes airing May 16, 1988 to May 20, 1988
1988	The $100,000 Pyramid	Herself	5 episodes airing February 8, 1988 to February 12, 1988
1988	Super Password	Herself	5 episodes airing April 25 to April 29, 1988
1989	Fire and Rain	Sandra Thompson	TV film
1989	The New Hollywood Squares	Herself	5 episodes airing May 8 to May 12, 1989
1990	CBS Schoolbreak Special	Ms. Morales	"Malcolm Takes a Shot"
1990	A Quiet Little Neighborhood, a Perfect Little Murder	Judy Hecker	TV film
1990	Sweet 15	Mrs. Zavala	TV film
1991	A Triumph of the Heart: The Ricky Bell Story	Carol Blankenship	TV film
1991	Deadly Medicine	Genene Jones	TV film
1991	The $100,000 Pyramid	Herself	Episodes airing January 28, 1991 to February 1, 1991 and November 18, 1991 to November 22, 1991
1992–1996	Jack Reed	Arlene Reed	TV films
1993	Without Warning: Terror in the Towers	Anne Marie Tesoriero	TV film
1993	The Mommies	Anne	"Much I Do About Nothing"
1994	Touched by an Angel	Joanne Peters	"Cassie's Choice"
1995	Sweet Justice	Marilyn Craig	"Pledges"
1995	Courthouse	Stefanie Dale	"Mitigating Circumstances"
1995	Family Values	Melody Huck	TV film
1996–1997	Chicago Hope	Linda Fortin	"Higher Powers", "Verdicts"
1997	Touched By Evil	Madge Jaynes	TV film
1997–1998	Suddenly Susan	Nectarine Stites	"It's My Nana and I'll Cry If I Want To", "Oh, How They Danced: Parts 1 "1 & 2"
1998	Life of the Party: The Pamela Harriman Story	Janet	TV film
1998	The Love Boat: The Next Wave	Doris Werner	"All Aboard"
1999	3rd Rock from the Sun	Cathy	"Citizen Solomon"
2000	Gideon's Crossing	Dr. Grace Tarpon	"The Lottery"
2000	The Ultimate Christmas Present	Mrs. Claus	TV film
2000	Popular	Joy Ferrara	"Citizen Shame", "Ur-ine Trouble", "Are You There God? It's Me Ann-Margret"
2001	Judging Amy	Lyla Myles	"Romeo and Juliet Must Die – Well, Maybe Just Juliet"
2001	Gilmore Girls	Bed & Breakfast Wife	"The Road Trip to Harvard"
2001	Any Day Now	Marietta Pryor	"Blinded by the White"
2001	Yes, Dear	Aunt Betty	"Guess Who's Not Coming to Dinner"
2002	Buffy the Vampire Slayer	Doris Kroeger	"Gone"
2002	Maybe It's Me	Mrs. Finn	"The Crazy-Girl Episode"
2002	L.A. Law: The Movie	Roxanne Melman	TV film
2002	The Agency	Mrs. Barnes	"Home Grown"
2004	The Division	Mrs. Evans	"Book of Memories"
2004	Helter Skelter	Mrs. Kasabian	TV film
2004	CSI: NY	Mrs. Moreland	"American Dreamers"
2005	Strong Medicine	Dr. Offenbach	"Differentials"
2005	Monk	Mrs. Ledsky	"Mr. Monk and Little Monk"
2005	Boston Legal	Jeanie Biddle	"Truly, Madly, Deeply"
2006	The Legend of Butch & Sundance	Mrs. Place	TV film
2009	Prayers for Bobby	Betty Lambert	TV film
2009	Private Practice	Nora	"Nothing to Fear"
2009	Ghost Whisperer	Mrs. Blakelock	"Thrilled to Death"
2009	Castle	Mrs. Pike	"Ghosts"
2009	Hannah Montana	Grandma	"Promma Mia"
2009	Hawthorne	Dolores Kramer	"Yielding"
2009–2010	The Forgotten	Horsemama	"Railroad Jane", "Patient John"
2011	Grey's Anatomy	Mrs. Swork	"Disarm"
2013	Good Luck Charlie	Mrs. Dobbs	"Futuredrama", "Weekend in Vegas"
2015	Battle Creek	Carole	"Heirlooms"
2015	I Didn't Do It	Ada	"The Bite Club"
2015	Grimm	Betty Frame	"Clear and Wesen Danger"
2018	American Vandal	Patricia McClain	Netflix Series
2018	Mom	Lucy	3 episodes
2018	9-1-1	"Dosed"	
2019	Weird City	Linda Maxsome	"The One"
2020	Bob Hearts Abishola	Mrs. Clark	"On a Dead Guy's Bench"
2021	Shameless	Nurse Nun	"Cancelled"
2022	The Good Doctor	Patient	"Hot and Bothered"
2024	A Man on the Inside	Gladys Montrose	Recurring role
