= Chaplin's Circus =

UK touring circus

- Type: Limited company
- Industry: Circus / Theatre
- Founded: 2012
- Founder: Gary Stocker; Mark Foot
- Headquarters: Cambridge, England, United Kingdom
- Area served: United Kingdom
- Website: http://www.chaplinscircus.com/

Chaplin's Circus is a touring U.K. circus, established in 2012 by Gary Stocker and Mark Foot. It is a narrative-driven performance which incorporates both pantomime with traditional circus skills and tells the story of a 1920s circus "on the brink of bankruptcy that is saved by an inventor who builds the world's first human cannon". Chaplin's Circus features neither animals nor clowns.

== Gary Stocker ==
Gary Stocker is a co-founder of Chaplin's Circus. At the age of 15, he began performing a comedy magic street show in Covent Garden, London. In 2002, he went on to read law at St John's College, Oxford. Stocker worked as a legal recruitment consultant and legal researcher before giving it up to found Chaplin's Circus. A Member of The Magic Circle, Stocker also performs in the show as "The Great Hermann", the circus magician who is fired from The Human Cannon.

== Mark Foot ==
Mark Foot is a co-founder of Chaplin's Circus. He worked as a street performer in Covent Garden, London, which is where he first met Stocker. At the age of 22, Foot set up events company Hocus Pocus, "providing seasonal entertainment in approximately 75% of the shopping centres across the UK. He is a Director of Scarenation Ltd., a scare attraction which is currently in its third year of trading. Foot also performs in the show as the Ringmaster.

== Tours ==
Chaplin's Circus premiered on 24 May 2014, in Highfield Park, St Albans.
