= Nora Lam =

Chinese-American evangelist

Nora (Neng Yee) Lam
- Born: 4 September 1932; Beijing, China
- Died: 2 February 2004 (aged 71); San Jose, California, United States
- Education: Huatung Political Science & Law College
- Spouses: Cheng Shen Lam, S.K. Sung
- Parent(s): Dr. & Mrs. H.T. Sung

Nora Lam (September 4, 1932 – February 2, 2004) was a Chinese Protestant Christian minister to China, and founder of Nora Lam Ministries International (NLMI). Lam was born in China and lived there until her escape to Hong Kong at age 26.

== Early life ==
Nora Lam was born September 4, 1932, in a missionary hospital in Peking (now Beijing, China). Abandoned at birth, she was adopted six months later by Dr. and Mrs. H.T. Sung, a prominent couple in Shanghai. Both her adoptive parents were members of a wealthy elite in the Republic of China. Her paternal grandfather, Sung Han-Chang, was a well-known banker and financier involved with the Bank of China in Shanghai. Her maternal great-grandfather, Ye Hongying (葉鴻英) was also a well known industrialist, entrepreneur, and philanthropist in the late-Qing and Republican Shanghai. Her adoptive father was born September 11, 1900, and was educated in Lyon, France, where he was trained as a physician. Little is known about Lam's early life apart from the accounts in her own published memoirs: "For Those Tears," coauthored with Cliff Dudley, and "China Cry" coauthored with Irene Burk Harrell. Lam, then still known as Sung Neng Yee (宋能爾), recounts growing up as a member of a privileged elite. She attended the McTyier primary school in Shanghai for six years. After the Japanese occupation of Shanghai in 1939, Sung and her family fled their home to live at her step-grandmother's home in Shanghai's French Concession. In 1941, she attended the McTyeire Home and School for Girls, where she first heard of Christianity. During her time there, Sung writes about her vision of a guardian angel, appearing in the form of an old man, who continually advised her throughout her life.

In 1942, at age ten, her family fled the Japanese again, this time to her grandfather's home in Chongqing, Chiang Kai-shek's war time capital in southwest China. There, she attended an American missionary boarding school, and recounts an interesting detail where she befriended the daughter of Christian warlord Feng Yuxiang.

== Return to Shanghai ==
After the war ended in 1945, the Sung family returned to Shanghai. Her father began practicing medicine again at the Huantou Textile Hospital, and Sung was enrolled in the academically prestigious Mary Farnham School, a boarding school for girls run by Presbyterian missionaries. Influenced by many of her classmates, Sung professed to be a Christian on the eve of her middle school entrance exam. By age 16, however, she had stopped professing to be a Christian.

The period surrounding the Communist takeover of China was an uncertain one. Sung in fact left China briefly, planning to live with her aunt in Taiwan. However, the impoverished living conditions in Taiwan prompted her to return to the mainland after ten days.

Following the end of the Chinese Civil War in 1949, she enrolled at Huatung Political Science & Law College in Suzhou with aspirations of becoming a lawyer. She graduated third in her class in 1953 and became an assistant professor teaching law and history. She met and fell in love with Cheng Shen Lam, another law student at the university. In 1955, realizing that she was pregnant, she and Lam were married. Their son was born later that year.

== Life after the Communist takeover ==
Lam's biographies emphasize the rupturing nature of the Communist revolution, and tell a story of intensifying persecution due to her family's wealth, western connections, and Christianity. Particularly significant in Lam's narrative is the theme of suffering and resistance to persecution under the new Communist state. Due to her parents' wealth and western training and to her own experiences with foreign missionaries, Neng Yee was interrogated by Communist party officials, who wanted to break her of any bourgeois tendencies. As she was questioned, she began to question herself, realizing that she still believed in Christianity. In her autobiography, China Cry, Neng Yee claimed she was sentenced to death by firing squad but somehow survived.

In 1957, her husband, whose parents lived in Hong Kong, was also interrogated by officials as part of the first Anti-Rightist Movement. During this time, Neng Yee gave birth to her second child, Ruth Lam Kendrick. One month later, Neng Yee's father, who had previously lost his job and had been forced into reeducation through labor, died from experimental drugs that officials tested on him. In 1958, just as Mao Zedong's Great Leap Forward was beginning, Cheng Shen was able to obtain an exit visa to Hong Kong to visit his ailing father. He took daughter Ruth with him. Neng Yee, acting as a guarantor for his return, was forced to undergo hard labor despite being pregnant with their third child. After petitioning Beijing, she was granted an exit visa to visit Hong Kong during her maternity leave. Her mother's escape to Hong Kong followed two years later.

== Life in Hong Kong ==
After reaching Hong Kong in 1958, the couple's third child was born. The Rev. Paul Kauffman served as their pastor in Hong Kong, but the couple soon had marital difficulties. Sung Neng Yee, now known as Nora Lam, claimed spousal abuse, divorced her husband, and was remarried to S. K. Sung, an elder at the church. Lam's life in Hong Kong has been the subject of intense scrutiny and controversy, especially in light of an investigation conducted in the 1980s by California attorney John Stewart. Whereas Lam's account in "China Cry" emphasizes her victimization and suffering of physical abuse by her spouse, Stewart's investigation found that Lam and S.K. Sung fabricated the case in order to legitimize their re-marriage to conservative evangelical audiences.

== Life in the United States ==
The US Immigration and Nationality Act of 1965 significantly reduced immigration quotas and gave Nora the chance to immigrate to the United States. With a sponsorship from American evangelist Kathryn Kuhlman, with whom she was acquainted during Kuhlman's visit to Hong Kong, Nora was able to immigrate to the U.S. with her children, mother, and first husband Cheng Shen, in 1966. She became a naturalized U.S. citizen.

== Transnational life as an evangelist and miracle healer ==
Although the latter part of Lam's life was based predominantly in the United States, her greatest legacy was arguably in the evangelistic tours she conducted in Asia. Since the 1970s, she traveled annually to Taiwan, conducting evangelistic tours, miracle healing services, preaching widely. While her biographies recount that the tours to Taiwan were a result of coincidences, or divine providence, her own personal connections also proved essential. Her mother was a personal acquaintance of the first lady, Soong May-Ling, and Soong, together with the wife of vice-president Yen Chia-Kan, both attended and supported Lam's first ever evangelistic tour to Taiwan. At the same time, her husband S.K. Sung was also well-connected in Pentecostal Christian circles in East Asia, having served as the chairman of the Hong Kong chapter of the Full Gospel Businessman's Association. S.K. Sung, and his close affinity with General Samuel Wu Sung-Ching, possibly also provided Lam networks into the Guomindang Christian Anti-Communist elite.

In the early 1970s, Lam's evangelistic rallies were among the large-scale public crusades which conducted miracle healing, and evangelistic outreach specifically targeting children. Like other large-scale evangelistic meetings of the time, such as Billy Graham's five days of crusades in 1975, Chou Lien-Hwa's preaching tours across Taiwan, Lam was able to amass huge crowds . However, unlike many others, Lam's claims to fame lay largely on the power of her personal testimony, and her purported ability to heal the sick.

In 1974, Lam founded Nora Lam Ministries International in San Jose, California, and began bringing American missionary/tourists with her, on her annual missionary crusades to Asia. Crowds as large as 100,000 were in attendance at her evening crusades in Taiwan. In 1976, she famously led the televangelist Pat Robertson, and Ralph Wilkerson of California's Melodyland Christian Center to Taiwan, where they all received a Cultural Award from education minister Jiang Yizhi, in recognition of their contributions to US-Taiwan cultural exchange. Lam also played a central role in negotiating a partnership between CBN and Taiwan's China National Television, where she hosted an evangelistic television program on divine healing, during the 1970s and 1980s. Lam received the Korean Association of Social Work Award, a medal from the Pacific Cultural Foundation, an award from the Overseas Chinese Affairs Commission, and a special award from Sung Ro Won Children's Home in Korea, along with the respect of national leaders.

Lam and her second husband adopted two children from Taiwan.

== Later career ==
In December 1990, Lam's story made American national headlines with the release of the film "China Cry." It was produced by the California televangelist Paul Crouch and his Trinity Broadcasting Network (TBN). While the national news media focused on the seminal event of TBN's first foray into filmmaking, it brought the "Nora Lam story" to mainstream American theaters. As film critic Jin Yang argued, the metanarrative of suffering and redemption fit with anti-communist Cold War story about American need and ability to "rescue" the Chinese. In that regard, "China Cry" fulfilled expectations and stereotypes about religious "persecution" under communism, and the heroic victory of the free/capitalist world.

However, the film's release prompted greater scrutiny of Lam's private life, and a series of reportage in the mainstream and evangelical press, which noted that national organizations like the Assemblies of God, and the National Association of evangelicals, had denied her membership. Whilst Lam and her defenders critiqued that White missionaries were jealous of her "success," critiques focused intense attention on the circumstances of her divorce. Interestingly, most of the criticisms came from scrutiny of her divorce and re-marriage, rather than the claims of miracle healing and bodily resistance. Nevertheless, an accusation was made against Lam in the television documentary "American Gospel: Christ Alone" that at a miraculous healing meeting she avoided a teenager named Justin Peters who had an obvious disability, being cerebral palsy. When approached by his father, she asked about the family's financial situation on the basis that the more money you give to the Lord's work the more likely he is to answer your prayers.

The decline of Lam's ministry was also shaped by the changing nature of anti-communist politics of Taiwan. The end of martial law in Taiwan in 1987, and decline in influence of anti-communist Guomindang Christian leaders whom Lam could rely on for support, no doubt hastened the end of her career as evangelist in Asia.

== Death ==
She died in California on February 2, 2004. She was survived by two sons, three daughters and seven grandchildren. Her oldest daughter Ruth Lam Kendrick is president of Nora Lam Ministries International, now renamed World Children's Fund, which continues to support Chinese house churches, Christian orphanages and children's programs around the world.

== Book authored ==
- China Cry: The True Story of Nora Lam (1990)
- For Those Tears (1972)
