= List of Upsala College people =

This is a list of the people associated of Upsala College including the school's presidents, its faculty and alumni. Upsala College was a Lutheran-affiliated, private college located in East Orange, New Jersey (1899–1995). After years of declining enrollment and financial problems, Upsala College closed in May 1995.

== Presidents of Upsala College ==
Nine men have served as the president of Upsala College in its 102-year history. Most of them were Lutheran clergymen. Only one, the Rev. Dr. Evald Benjamin Lawson (1904–1965), was an alumnus of Upsala College.

	Portrait	President	Years in office	Education	Notes
1	—	Rev. Lars Herman Beck (1859–1935)	1893–1910	B.A., Augustana College (1885); attended Augustana Theological Seminary (1885–87); Ph.D., Yale University (1892)	Chosen to be the first president by the Augustana Synod at its annual meeting.; October 1893, met with first 16 students in a Brooklyn, New York church basement.; School offered land in Kenilworth, New Jersey in 1898, Upsala became a four-year degree-granting college in 1903—graduating its first students with B.A. degrees in 1905.
2	—	Rev. Peter Froeberg (1873–1954)	1910–1920	B.A., Augustana College (1898); B.D. Augustana Theological Seminary (1902); attended Yale University, 1900–1905	Often borrowed money in his own name to pay the college's debts, including securing a large mortgage from Scandia Life Insurance Company to pay the entire debt and end foreclosure proceedings.
3	—	Rev. Carl Gustav Erickson (1877–1936)	1920–1936	B.A., Augustana College (1904); B.D., Augustana Theological Seminary (1908)	Reorganized the curriculum and faculty, Student body increased from 300 to 1,500 during his tenure.; Raised $465,000 to develop the school including 1923 purchase of 45-acre campus in East Orange, New Jersey.
4	—	Rev. Evald Benjamin Lawson (1904–1965)	1938–1965	B.A., Upsala College; B.D. Augustana Theological Seminary; Studied at Union Theological Seminary; M.A. Biblical Seminary (1933); S.T.D., Biblical Seminary (1937)	Expanded the college's East Orange campus; new buildings were built including the Beck Hall, residence halls, library and chapel.
5	—	Rev. Carl Gustaf Fjellman (1919–2011)	1966–1976	B.A., Augustana College (1941); B.D., Augustana Theological Seminary (1945); attended University of California, Berkeley; Ph.D., Drew University (1955)	Oversaw completion of Puder Hall for the sciences (1968), College Center (1970), Art Center (1971), and townhouse complex.; Changing demographics made multiculturalism, integration and diversity key issues.
6	—	Rodney Otto Felder (1927–1997)	1976–1984	B.A., State University of New York at Albany (1949); M.A., Columbia University (1953); Ed.D., Columbia University (1957)	Expanded school by acquiring the Wirths Campus in Wantage Township, Sussex County, New Jersey.; Previously a teacher and administrator in public school system and taught at various colleges.; Last president of Finch College in New York City (1970–77).
7	—	David Eugene Schramm (1936–2021)	1986–1988	B.A. Concordia College (1958); M.Div., Concordia Seminary (1961); Ph.D. Washington University in St. Louis (1971)	Brief presidency saw declining enrollment.; Resigned over "differences of opinion as to how the college could best achieve its goal while preserving its mission" with the trustees.
8	—	Rev. Robert Edgar Karsten (1930–2014)	1988–1994	B.A., Augustana College (1952); M.Div., Lutheran School of Theology at Chicago (1956); Ph.D., University of Denver (1972)	Attempted to stem tide of serious financial problems, declining enrollment and academic standards, brought in international students.
9	—	Paul Victor DeLomba (1935–2018)	1994–1995		Partner and project manager with Price Waterhouse, DeLomba was hired in 1994 by the board of trustees to close the college.

== Faculty and staff ==
=== Academic faculty ===
- Käthe Bauer-Mengelberg, economist and sociologist; professor of sociology after emigrating from Nazi Germany
- Richard Toensing, composer and music educator
- J. E. Wallace Wallin, visiting psychology professor, psychologist, early proponent of education for the mentally handicapped

=== Athletic staff ===
- Ron Rothstein, professional NBA basketball coach, former college basketball player, former teacher and basketball coach (1974–1975)

== Alumni ==
This list of alumni includes both those who completed degree programs and graduated from Upsala College, as well as those who attended but did not graduate.

=== Academia and research ===
Name	Degree (year)	Description
Joan W. Bennett	B.S. 1963	geneticist
John Langston Gwaltney	B.A. 1952	anthropology professor
Birger A. Pearson	B.A. 1957	early Christianity and Gnosticism scholar; professor emeritus of religious studies at University of California, Santa Barbara, University of California, Berkeley

=== Politics and public service ===
Name	Degree (year)	Description
Betty Boyd		former Colorado state legislator
David Demarest		political operative, White House communications director (Reagan, Bush administrations); Stanford University administrator
Frank J. Dodd		New Jersey Senate president; New Jersey Casino Control Commission member; businessman
Brian Fischer	B.S. 1966	Commissioner of the New York State Department of Correctional Services
Nia Gill	B.A. 1971	New Jersey state senator
Don Guardian	B.A. 1975	New Jersey assemblyman
Donald Jacobs	B.S. 1987	Chief information officer, Bucks County, PA; real estate investor and developer; Fire Marshal, Lehigh County, PA; former private sector CIO and executive CIO consultant; former New Jersey politician, fire commissioner & emergency management director - Sussex County; BS - Mathematics conc: Natural Science, Edison State University, 1989; M.Div studies - New Brunswick Theological Seminary, 1993; MBA - Southern New Hampshire University, 2017
Hymen B. Mintz (1909–1986)	A.B. 1929	New Jersey General Assembly from 1954 to 1957
Matthew Patrick		Massachusetts state representative
Richie Roberts	did not graduate	former New Jersey police detective and defense attorney; most recognized because of his role in the arrest, prosecution and later defense of Harlem drug lord Frank Lucas. Roberts was portrayed by Russell Crowe in the film American Gangster.
Harold J. Wirths (born 1965)	A.S.	Member of the New Jersey General Assembly since 2018, representing the 24th Legislative District; Served as commissioner of the New Jersey Department of Labor and Workforce Development (2010–2016)

=== Arts and entertainment ===
Name	Degree (year)	Description
Louis Chu		Asian-American author, Eat a Bowl of Tea
Richie Davis		Canadian Football League player and Grey Cup champion
Kay Gardella		New York Daily News television critic
Walt Housman		football player
Don Kirshner		songwriter, rock music producer
Allen Klein	B.S. 1956	music industry executive, talent manager, and pioneer in freeform radio
Dick Kryhoski		Major League Baseball first baseman, 1949 World Series with New York Yankees
Mike Largey (born 1960)		basketball player in the Israeli Basketball Premier League
Bob McCann	did not graduate	professional basketball player
Robert W. Peterson		newspaper reporter and author
Jerry Recco	did not graduate	radio personality (WFAN, WHTG, WINS)
Gunārs Saliņš		Latvian modernist poet
Vin Scelsa		radio personality, created Idiot's Delight freeform radio program
Sally M. Walker	B.A. 1975	juvenile science and nonfiction author

== Fictional alumni ==
- The protagonist of Philip Roth's novel American Pastoral (1997), Seymour "Swede" Levov, and his wife, Dawn Levov, are graduates of Upsala.
