= Jason Adams =

Jason Adams may refer to:

- Jason Leland Adams (born 1963), American actor and theater director
- Jason William Adams (born 1983), American stage and voice-over actor
- Jason Adams, American guitarist for the band Lustra
- Jason Adams (EastEnders), a character in a British soap opera
