= Eat a Bowl of Tea (film) =

Film by Wayne Wang

- Directed by: Wayne Wang
- Written by: Judith Rascoe
- Based on: Eat a Bowl of Tea by Louis Chu
- Produced by: Tom Sternberg
- Starring: Cora Miao; Russell Wong; Victor Wong; Siu-Ming Lau; Eric Tsang
- Cinematography: Amir Mokri
- Music by: Mark Adler
- Distributed by: Columbia Pictures
- Release date: July 21, 1989
- Running time: 103 minutes
- Country: United States

Eat a Bowl of Tea is a 1989 film directed by Wayne Wang based on the novel Eat a Bowl of Tea by Louis Chu.

It is a Chinese American romantic film starring Cora Miao, Russell Wong, Victor Wong, Siu-Ming Lau and Eric Tsang.

== Plot ==
The story begins with exposition of the difficult lives of the first generation of male Chinese-American immigrants who were not allowed to bring their wives and families with them into the United States due to the Chinese Exclusion Act. For decades, these immigrant men have not seen their families they had left back in China. Ben is the son of one these immigrants and has just finished serving in the U.S. Army during World War II. Due to the War Brides Act, Ben is allowed to bring a bride back from China, which he does after an arranged marriage. Mei Oi, the bride, besides being attracted to Ben also wants to see her father who emigrated to the U.S. before she was born. As one of the early couples of child-bearing age within New York's Chinatown, Ben and Mei Oi have to deal with the expectations of the entire Chinatown community as well as his father. However, the pressures on Ben render him impotent, and in her confusion over his seeming lack of interest, Mei Oi succumbs to the attentions of Ah Song. Their affair creates complications for their own marriage and for the reputations of their fathers in the close-knit "bachelor society" of Chinatown.

== Cast ==
- Cora Miao as Mei Oi
- Russell Wong as Ben Loy
- Victor Wong as Wah Gay
- Siu-Ming Lau as Lee Gong
- Eric Tsang as Ah Song (as Eric Tsiang Chi Wai)
- Sau-Kei as Bok Fat (as Lee Sau Kee)
- Yuen Fat Fai as Letter Writer
- Fan Hui as Ben Loy's Mother (as Hui Fun)
- Lan Law as Aunt Gim
- Yuen-Yee Ng as Third Sister
- Wu Ming Yu as Mei Oi's Mother
- Ta Lei as Movie Translator (as Tat Lui)
- Wai Wong as Chuck Ting
- Philip Chan as Henry Wang
- Yu-Yung Teng as Fat Man (as Tang Shun Nin)
- Jessica Harper as American prostitute (uncredited)

== Critical reception ==
Variety wrote "Wayne Wang returns to Chinatown with Eat a Bowl of Tea and recaptures the relaxed humor and deep emotions of his earlier Dim Sum in the process."
