= Haing S. Ngor =

Cambodian-American actor and physician (1940–1996)

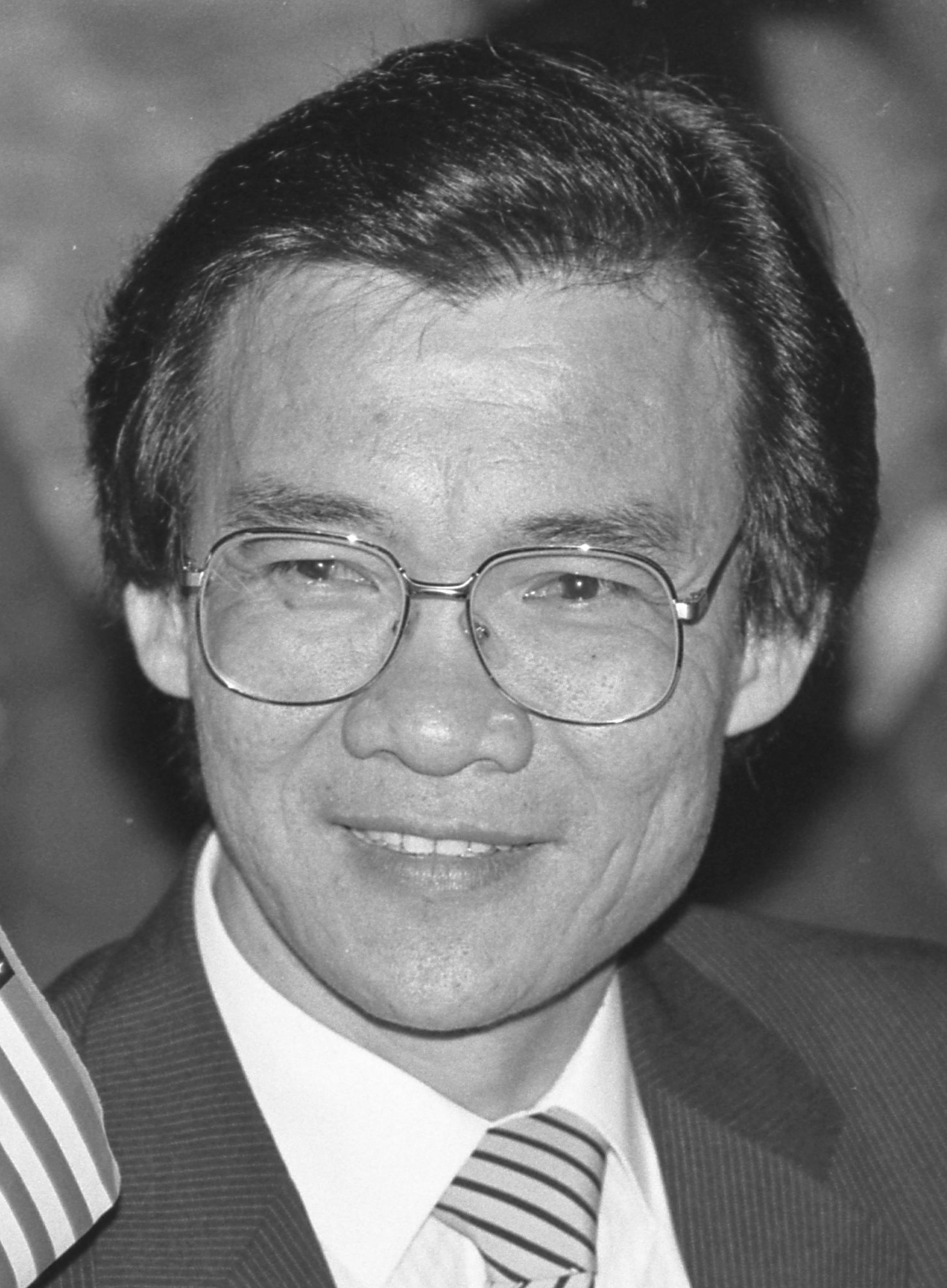
- Ngor in 1986
- Born: Haing Somnang Ngor; March 22, 1940; Samrong Yong, French Cambodia
- Died: February 25, 1996 (aged 55); Los Angeles, California, U.S.
- Cause of death: Murder (gunshot wounds)
- Resting place: Rose Hills Memorial Park
- Citizenship: Cambodia (1953–1986); U.S. (from 1986)
- Occupations: Actor; physician; activist
- Years active: 1984–1996
- Spouse: Chang My-Huoy (died 1978)
- Relatives: Chan Sarun (brother)

Haing Somnang Ngor (Note: Khmer: ហាំង សំណាង ង៉ោ, Hăng Sâmnang Ngaô [haŋˈsɑmnaːŋˈŋao]) (March 22, 1940 – February 25, 1996) was a Cambodian and American actor, physician, and activist. He made his acting debut in the biographical drama film The Killing Fields (1984) as journalist Dith Pran, for which he won the Academy Award for Best Supporting Actor, becoming the first actor of Asian descent to win the award and one of the only two amateur actors to win an Academy Award, following Harold Russell.

Ngor practiced as a physician before the start of the Cambodian genocide in 1975. He eventually survived the genocide, immigrating to the United States in 1980. There, he became active in humanitarian efforts assisting the Cambodian community.

In 1996, Ngor was murdered outside his home in Los Angeles. The case was speculated to be linked to the Khmer Rouge, which remains unconfirmed.

== Early life ==
Haing Somnang Ngor was born on March 22, 1940, in Samrong Yong, a Cambodian village in the present-day Bati district of Takéo province. At the time, Cambodia was part of French Indochina. His mother was Khmer, and his father was of Chinese descent.

Ngor trained as a gynecologist and obstetrician. He practiced in Phnom Penh before the capture of the city by Pol Pot's Khmer Rouge in 1975, marking the start of the Cambodian genocide. Ngor had to conceal his education, medical skills, and the fact that he wore glasses to avoid the new regime's intense hostility to intellectuals and professionals. Ngor was expelled from Phnom Penh with the bulk of its two million inhabitants as part of the Khmer Rouge's idea Year Zero and sent to a rice farm with his wife, Chang My-Huoy, who required a cesarean section and died with the couple's unborn child during labor in 1978 because it was impossible to perform the surgery without risking the whole family's life. He survived three terms in prison, using his medical knowledge to keep himself alive by eating beetles, termites, and scorpions.

After the fall of the Khmer Rouge in 1979, Ngor and his niece crawled to safety in a refugee camp, which was run by the Red Cross in Thailand, and he subsequently worked as a physician there. The next year, they moved to the United States, settling in Los Angeles. Later in his life, Ngor was unable to resume his medical practice and did not remarry.

== Career ==
Despite having no previous acting experience, Ngor was cast as Cambodian-American journalist Dith Pran in the biographical drama film The Killing Fields (1984), for which he won the Academy Award for Best Supporting Actor, becoming the first actor of Asian descent to win the award and one of the only two amateur actors to win an Academy Award, following Harold Russell. Ngor was not initially interested in the role, but interviews with the filmmakers changed his mind, as he recalled that he promised his wife to tell Cambodia's story to the world. After appearing in the film, he told People, "I wanted to show the world how deep starvation is in Cambodia, how many people die under communist regime. My heart is satisfied. I have done something perfect."

In 1987, Ngor published his autobiography, Haing Ngor: A Cambodian Odyssey, in which he described his life under the Khmer Rouge. Ngor went on to appear in various other onscreen projects, most memorably in Vanishing Son (1994–1995) and the biographical war drama film Heaven & Earth (1993). He also appeared in the Hong Kong action film Eastern Condors (1987).

Ngor appeared in a supporting role in the 1989 Vietnam War drama The Iron Triangle and guest-starred in a two-episode storyline on the acclaimed series China Beach (episodes "How to Stay Alive in Vietnam 1 & 2") as a wounded Cambodian prisoner of war who befriends Colleen McMurphy while under her care. Ngor guest-starred in an episode of Miami Vice called "The Savage / Duty and Honor". In My Life (1993), Ngor portrayed Mr. Ho, a spiritual healer who provides guidance for Bob Jones (Michael Keaton) and his wife Gail (Nicole Kidman) after Bob is diagnosed with terminal cancer, months before the birth of the couple's first child.

== Humanitarian work ==
Ngor and his close friend Jack Ong established the Dr. Haing S. Ngor Foundation to assist in raising funds for Cambodian aid. As part of his humanitarian efforts, Ngor built an elementary school and operated a small sawmill that provided jobs and an income for local families.

== Personal life ==
Ngor became a naturalized U.S. citizen in 1986. He was a Buddhist.

== Death and legacy ==
On February 25, 1996, Ngor was shot and killed outside his home in Chinatown, Los Angeles. Three alleged members of the "Oriental Lazy Boyz" street gang, who had prior arrests for snatching purses and jewelry, were charged with the murder. They were tried together in the Superior Court of Los Angeles County, though their cases were heard by three separate juries. Prosecutors argued that they killed Ngor because, after handing over his gold Rolex watch willingly, he refused to give them a locket that contained a photo of his late wife, My-Huoy. Defense attorneys suggested the murder was a politically motivated killing carried out by sympathizers of the Khmer Rouge. Kang Kek Iew, a former Khmer Rouge official on trial in Cambodia, claimed in November 2009 that Ngor was murdered on Pol Pot's orders, but U.S. investigators did not find him credible.

Some criticized the theory that Ngor was killed in a bungled robbery, pointing to $2,900 in cash that had been left behind and that the thieves had not rifled his pockets. Why the thieves would have demanded his locket is not known; Ngor typically wore the locket next to his skin under his clothing, so it would not have been easily visible. As of 2003, the locket had not been recovered.

All of the defendants were found guilty on April 16, 1998, the same day Pol Pot's death was confirmed in Cambodia. Tak Sun Tan was sentenced to 56 years to life; Indra Lim to 26 years to life; and Jason Chan to life sentence without parole. In 2004, the U.S. District Court for the Central District of California granted Tak Sun Tan's habeas corpus petition, finding that prosecutors had manipulated the jury's sympathy by presenting false evidence. This decision was reversed, and the conviction was ultimately upheld by the United States Court of Appeals for the Ninth Circuit in July 2005.

Many Cambodians claimed they had a stake in his estate, with one woman claiming he had married her after coming to the United States. Most of Ngor's Cambodian assets went to his younger brother, Chan Sarun, while his American assets were used up in legal fees staving off claims to his estate. He was buried at Rose Hills Memorial Park, Whittier, California.

After the release of The Killing Fields, Ngor had told a New York Times reporter, "If I die from now on, OK! This film will go on for a hundred years."

Dith Pran, whom Ngor portrayed in The Killing Fields, said of Ngor's death, "He is like a twin with me. He is like a co-messenger and right now I am alone."

== Filmography ==
=== Film ===
Year	Title	Role	Notes
1984	The Killing Fields	Dith Pran	Credited as Dr. Haing S. Ngor; Academy Award for Best Supporting Actor; BAFTA Award for Best Actor in a Leading Role; BAFTA Award for Most Promising Newcomer to Leading Film Roles; Boston Society of Film Critics Award for Best Actor; Golden Globe Award for Best Supporting Actor – Motion Picture
1986	The Kinmen Bombs	James Wu	
1987	In Love and War	Major Bui	TV movie
1987	Eastern Condors	Yeung Lung	
1989	The Iron Triangle	Colonel Tuong, NVA	
1989	Vietnam War Story: The Last Days	Major Huyen	(segment "The Last Outpost")
1990	Vietnam, Texas	Wong	
1990	Last Flight Out	Pham Van Minh	TV movie
1991	Ambition	Tatay	
1993	My Life	Mr. Ho	
1993	Heaven & Earth	Papa	
1994	Vanishing Son	The General	TV movie
1994	Fortunes of War	Khoy Thuon	
1994	Vanishing Son II	The General	TV movie
1994	Vanishing Son III	The General	TV movie
1994	Vanishing Son IV	The General	TV movie
1994	The Dragon Gate	Sensei	
1996	Hit Me	Billy Tungpet	Posthumous release, (final film role)

=== Television ===
Year	Title	Role	Notes
1987	Miami Vice	Nguyen Van Trahn	Episode: "The Savage / Duty and Honor"
1989	Highway to Heaven	Truong Vann Diep	Episode: "Choices"
1989	China Beach	Seak Yin	Episodes: "How to Stay Alive in Vietnam (Parts 1 & 2)"
1992	The Commish	Nhu Hao Duong	Episode: "Charlie Don't Surf"
