= Russell Wong =

American actor (born 1963)

- 王盛德
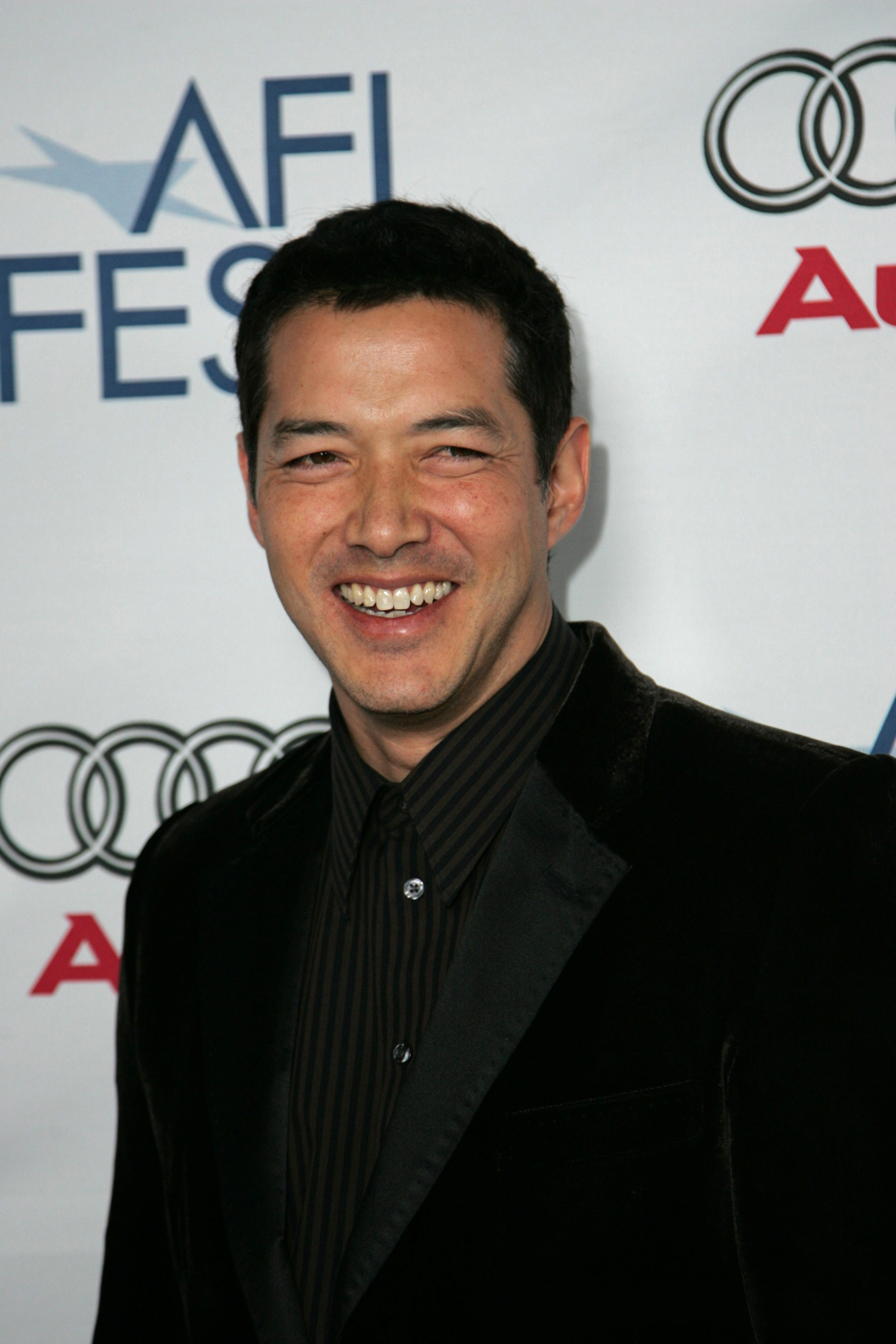
- Wong in 2009
- Born: March 1, 1963 (age 63); Troy, New York
- Other name: Russell Jan Tak Wong
- Occupation: Actor
- Years active: 1985–present
- Height: 1.83 m (6 ft 0 in)
- Spouse: Flora Cheong-Leen (m. 2003; div. 2012)
- Children: 1
- Relatives: Michael Wong (brother); Declan Wong (brother)
- Website: www.russellwong.com

Russell Wong (Chinese: 王盛德; Jyutping: Wong4 Sing6 Dak1:born March 1, 1963) is an American actor. Born in New York, Wong attended Santa Monica City College while training to become a dancer. With the desire of becoming an actor, he moved to Hong Kong in 1983, where he learned Cantonese and martial arts, leading to his first film role in The Musical Singer (1985), directed by Dennis Yu. His first English-language film was Tai-Pan (1986).

== Early life ==
Wong was born in Troy, New York, to a Chinese-American father William S. Wong and Dutch-American mother Connie Van Yserloo (d. 2024). Wong's father emigrated to the United States from Shandong Province, China.

Wong attended Santa Monica City College and trained to be a dancer.

== Career ==
He went on to work with director Wayne Wang in Eat a Bowl of Tea (1989) and The Joy Luck Club (1993). He also had supporting roles in China Cry: A True Story (1990) and New Jack City (1991). He landed the lead role in the TV series Vanishing Son (1994), which is regarded as one of the first American dramatic television series to feature an Asian lead. His breakthrough performance came after he starred opposite Jet Li in the action film Romeo Must Die (2000). He reunited with Li in The Mummy: Tomb of the Dragon Emperor (2008), portraying General Ming Guo. Wong is credited with helping to change the way Asians are represented in American film and television.

Wong is one of the first actors of Chinese descent to hold a leading role in a primetime American television series, portraying Jian-Wa with Chi Muoi Lo portraying Wago in the highly rated critically acclaimed Vanishing Son, first in a series of a made-for-television films followed by a 13-episode syndicated series. He has appeared in numerous films and series including Abel Ferrara's China Girl, New Jack City, The Joy Luck Club, Takedown, The Monkey King, Romeo Must Die, and The Mummy: Tomb of the Dragon Emperor.

In 2014, Wong finished shooting a horror series entitled Grace which was shot in Singapore for HBO Asia, and also directed by Serangoon Road co-director Tony Tilse.

Outside film and television, Wong played the protagonist Nicholas Kang in the video game True Crime: Streets of LA (2003). He also lent his voice to the video game Stranglehold (2007).

== Personal life ==
His two brothers Michael Wong and Declan Wong are also actors. During his time as a dancer, Wong was in a relationship with a fellow dancer Eartha Robinson from the mid-1980s. Their daughter, Eja Robinson-Wong, was born in 1988. Wong and Robinson's relationship was ended by 1993. In 2003, Wong married Hong Kong fashion designer Flora Cheong-Leen. The couple divorced in 2012.

Wong is trained in several martial arts, including Taekwondo, Shoji Ryu Karate, and Fu Jow Pai Kung fu.

== Filmography ==
=== Film ===
Year	Title	Role	Notes
1985	The Musical Singer	Russell	
1986	Tai-Pan	Gordon Chen	
1987	Gwai ma hau yuen	Mr. Wong	
1987	China Girl	Yung Gan	
1989	Eat a Bowl of Tea	Ben Loy	
1989	China White	Bobby Chow	
1990	China Cry	Lam Cheng Shen	
1991	New Jack City	Park	
1992	Xia ri qing ren	Zeniger	
1993	Geoffrey Beene 30	Man	Short film
1993	The Joy Luck Club	Lin Xiao	
1994	Zhong jin shu	Ken Chan	
1998	The Prophecy II	Danyeal	Direct-to-video
2000	Takedown	Tsutomi Shimomura	
2000	Romeo Must Die	Kai	
2004	Twisted	Lieutenant Tong	
2005	Inside Out	Frank	
2006	Undoing	Leon	
2006	Honor	Ray	
2008	The Mummy: Tomb of the Dragon Emperor	Ming Guo	
2008	House of Wong	The Man	Short film
2008	Dim Sum Funeral	Alexander	
2009	The Sanctuary	Patrick	Thai film
2010	Color Me Love	Zoe's Ex-husband	
2011	What Women Want	Peter	
2011	Snow Flower and the Secret Fan	Bank CEO	
2013	The Hong Kong Affair	Edward Lim	
2014	Light from the Dark Room	Li Cheung	
2016	Lost in the Pacific	Gary Gao	
2016	Winter in Tokyo	Toru Ishida, Keiko's father	Indonesian-Japanese film
2016	Contract to Kill	Matthew Sharp	Credited as "Russel Wong"
2017	The Jade Pendant	Mr. Wong	
2018	Forever Young	General	
2019	Escape Plan: The Extractors	Wu Zhang	
2019	Miss Boundless	Yajin	Short film
2021	Clifford the Big Red Dog	Mr. Yu	
2026	Swallowtail & Dragonfly	Stuart Morton	

=== Television ===
Year	Title	Role	Notes
1987	Harry's Hong Kong	Sergeant Lee	TV movie
1988	C.A.T. Squad: Python Wolf		TV movie
1988	The Equalizer	Narong Bansari	Episode: "Riding the Elephant"
1989	21 Jump Street	Locke	Episode: "The Dragon and the Angel"
1989	Gideon Oliver	Li Song	Episode: "Tungs"
1994	Vanishing Son	Jian-Wa	TV movie
1994	Vanishing Son II	Jian-Wa	TV movie
1994	Vanishing Son III	Jian-Wa	TV movie
1994	Vanishing Son IV	Jian-Wa	TV movie
1995	Vanishing Son	Jian-Wa	13 episodes
1997	Hawaii Five-O	Nick Wong	Unaired Pilot
1998	Touched by an Angel	George	2 episodes
1998	Honolulu CRU		Episode: "Pilot"
2001	The Monkey King	Monkey King	TV miniseries
2001	The Tracker	Rick Tsung	TV movie
2003	Black Sash	Tom Chang	8 episodes
2004	CSI: Crime Scene Investigation	Lieutenant Arthur Chen	Episode: "No Humans Involved"
2005	Just Legal	District Attorney	Episode: "Pilot"
2005	Commander in Chief	Cabinet Member	Episode: "First Disaster"
2006	Numb3rs	Jeremy Wang	Episode: "Undercurrents"
2010	Nikita	Victor Han	Episode: "Rough Trade"
2012	Hawaii Five-0	Kong Liang	Episode: "Ohuna"
2013	Serangoon Road	Winston	Episode: "#1.10"
2014	Grace	Roy Chan	4 episodes
2015	NCIS: New Orleans	Cam Lin	Episode: "The Walking Dead"
2017	Criminal Minds: Beyond Borders	Inspector Jin	Episode: "Type A"
2018	Lucifer	Vincent Green	Episode: "High School Poppycock"
2018	Lethal Weapon	Stan	Episode: "Need to Know"
2019	Supergirl	General Tan	Episode: "Suspicious Minds"
2019	The Oath		4 episodes
2020	Westworld	Brompton	3 episodes
2024	The Brothers Sun	Byron Chien	Episode: "Country boy"
2024	NCIS	Feng Zhao	Episode: "The Plan"
2024	High Potential	Officer Jean	Episode: "The Sauna at the End of the Stairs"

=== Video games ===
Year	Title	Role	Notes/Ref.
2003	True Crime: Streets of LA	Nick Kang	Voice Role
2007	Stranglehold	Yung Gi	Voice Role
