= Jack Ong =

American actor

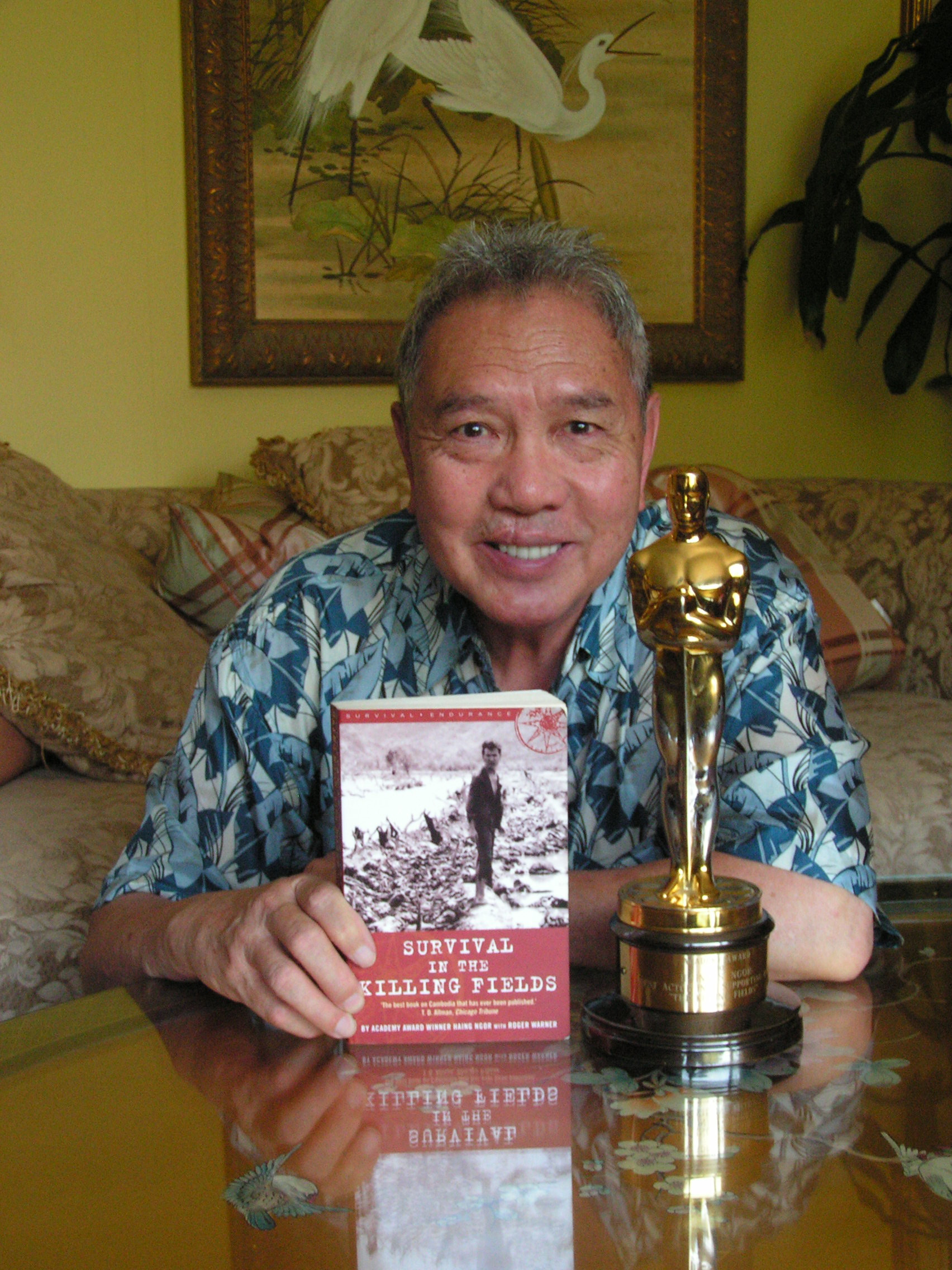
- Ong in 2004
- Born: November 6, 1940; Mesa, Arizona, U.S.
- Died: June 13, 2017 (aged 76); Castle Rock, Colorado, U.S.
- Occupations: Actor, writer, activist, marketing professional
- Years active: 1974–2017

Jack Ong (November 6, 1940 – June 13, 2017) was an American actor, writer, activist and marketing professional.

== Early life ==
Ong was born in Mesa, Arizona, the seventh of eight children of Chinese immigrant parents, Kam Fong and Jeung Shee Ong. His family owned and operated a small grocery store, where he received an early education in the business world. Growing up as a part of a very small minority, he quickly realized the benefits of escaping reality and delving into the world of the film industry. Ong earned his B.A. at the Walter Cronkite School of Journalism and Mass Communication at Arizona State University. He worked his way through college as a staff reporter-photographer with the Mesa Daily Tribune, which had recruited him before his high school graduation. He moved to Los Angeles after college.

== Military service ==
Ong served as a Navy photojournalist during the Vietnam War, assigned to the Commander, Seventh Fleet, in the Philippines. His reporting and photography were published in Stars and Stripes and frequently circulated by the global wire services.

== Marketing/advertising ==
After his stint in the Navy, Ong worked as an advertising executive, writing and creating print, radio, TV, point-of-purchase and billboard campaigns for the International Hotel (now the Hilton) in Las Vegas, where he also worked on publicity for such entertainers as Elvis Presley, Barbra Streisand, Peggy Lee and Bill Cosby. He also worked on marketing and promotional campaigns for Galpin Motors, the largest and most successful automobile enterprise in the world; and Topanga Plaza, America's first mega-shopping mall.

== Acting career ==
A dramatic as well as comedic actor, Ong guest starred in numerous hit television series including Cold Case, ER, Friends, The Suite Life of Zack & Cody, The Bernie Mac Show, Still Standing, Dharma & Greg, Touched by an Angel, V.I.P., Chicago Hope, The Simpsons, and Beverly Hills, 90210. Ong has also been featured in multiple films including Next (2007), Akeelah and the Bee (2005), Art School Confidential (2005), National Lampoon's Gold Diggers (2004), Leprechaun in the Hood (2000), Godzilla 2000 (1999), The Iron Triangle (1989), and Mac and Me (1988). He also received critical praise for his work in several short films including Saving Levi, Laundromat, and 2010's Journey of a Paper Son. Ong's face was made familiar across North America thanks to his classic 1994 commercial for Kan-Tong Fried Rice.

Ong also had numerous voice acting credits, including the Time Warner audiobooks Rich Dad's Success Stories; The Art of Profitability, which won an Audie Award for best business/education audiobook; and 100 Most Loved Poems, which won a Grammy nomination for best spoken word recording in 2001; as well as many video game roles.

On stage, Ong appeared in the hit production of Stephen Sondheim's Tony Award-winning musical, Follies, at East West Players, America's first and foremost Asian American theatre company. He also portrayed a Vietnamese Minister of Trade in the world premiere production of The Reunification Hotel by Julian Barry, Tony Award-winning author of "Lenny."

== Ministry and activism ==
Ong was a licensed minister with the Missionary Church, and was senior pastor of the Venice Christian Community Church in the mid-1980s until its closure. His missionary work extended to AIDS patients in Hollywood, CA, as well as short-term tours in Taiwan, Hong Kong, New Zealand, Sri Lanka, Thailand and Cambodia. His ministry also focused on serving as executive director of The Dr. Haing S. Ngor Foundation, which he established in 1991 with the late Oscar-winning actor of The Killing Fields. An active member of Screen Actors Guild (former member of the Hollywood branch board of directors) and the American Federation of Television and Radio Artists, he served as chair of the SAG/AFTRA Ethnic Equal Opportunities Steering Committee, organized the Asian American Coalition for Total Inclusion on the Networks (AACTION), and was part of a national multi-ethnic coalition working for diversity throughout the media industries. Ong also served on the advisory council of Born to Act Players, a unique organization formed by actor Mary Rings, dedicated to providing a supportive environment for students with special needs to learn and grow by expressing themselves through the performing arts.

In addition, Ong was an active member (and former board member) of the Chinese Historical Society of Southern California and a hands-on supporter of various educational, religious, cultural and community outreach organizations, institutions and causes, including the West Los Angeles United Methodist Church, East West Players, Chinese American Museum, Shoah Foundation and P.A.T.H. (People Assisting the Homeless). Ong was awarded a Golden Spike Award for "Excellence in Community Service" by the Chinese Historical Society of Southern California during Asian Pacific American Heritage Month celebrations in May 2013.

== Death ==
Jack Ong died on June 13, 2017, in Castle Rock, Colorado, due to complications from a brain tumor that he was diagnosed with in April 2016.
