= China White (film) =

1989 Hong Kong film by Ronny Yu

- DVD cover
- Traditional Chinese: 轟天龍虎會
- Simplified Chinese: 轰天龙虎会
- Hanyu Pinyin: Hōng Tiān Lóng Hǔ Huì
- Jyutping: Gwang1 Tin1 Lung4 Fu2 Weoi2
- Directed by: Ronny Yu
- Screenplay by: F.W. Silleroy; Victor Hon
- Produced by: Jim Choi
- Starring: Andy Lau; Alex Man; Carina Lau; Russell Wong; Ku Feng
- Cinematography: Andrew Lau
- Edited by: Peter Jones
- Music by: Les Gock
- Production company: Fu Ngai Film Production
- Distributed by: Fu Ngai Film Production
- Release date: 4 November 1989
- Running time: 99 minutes
- Country: Hong Kong
- Language: Cantonese
- Box office: HK$11.4 million

China White is a 1989 Hong Kong action crime film directed by Ronny Yu and starring Andy Lau, Carina Lau, Alex Man, Russell Wong and Ku Feng. Set in Amsterdam, the film deals with the rivalry between a Chinese and an Italian gang.

== Plot ==
Chung Chi (Ku Feng) leads Roast Chicken (Andy Lau) and Tai Lan Choi (Alex Man) as the largest triad organization in the Chinatown of Amsterdam. Singer Yin Hung (Carina Lau), who is performing in Amsterdam, was abducted, but was fortunately rescued Chi and his underlings. However, at the same time, it led to an outbreak of bloody battles. After everything subsides, Chi and Hung got married, while Roast Chicken, who has a crush on Hung, feels dejected. The rival gang took the opportunity to attack and during a shootout, Roast Chicken and Tai Lan Choi were killed while covering Chi to escape, and their driver Chan Chiu was also crippled. However, Yin Hung was able to protect Tai Lai Choi's sons Bobby and Danny. Chi rescued Bobby (Russell Wong) and Danny (Steven Vincent Leigh) while also raising them. After more than a decade, Chi restores his power in Chinatown and united also rival gangs together and sets a peaceful and mutual beneficial treaty. Everyone elected Chi as the Godfather and is referred as Uncle Chi for keeping a peaceful atmosphere in Chinatown. However, the new, mafia boss Scalia (Billy Drago) has always wanted to intervene in Chinatown and secretly uses Turkish drug dealer as a spy and colludes with Chi's rival Chinese-Vietnamese citizen Fan Tai Tung (William Ho) to ambush and kill Chi. Bobby and Danny were able to escape brew another big bloody massacre.

== Cast ==
- Andy Lau as Roast Chicken
- Alex Man as Tai Lan Choi
- Carina Lau as Yin Hung
- Russell Wong as Bobby Chow
- Ku Feng as Chung Chi
- Billy Drago as Scalia
- Steven Vincent Leigh as Danny Chow
- Lisa Schrage as Anne Micheals
- Victor Hon as One Hand
- William Ho as Fan Tai Tung
- Tommy Wong as Mute
- Rocky Lai as Min
- Saskia van Rijswijk as Henchwoman
- Ricky Ho as Kong
- Shing Fui-On as Tuko
- Fung Yuen Chi
- Ronny Yu as Tong leader (cameo)
- Poon Cheung
- Chun Kwai Bo
- Chan Tat Kwong
- Mak Wai Cheung
- Suen Kwok Ming as thug
- John Chan as Ho
- Nirut Sirijanya as General Ching
- Raymond Fung as Uncle Chung
- Lai Sing Kwong as thug

== Box office ==
The film grossed HK$11,421,934 during its theatrical run from 4 to 28 November 1989 in Hong Kong.

== Incident ==
During the late 1980s in Hong Kong, actress Carina Lau was abducted by triad members for refusing a film offer from a triad boss, which became a very publicized case. In 2008, film producer and former chairman of the Hong Kong Film Award Manfred Wong revealed on his blog that Lau was abducted and forced to fly to the Netherlands to act in China White, alongside co-stars Andy Lau and Alex Man, who were forced to do the same.

For many years, rumors circulated that Andy Lau, one of the top box office draws in Hong Kong, was once forced at gunpoint by triads to shoot a film. Wong also confirmed on his blog that China White was the film that Lau was forced at gunpoint to act in.

Many people believe that producer Jim Choi, who would benefit the most from it, was the mastermind of the case. Choi, who was the manager of Jet Li and Nina Li, was shot dead in 1992 at the age of 38. After Choi's death, there were many rumors surrounding around it including his connection to the Netherlands triads, keeping Li away from other film producers and karma for his actions in filming China White.
