= Madman of the People =

- Genre: Sitcom
- Created by: Chris Cluess; Stu Kreisman
- Directed by: James Burrows; Jim Drake; Philip Charles MacKenzie; John Ratzenberger
- Starring: Dabney Coleman; Concetta Tomei; Amy Aquino; Craig Bierko; Cynthia Gibb; John Ales
- Country of origin: United States
- Original language: English
- No. of seasons: 1
- No. of episodes: 16

Production
- Executive producers: Chris Cluess; Stu Kreisman; E. Duke Vincent; Aaron Spelling
- Producers: Penny Adams; Stephen C. Grossman
- Camera setup: Multi-camera
- Running time: 30 minutes
- Production companies: Kreiscluesco Industries; Spelling Television

Original release
- Network: NBC
- Release: September 22, 1994 – June 17, 1995

Madman of the People is an American sitcom television series created by Chris Cluess and Stu Kreisman, that aired on NBC from September 22, 1994, to June 17, 1995. It was scheduled in the Thursday 9:30 timeslot, part of Must See TV.

Madman of the People was produced by Spelling Television.

== Synopsis ==
The series stars character actor Dabney Coleman as Jack "Madman" Buckner, an outspoken newspaper columnist who had written a popular column, Madman of the People, in Your Times magazine for 30 years. The premise of the show involves Buckner's daughter, Meg (Cynthia Gibb), being brought in by the publisher to bring Buckner's column into the 1990s.

== Cast ==
- Dabney Coleman as Jack "Madman" Buckner
- Concetta Tomei as Delia Buckner
- Cynthia Gibb as Meg Buckner
- John Ales as Dylan Buckner
- Amy Aquino as Sasha Danziger
- Craig Bierko as B.J. Cooper

== Episodes ==
No.	Title	Directed by	Written by	Original release date	Viewers (millions)
1	"Pilot"	James Burrows	Chris Cluess & Stu Kreisman	September 22, 1994	22.7
2	"Murder Most Fowl"	John Ratzenberger	Sally Lapiduss & Pamela Eells	September 29, 1994	23.2
3	"All Work and No Play Makes Jack a Mad Boy"	James Burrows	Steve Paymer	October 6, 1994	21.7
4	"Guys Just Wanna Have Fun"	John Ratzenberger	Bill Fuller & Jim Pond	October 13, 1994	20.9
5	"'Til Death Do Us Part"	Jim Drake	Sally Lapiduss & Pamela Eells	October 20, 1994	18.8
6	"The Jack Buckner Society"	Philip Charles MacKenzie	Alison Rosenfeld Desmarais	October 27, 1994	18.9
7	"Birthday in the Big House"	Philip Charles MacKenzie	Bill Fuller & Jim Pond	November 3, 1994	21.5
8	"Jack Has Left the Building"	Philip Charles MacKenzie	Tom Seeley & Norm Gunzenhauser	December 1, 1994	18.1
9	"Life Without Father"	Jim Drake	Steve Paymer	December 8, 1994	21.4
10	"It's a Mad, Mad, Mad, Mad Christmas"	Jim Drake	Deidre Fay & Stuart Wolpert	December 15, 1994	21.9
11	"What a Big Mouth You Have, Grammy"	John Ratzenberger	Tom Seeley & Norm Gunzenhauser	December 29, 1994	17.9
12	"Notes from the Underground"	Philip Charles MacKenzie	Dinah Kirgo	January 5, 1995	26.9
13	"Truths My Father Told"	Philip Charles MacKenzie	Bill Fuller & Jim Pond	January 12, 1995	24.3
14	"The Pen is Mightier Than the Sword"	Jim Drake	Tom Seeley & Norm Gunzenhauser	January 26, 1995	24.2
15	"Anytime, Anywhere"	Philip Charles MacKenzie	Stephen Neigher	June 10, 1995	6.7
16	"The Madman and the Showgirl"	Philip Charles MacKenzie	Dava Savel	June 17, 1995	6.5

== Reception ==
Though the series earned good ratings, ranking 12th for the season with a 14.9 average household share, it was pulled from NBC's schedule in January 1995 and cancelled before the 1994-95 season was officially over. It is one of the highest-rated 1st-year shows to ever get cancelled during its initial season. NBC soured on the show because it lost a considerable portion of its lead-in audience from Seinfeld and was also hindering the then-freshman hit drama ER. NBC noticed the early success of Friends and decided to re-shuffle its lineup to put that show in the 9:30 PM EST spot, leading to one of the most dominant programming blocs in TV history. The last two episodes aired in June 1995, during the period that was formerly called "Burn-off Theatre", when networks would make more money airing new episodes (with plenty of paid advertisements) of already-doomed shows than it would from repeats of shows that were returning for the next TV season, and reality TV was not commonly made as a source for cheaper original summertime programming.

When it first aired, Madman of the People was considered by critics as one of "the fall season's least likable new comedies" and not deserving of its comedy label.

== Inter-series continuity ==
Episode 7, "Birthday in the Big House", was promoted to directly tie in with the same night's episodes of both Friends and Mad About You. All three series were set in New York City and all aired on NBC on Thursday evenings. Accordingly, a continuing plot thread ran through all three shows broadcast on November 3, 1994: a city-wide blackout caused by the character of Jamie in the Mad About You episode "Pandora's Box" continued through to the Madman of the People episode "Birthday in the Big House", and concluded in the Friends episode "The One With The Blackout". None of the characters crossed over from one series to another in these episodes; only the details of the blackout situation were used to create a crossover effect. (The series Seinfeld, which also aired on Thursday evenings on NBC and was also set in New York, chose not to participate in this crossover event.)
