= Vanishing Son =

Television series

- Created by: Rob Cohen
- Directed by: John Nicolella (TV movies)
- Starring: Russell Wong; Chi Muoi Lo; Rebecca Gayheart; Haing S. Ngor; Dustin Nguyen
- Composer: Jan Hammer
- Country of origin: United States
- Original language: English
- No. of seasons: 1
- No. of episodes: 13 (+ 4 TV movies)

Production
- Executive producers: Rob Cohen; Raffaella De Laurentiis; Stu Segall
- Running time: 45 minutes
- Production companies: Rob Cohen/Raffaella De Laurentiis Productions; Stu Segall Productions; MCA TV

Original release
- Network: Syndicated
- Release: January 16 – May 8, 1995

Vanishing Son is an American action television series that was part of Universal Television's Action Pack. Starting as a series of four television films in 1994, the full series of 13 episodes debuted in syndication on January 16, 1995. Vanishing Son I, Vanishing Son II, Vanishing Son III, and Vanishing Son IV aired on February 28, July 18, July 25, and October 10, 1994, respectively. The series is regarded as one of the first American dramatic TV series to feature an Asian lead.

== Overview ==
Russell Wong starred as Jian-Wa Chang, a musician who escaped from the People's Republic of China after being involved in a protest similar to, and essentially working as a direct stand-in for, the historically relevant 1989 Tiananmen Square protests. Jian-Wa escapes the subsequent massacre of students by the government. At this point, the show's general theme begins, as he and his brother Wago Chang (Chi Muoi Lo), who also was involved with the protests, escape to the United States. The story focuses on the two brothers as one pursues the "American Dream" through his music, while the other becomes drawn to a life of organized crime to achieve this goal.

Season	Episodes	Originally released	
Season	Episodes	First released	Last released
Movies		February 28, 1994	October 10, 1994
1	13	January 16, 1995	May 8, 1995

== Cast and characters ==
Character	TV movies				TV series
Character	Vanishing Son I	Vanishing Son II	Vanishing Son III	Vanishing Son IV	Season 1
Jian-Wa Chang	Russell Wong	Russell Wong	Russell Wong	Russell Wong	Russell Wong
Wago Chang	Chi Muoi Lo	Chi Muoi Lo	Chi Muoi Lo	Chi Muoi Lo	Chi Muoi Lo
Clair Rutledge	Rebecca Gayheart		Rebecca Gayheart	Rebecca Gayheart	
Lili	Vivian Wu	Vivian Wu	Vivian Wu	Vivian Wu	
Fu Qua Johnson	Marcus S. Chong	Marcus S. Chong		Marcus Chong	
Estabrook	Paul Butler	Paul Butler	Paul Butler	Paul Butler	
The General	Haing S. Ngor	Haing S. Ngor	Haing S. Ngor	Haing S. Ngor	Haing S. Ngor
Lanchi		Tamlyn Tomita		Tamlyn Tomita	Tamlyn Tomita
Reggie Valmont		Jamie Walters		Jamie Walters	
Mai		Ming-Na Wen		Ming-Na Wen	
Mickey Jo		Dean Stockwell			
Hung		Dustin Nguyen		Dustin Nguyen	Dustin Nguyen
Sandler			Jack Gwaltney	Jack Gwaltney	
Chou Pei			Luoyong Wang	Luoyong Wang	
Megan				Dee Wallace Stone	
Adams				Mark Valley	
Dawson				Matthew Lillard	
Dan Sandler					Jason Adams
Judith Phillips					Stephanie Niznik

== TV movies ==
=== Vanishing Son I ===
Vanishing Son I covers Jian-Wa and Wago's life in China, where Jian-Wa is taught violin by Teacher Beaton (Rob Cohen), and both Jian-Wa and Wago are trained in martial arts by Sifu Yamou (John Cheung). Both Jian-Wa and Wago participate in political demonstrations with their friend, Lili (Vivian Wu). As a result of getting into an altercation with military guards, their father, Louyung Chang (Kay Tong Lim), tells them to flee or else risk being arrested or killed by the Secret Police. They consequently emigrate to the United States via a fishing boat and are apprehended by a federal Immigration Agent named Estabrook (Paul Butler). After they are brought to a jail in San Bruno, Agent Estabrook uncovers photos of Jian-Wa and Wago in Time and releases them due to the asylum laws. After they attempt to get a series of low-paying odd jobs in and around Los Angeles, Jian-Wa becomes a musician and falls in love with a cellist, Clair Rutledge (Rebecca Gayheart). Wago joins a gang led by Fu Qua Johnson (Marcus Chong), whom the brothers met in jail. As Jian-Wa performs gigs and his relationship with Clair strengthens, Wago rises in the ranks of the criminal underworld. We also find out that Fu Qua's gang is ultimately run by a Vietnamese mobster named "The General" (Haing S. Ngor). Jian-Wa's life with Clair is encroached upon when he senses that Wago is in danger and rushes to protect him in a violent shootout at a Vietnamese tavern. After Wago refuses to flee with him, as police sirens close in on the tavern, he retreats and returns to Clair. The next morning, she awakens to find herself alone and reads Jian-Wa's letter professing his love for her. Yet, his dedication to his brother forced him to leave as he is wanted for questioning by authorities.

=== Vanishing Son II ===
In Vanishing Son II, Jian-Wa goes on the road to evade being questioned by the authorities about criminal activities and murders committed by his brother, Wago. Jian-Wa hitchhikes to a gulf community in Louisiana, where he meets a population of Vietnamese fishermen. The community consists of an elderly patriarch (Kim Chan), a quick-tempered young man named Hung (Dustin Nguyen), and his sister, Lanchi (Tamlyn Tomita), whom Jian-Wa is attracted to. A woman named Mai (Ming-Na Wen) lives in the community and falls for Reggie Valmont (Jamie Walters), the son of a local fisherman and Ku Klux Klan member named Mickey Jo (Dean Stockwell). Tensions between the Ku Klux Klan and the Vietnamese community explode in Little Saigon when Hung kills a local white fisherman in self-defense. Jian-Wa is planning to leave again when the Sheriff seeks him out for interrogation after having witnessed the event, but he reconsiders with Lanchi's persuasion. Reggie, who is also a witness, is torn between lying to please the good old boys and following his convictions. Ku Klux Klan members storm the Vietnamese community, and just when Jian-Wa and Hung are about to lose the fight, Wago arrives on the scene and rescues them. Jian-Wa bids farewell to Lanchi and the Vietnamese, once the National Guard and police units infiltrate the area, and goes to Washington, D.C., for a violin competition. The final scene reunites Wago with the woman he loves, Lili (Vivian Wu), who was thought to have been killed by the Secret Police in China during the riots.

=== Vanishing Son III ===
In Vanishing Son III, Jian-Wa is playing in a violin competition in Washington D.C., when he unexpectedly reunites with Clair again. He tells her the truth about Wago's crimes and the promise he made to their father to protect him. The two promptly rekindle their flame, yet it is short-lived once Jian-Wa returns to Los Angeles with her and is arrested by a federal task force bent on apprehending Wago and members of his gang. He is forced to go undercover to infiltrate the gang for information on a man called The General, but Jian-Wa is intending to utilize his position to rescue his brother. Meanwhile, with Fu Qua dead, Wago ascends to the top of The General's criminal organization, working with him, Lili, and a former Triad named Chou Pei (Wang Luoyong) to take down the "dragonheads" of the Triads. Jian-Wa works for Wago and is given designer suits, a new home, and a brand-new car. Jian-Wa resists romantic advancements from Lili, mindful of Wago's love for her. When Jian-Wa happens upon Clair once more while at a nightclub with Wago and Lili, Lili becomes envious and attempts to kill Clair with a car explosive after failing to seduce Jian-Wa one last time. Although she walked away from the event unharmed, Clair's close friend and fellow musician, Michael, is accidentally murdered in her place. Faced with the brutality that is organized crime, Clair questions Jian-Wa's involvement in a criminal lifestyle. Jian-Wa promises her protection and gives her a plane ticket to a safe location. Enraged, Jian-Wa confronts Lili over her orders to eliminate Clair and rebukes her as only a tool to be used by The General. Wago turns against his brother out of blind loyalty to Lili and resentment when Jian-Wa tries to confide in him about Lili's deception. Jian-Wa visits Estabrook later and learns that The General is a high-level CIA operative, and Lili is working with him (and is also his lover), planning to set up Wago to take a fall. In the climax, Wago's gang and the Triads are seized by government agents during an ambush. Amid the chaos, Jian-Wa faces off with Wago and Lily. Witnessing Wago become taken in by Jian-Wa's words, Lili manages to steal Wago's gun. Failing to de-escalate with Lili, Wago tries to subdue her, and the gun discharges, instantly killing her and fatally wounding himself. Before his last breath, he tells a mournful Jian-Wa that he never stopped loving him through everything. Estabrook and the task force happen upon the bodies of Wago and Lili as they scour the area. Jian-Wa has escaped.

=== Vanishing Son IV ===
In Vanishing Son IV, tormented by his brother's death, Jian-Wa is roaming around the countryside at night when he gets struck by a truck driven by two intoxicated teenagers, Adams (Mark Valley) and Dawson (Matthew Lillard). Jian-Wa is taken in by a reclusive woman named Megan (Dee Wallace) who lives nearby. While Jian-Wa recovers, he rouses Megan's interest in his identity. At first, Jian-Wa is unwilling to discuss the past, but with reassurance from the spirit of Wago, whom only he can see, he opens up. Through the learning of Jian-Wa's dark past, it is revealed that Megan has a dark past of her own and has chosen to isolate herself out of heavy guilt over the death of her young son in a carjacking incident. The two slowly connect through their shared heartaches. Jian-Wa urges her to make peace with her child's death and persevere. Once Wago's spirit warns him of impending danger, Jian-Wa fights off the two teenagers as they raid the cabin in an attempt to remove all evidence of their hit-and-run. Megan comes to terms with her son's death and goes into town to get the police. Jian-Wa takes to the road.

== TV series ==
The 13-episode series occurs after the events of Vanishing Son IV. At the end of Vanishing Son III, two US Federal Agents are killed and Jian-Wa is held responsible, therefore, he constantly is on the run from the authorities. However, "The General" is the true mastermind behind the murders. Jian-Wa becomes a fugitive, using his wisdom, music, and martial arts skills to solve problems along the way on his quest to bring The General to justice. The series has a lighter tone compared to the darker mood of the four telefilms, with Jian-Wa undertaking a new adventure in each episode. Jan Hammer composed the series' music and opening theme song.

As he helps others while traveling across America, he is aided by the spirit of his deceased brother, Wago, and meets an assortment of different characters along the way.

In the series, Jian-Wa is constantly on the run from ruthless Federal Agent Dan Sandler (Jason Adams), the direct superior of the agents killed in the two-hour films. Agent Judith Phillips (Stephanie Niznik) was a member of Sandler's team who was convinced that Jian-Wa was innocent, and she gradually became his ally. This put her at great odds with Sandler.

The series was not renewed after the initial thirteen episodes aired.

=== List of Vanishing Son episodes ===
No.	Title	Directed by	Written by	Original release date
1	"Dance of the Dust"	Norberto Barba	Robert Eisele	January 16, 1995
Jian-Wa becomes involved with a Latina labor organizer nicknamed V (Jacqueline Obradors).
2	"Holy Ghosts"	Gabrielle Beaumont	Tom Towler	January 23, 1995
Jian-Wa helps a man named Frank (Matt Letscher) track down information about his Vietnam War veteran father and fight another martial artist named Nguyen (Yuji Okumoto).
3	"Birds of Paradise"	Jesús Salvador Treviño	Brian Nelson	January 30, 1995
Jian-Wa comes to the aid of the Irish wife (Mary Elizabeth McGlynn) of an abusive Texan ostrich farmer and testifies in court for her innocence when she accidentally murders her husband in defense.
4	"Single Flame"	Charles Siebert	Galen Yuen	February 6, 1995
Jian-Wan reunites with Hung (Dustin Nguyen) and Lanchi (Tamlyn Tomita) in Oakland, California, where they moved to from Louisiana. The three get caught up in a gang dispute involving Hung and Lanchi's caucasian boyfriend.
5	"Sweet Sixteen"	Rick King	John Lau & Norma Safford Vela	February 13, 1995
Jian-Wan gets hired as a bodyguard/driver for the daughter (Aimee Brooks) of a wealthy man who lives in Rancho Santa Fe, only to find out that the daughter is more manipulative than she seems.
6	"Miracle Under 34th Street"	Gilbert M. Shilton	John Soriano & Tom Sylla	February 20, 1995
Jian-Wan receives help from an eccentric man named Issac (Kurt Fuller), who can also see the spirit of Wago.
7	"Runaway Hearts"	Ralph Hemecker	Brian Nelson	February 27, 1995
Jian-Wan assists a Chinese art smuggler and con artist named Dinah Lai (Una Damon) with recovering some stolen artifacts from the Han Dynasty that she intends to sell in order to free her friends in China.
8	"Lock and Load, Babe"	Nancy Malone	John Lau	March 6, 1995
Jian-Wan becomes embroiled in a twisted game run by a sadistic couple (Sofia Milos and Nicholas Guest) where a young African American boy named Cliff (Brandon Hammond) and his electrical engineer father Ray (Bobby Hosea) also get caught up in.
9	"Two Guys with Guns"	Roy Campanella II	Norma Safford Vela	March 13, 1995
Jian-Wan gets kidnapped along with another young girl named Beth (Dorie Barton) by two brothers, George Bruce (Stephen Ramsey) and Tom Bruce (Steve Larson), who are armed with guns and want to go down in history as famous criminals.
10	"Win, Place or Dead"	Ralph Hemecker	Norma Safford Vela	March 20, 1995
Jian-Wan helps out at a stable that breeds competitive horses and develops a relationship with a young rider named Tina (Alexandra Tydings), who ends up getting sabotaged by the proprietor of the stable, Harry (Forry Smith).
11	"Jersey Girl"	Ronald Víctor García	Maryanne Melloan	April 24, 1995
Jian-Wan comes to the aid of a singer named Dana (Sherrie Rose) in New Jersey.
12	"Long Ago and Far Away"	Charles Siebert	Don Shroll	May 1, 1995
Jian-Wan gets hired as a maitre d' "that women can fantasize about" by an owner of a restaurant, Rachel (Catherine Bell), who is reminded of her deceased former lover Mark whenever she sees Jian-Wa (who goes by "Jack").
13	"Land of the Free"	Gabrielle Beaumont	Brian Nelson	May 8, 1995
Jian-Wan assists another musician (flute player) he knew from the Beijing Philharmonic named Yu Lin (Peter James Smith) free the clutches of a Triad criminal organization who he serves as a bookkeeper for known as the Tien-Ching gang led by "dailo" White Powder Ma (George Chung) and his nephew Benny Ping (Stan Egi) in San Francisco, and which also has ties to The General.
