= In Love and War (1987 film) =

1987 American television film

- American cover
- Genre: Drama; Thriller
- Based on: In Love and War: The Story of a Family's Ordeal and Sacrifice During the Vietnam Years by Jim Stockdale; Sybil Stockdale
- Screenplay by: Carol Schreder
- Directed by: Paul Aaron
- Starring: James Woods; Jane Alexander
- Theme music composer: Charles Gross
- Country of origin: United States
- Original language: English

Production
- Executive producers: Jon Avnet; Steve Tisch
- Producer: Carol Schreder
- Cinematography: Gayne Rescher
- Editor: Skip Schoolnik
- Running time: 100 minutes
- Production companies: Carol Schneider Productions; Tisch/Avnet Productions Inc.

Original release
- Network: NBC
- Release: March 16, 1987

In Love and War (1987) is a Vietnam War-based thriller/drama television film starring James Woods and Jane Alexander. It was directed by Paul Aaron. The film is based on the true story of James Stockdale and Sybil Stockdale. James Stockdale, a highest-ranking naval officer, was held as a prisoner of war in Vietnam, while Sybil Stockdale became a co-founder, and then later served as the national coordinator of the National League of Families, a nonprofit organization that worked on behalf of American Vietnam-era Missing in Action and Prisoner of War Families. The film's screenplay was written by Carol Schreder, who was also one of the film's producers. The screenplay was based on the book In Love and War: The Story of a Family's Ordeal and Sacrifice During the Vietnam Years, which was written by James and Sybil Stockdale themselves.

The film's production companies were Carol Schneider Productions and Tisch/Avnet Productions Inc.

== Plot ==
In Love and War is an account of US Navy Commander James Stockdale's eight-year imprisonment in North Vietnam as a prisoner of war. During his confinement in sub-human living conditions within such camps as the infamous "Hanoi Hilton", Stockdale, amongst other American prisoners, led a resistance group against the North Vietnamese, facing torture, isolation, and starvation in attempts to break their wills. Meanwhile, back in America, Stockdale's wife, Sybil, begins working with other POW wives to try to get information on their husbands and to inform the world on their treatment.

== Cast ==
- James Woods as James Stockdale
- Jane Alexander as Sybil Stockdale
- Concetta Tomei as Doyen Salsig
- Richard McKenzie as Boroughs
- James Pax as Rabbit
- Haing S. Ngor as Major Bui
- Jon Cedar as Bud Salsig
- Sally Klein as Allison Decker
- Stephen Dorff as Stan Stockdale (age 9)
- Lillian Lehman as News Anchorwoman
- Lou Fant as Sidney Bailey
- Leo Geter as Mike Haggerty
- Raymond Ma as Pig Eye
- Steven Vincent Leigh as Big Ugh
- James Lashly as Chaplain
- George Milan - Averell Harriman
- Christopher Michael Moore - Intelligence
- Brad Finefrock - Sid Stockdale (age 10)
- Christian Hoff - Sid Stockdale (age 18)
- Jamie McEnnan - Stan Stockdale (age 6)
- Christian Jacobs - Jimmy Stockdale (age 14)
- Matt Graber - Taylor Stockdale (age 10)
- John Posey - Pasquarelli

== Background ==
The film stars James Woods as James B. 'Jim' Stockdale and Jane Alexander as Sybil Stockdale. Others in the film include Concetta Tomei as Doyen Salsig, Haing S. Ngor as Major Bui, and Jon Cedar as Bud Salsig.

Reportedly, the film's original broadcast had 45 million viewers.

The film was nominated for a Golden Globe in 1988, for James Woods under the category "Best Performance by an Actor in a Mini-Series or Motion Picture Made for TV".

In the Stockdale's own book In Love and War: The Story of a Family's Ordeal and Sacrifice During the Vietnam Years, a 1990 Naval Institute Press updated edition featured a quote each from Woods and Alexander on the book and the Stockdale's story. Woods was quoted "Heroes are hard to come by these days. When they exist there are those who inspire us with their quiet fortitude. Jim and Sybil do both." Alexander was quoted "One of the finest stories of a true marriage ever told."

== Release ==
The film first aired on March 16, 1987, on the National Broadcasting Company Network. It was released in America on VHS via Vidmark Entertainment, and in 1992 via StarMaker Entertainment, Inc. Lions Gate Home Entertainment released a VHS version on May 17, 1993. It was also released on Laserdisc. The only American DVD release was on November 16, 2009, via FremantleMedia. In the UK it was released on DVD twice; on 11 August 2003 via Consolidated and on 11 September 2006 via Boulevard Entertainment Ltd.

In Germany, the film's Cinema VHS release was re-titled P.O.W. - Prisoner of War. The film was also released on VHS in the Netherlands via Dutch FilmWorks (DFW) in 2000, and the company released a DVD version in 2007. Globo Vídeo released the film on VHS in Brazil. The film made its first showing in Greece on Aquarius TV in 2001.

== Critical reception ==
Sandra Brennan of Allmovie gave the film two and a half out of five stars.

John J. O'Connor of the New York Times reviewed the film on March 16, 1987, essentially giving an unfavorable rating, stating "The film - directed by Paul Aaron for Tisch/Avnet Productions - shuttles between the American prisoner in North Vietnam and his distraught wife back home, and the effect creates two stories that rarely seem connected. Mr. Woods, a fine actor who has been nominated for an Academy Award for Salvador and will undoubtedly get an Emmy nomination for Promise, is harrowingly persuasive in the prison scenes (one of his interrogators is played by Dr. Haing S. Ngor of The Killing Fields). And Ms. Alexander is quietly effective. But neither actor is served well by the fuzzy script, and when they do get to play a few brief scenes together, Mr. Woods and Ms. Alexander convey the unfortunate impression that they have just met in passing on the set. They do not make a very credible husband and wife. But then this version of In Love and War is not very credible on several levels."

Also on March 16, 1987, Jeff Jarvis of People magazine wrote a review of the film under the "Picks and Pans Review" section of the magazine issue, giving the film an A grade, stating "Not since Friendly Fire have I seen a movie that so effectively portrays the tragic pain and folly of Vietnam — and does so without a single battle scene. A spectacular story superbly told."

On the day of the film's original American broadcast, Daniel Ruth of the Chicago Sun-Times gave a favorable review, stating "With marvelous performances from Woods, Alexander and Ngor, "In Love and War" may be another unpleasant reminder of one of our darker chapters." In a 1991 Chicago Sun-Times review by Mary Houlihan-Skilton, the author gave a positive review, stating "In Love and War James Woods delivers a riveting performance as Cmdr. Jim Stockdale, who holds the dubious honor of being the longest-held American POW during the Vietnam War. With Jane Alexander and Haing S. Ngor, this is a disturbing, intense drama."

In the 1995 book Vietnam at 24 Frames a Second by Jeremy M. Devine, the author spoke of the film, stating "The made-for-television features had also become sources of tape cassettes. Broadcast for the previous calendar year, In Love and War was such a release. Despite a stellar cast including James Woods, Jane Alexander, and Haing S. Ngor, this Paul Aaron-directed feature was rather flat."

In the 2009 book Encyclopedia of Television Film Directors Volume 1 by Jerry Roberts, the section of director Paul Aaron stated "The director added adroitly to the Vietnam War cannon with In Love and War, which dramatized - via James Woods' exceptional portrayal - U.S. pilot Jim Stockdale's imprisonment for eight years in the prisoner-of-war camp known as the Hanoi Hilton."
