= Concetta Tomei =

American actress (born 1945)

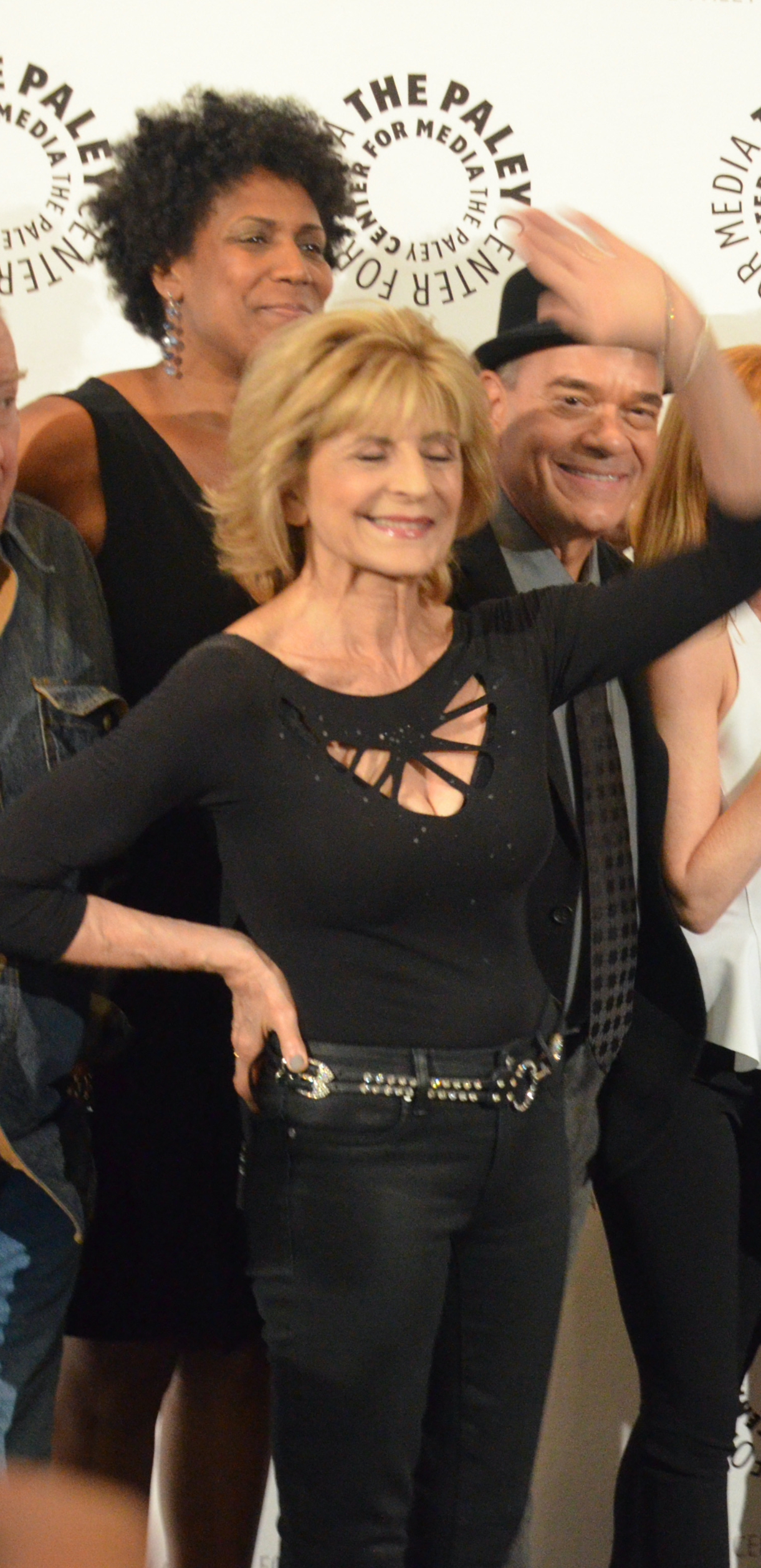
- Tomei in 2013
- Born: December 30, 1945 (age 80); Kenosha, Wisconsin, U.S.
- Education: University of Wisconsin–Madison (BA); Art Institute of Chicago (BFA)
- Years active: 1971–present

Concetta Tomei (born December 30, 1945) is an American actress. She is known for her roles as Major Lila Garreau on the ABC drama series China Beach (1988–1991) and as Lynda Hansen on the NBC medical drama series Providence (1999–2002).

== Early life and education ==
Tomei was born in Kenosha, Wisconsin. She earned a degree in education from the University of Wisconsin–Madison and worked four years as a teacher before deciding to pursue her love of theatre at the Goodman School of Drama at the Art Institute of Chicago (now at DePaul University). She earned a BFA and moved to Houston, Texas, where she worked for the Alley Theatre for two years before moving to New York City. In the Milwaukee area, she studied at Sunset Playhouse with Alan Furlan.

== Career ==
Tomei appeared in the original cast of several pioneering Off-Broadway productions, including Caryl Churchill's Cloud Nine and Larry Kramer's The Normal Heart. She appeared opposite Kevin Kline in the New York Shakespeare Festival's Richard III (winning New York's Bayfield Shakespearean award for her performance) and starred with David Bowie in the Broadway production of The Elephant Man, continuing in the national tour.

In the 1980s, she moved to California and appeared in many regional theatres, including Los Angeles' Mark Taper Forum, the Oregon Contemporary Theatre, and San Francisco's ACT. She was a regular cast member in the TV-series China Beach, which ran from 1988 to 1991. She was also in the cast of the short-lived Madman of the People (1994–95). She appeared in recurring roles in several TV series, including L.A. Law, Falcon Crest, Picket Fences, Max Headroom, and Judging Amy. In 1991 and 1994, Tomei guest appeared in Season 3 Episode 10 of the TV sitcom Wings titled "The Late Mrs. Biggins” and Season 5 Episode 21, titled “Roy Crazy”; in both episodes, she played the former wife of Roy Biggins. She starred in the 1992 miniseries The Burden of Proof. In 1997, she portrayed Minister Odala in Star Trek: Voyager episode "Distant Origin".

She appeared in such television series as 7th Heaven, Touched by an Angel, Second Time Around, The King of Queens, Weeds, Numb3rs, Kitchen Confidential, The Closer, Cold Case, Ghost Whisperer, Nip/Tuck, Rubicon, Necessary Roughness, and Star Trek: Voyager. She appeared in 63 episodes of the NBC television series Providence. In 2005, she appeared in an episode of The King of Queens. In 2017, she appeared in two episodes of The Mick titled "The Grandparents" & "The Matriarch" as Tippy Pemberton, the twisted, abusive grandmother of Sabrina, Chip and Ben.

In 2006, she returned to Off-Broadway with an acclaimed performance in Sarah Ruhl's The Clean House. In 2007, she appeared opposite Kevin Kline and Jennifer Garner in a Broadway production of the play Cyrano de Bergerac, which was also recorded and broadcast on PBS's Great Performances in 2009.

She played "Mrs. Crandell" in the cult film Don't Tell Mom the Babysitter's Dead (1991). She also appeared in the films Murder in Three Acts (1986), The Betty Ford Story (1987) and In Love and War (1987).

== Filmography ==
=== Film ===
Year	Title	Role
1991	Don't Tell Mom the Babysitter's Dead	Mom
1993	Twenty Bucks	Sam's Mother
1993	The Goodbye Bird	Miss Van Borins / Doris
1997	Out to Sea	Madge
1998	Deep Impact	Patricia Ruiz
1999	The Muse	Nurse Rennert
2002	Purpose	Lily Elias
2003	View from the Top	Mrs. Stewart
2007	The List	Ms. Fitch
2018	Reach	Doris

=== Television ===
Year	Title	Role	Notes
1982	ABC Afterschool Special	Mrs. Mixner	Episode: "Amy & the Angel"
1985	Doubletake	Hazel Carter	Miniseries
1986	Dynasty	Ilene	Episode: "The Warning"
1986	Falcon Crest	Dr. Estelle Kramer	6 episodes
1986	Murder in Three Acts	Janet Crisp	Television film
1986	My Sister Sam	Mrs. Trager	Episode: "Teacher's Pet"
1987	The Betty Ford Story	Jan	Television film
1987	In Love and War	Doyen Salsig	Television film
1987–1988	Max Headroom	Blank Dominique	Recurring role
1988	St. Elsewhere	Elise Praeger	Episode: "Final Cut"
1988–1991	China Beach	Maj. Lila Garreau	Main cast
1990, 1992	CBS Schoolbreak Special	Elizabeth Henderson	2 episodes
1990–1993	L.A. Law	Susan Hauber	5 episodes
1991, 1994	Wings	Silvia	2 episodes
1992	The Burden of Proof	Clara Stern	2 episodes
1992	Sisters	Diana Gottfried	Episode: "Crimes and Ms. Demeanors"
1992–1994	Picket Fences	Ellen McGrath	4 episodes
1993	Civil Wars	ADA Antonia Lecari	Episode: "Alien Aided Affection"
1994	Sin & Redemption	Marina Preston	Television film
1994	Birdland	Elizabeth	Episode: "Lower Than the Angels"
1994	Diagnosis: Murder	Sister Regina	Episode: "Sister Michael Wants You"
1994–1995	Madman of the People	Delia Buckner	Main cast
1995	Kirk	Sabrina	Episode: "Educating Kirk"
1995	The Client	Honey Dupree	Episode: "The Prodigal Father"
1996	Touched by an Angel	Kate Carpenter	Episode: "'Til We Meet Again"
1996	Ellen	Professor Bass	Episode: "Witness"
1996	Murder One	Jeanette Rennick	Episode: "Chapter Eighteen"
1997	Star Trek: Voyager	Minister Odala	Episode: "Distant Origin"
1997, 1998	Murphy Brown	Doris Dial	2 episodes
1999–2002	Providence	Lynda Hansen	Main cast
2003	Judging Amy	Joanne Collins	2 episodes
2004	7th Heaven	Mrs. Hampton	Episode: "Major League"
2005	Second Time Around	Christia	Episode: "The Dinner Party"
2005	Gone But Not Forgotten	Rita	Television film
2005	The King of Queens	Joyce	Episode: "Catching Hell"
2005	Weeds	Celia's Mother – Pat	Episode: "Higher Education"
2006	Numbers	Dr. Sarah Kemple	Episode: "Protest"
2006	Kitchen Confidential	Grace	Episode: "An Affair to Remember"
2006	The Closer	Mrs. Rawley	Episode: "The Other Woman"
2008	Cold Case	Violet Golding	Episode: "Wednesday's Women"
2008	Ghost Whisperer	Margaret	Episode: "Imaginary Friends and Enemies"
2008	Great Performances	Roxane's Duenna	Episode: "Cyrano de Bergerac"
2010	Nip/Tuck	Maureen Ayers	Episode: "Christian Troy II"
2010	Rubicon	Georgina Brant	2 episodes
2011–2013	Necessary Roughness	Angela	Recurring role
2016	Veep	Connie DiBenedetto	Episode: "Congressional Ball"
2017	The Mick	Tippy Pemberton / Evelyn	2 episodes
2019	Arrested Development	Mrs. Livingston	Episode: "Saving for Arraignment Day"
2019	Abby's	Nemo	Episode: "Rosie's Band"
2020	Space Force	Rep. Pitosi	2 episodes
2022	Going Home	Fay Hutton	Episode #1.4
2026	Elsbeth	Lorena Marchuk	season 3 episode 19 "Catch and Kill"
