= Steven Vincent Leigh =

American actor

- Occupation: Television actor

Steven Vincent Leigh (born 10 August 1964) is an American actor and martial artist. He had a recurring role as Wei-Lee Young in the NBC soap opera Sunset Beach. In 1987 he appeared in the film In Love and War. In 1991 he appeared in the film Ring of Fire. He appeared in the 1996 Star Trek: Deep Space Nine episode "For the Cause" as security officer Lieutenent Reese.

== Filmography ==
=== Film ===
Year	Title	Role	Notes
1989	China White	Danny Chow	
1990	Vietnam, Texas	Andy	
1991	Ring of Fire	Terry Woo	
1992	Deadly Bet	Rico	
1993	To Be the Best	Hong Do	Direct-to-video
1994	Death Match	Mr. Han	
1994	Sword of Honor	Johnny	Direct-to-video, also associate producer
1995	Midnight Man	Tango	
1996	Prey of the Jaguar	Kenichi Tanaka	Direct-to-video
2002	Redemption	Steve "Dog" Wu	Direct-to-video

=== Television ===
Year	Title	Role	Notes
1985	General Hospital	Kim Soong Wu	
1987	In Love and War	Big Ugh	Television film
1988	Noble House	John Chen	2 episodes
1990	Hunter	Tun Duk	Episode: "A Snitch'll Break Your Heart"
1991	Deadly Game	Chang	Television film
1993	The Commish	Ken Aoki	Episode: "Rising Sun"
1994	The Byrds of Paradise	Glen	Episode: "The Secret Life of Underpants"
1996	Star Trek: Deep Space Nine	Lt. Reese	Episode: "For the Cause"
1997	Sunset Beach	Wei-Lee Yung	
1998	Nash Bridges	Happy Ching	Episode: "Crossfire"
1999	Beverly Hills, 90210	Jason Chang	Episode: "Local Hero"
2000	Relic Hunter	Li Feng	Episode: "Three Rivers to Cross"
