= Catfish in Black Bean Sauce =

- DVD cover art
- Directed by: Chi Muoi Lo
- Written by: Chi Muoi Lo
- Produced by: Chi Muoi Lo
- Starring: Chi Muoi Lo; Paul Winfield; Sanaa Lathan; Mary Alice
- Cinematography: Rudy M. Fenenga, Jr. Dean Lent
- Edited by: Dawn Hoggatt
- Music by: Stanley A. Smith
- Distributed by: Black Hawk Entertainment
- Release date: June 9, 2000
- Running time: 119 minutes
- Country: United States
- Language: English

Catfish in Black Bean Sauce is a 2000 comedy-drama film directed by Chi Muoi Lo in his directorial debut about a Vietnamese brother and sister raised by an African American couple. The film stars Chi Muoi Lo, Paul Winfield, Sanaa Lathan, and Mary Alice. Music Supervision was performed by Tony Scott Zubia (Platinum One Entertainment).

== Cast ==
- Chi Muoi Lo as Dwayne Williams/Sap
- Sanaa Lathan as Nina
- Paul Winfield as Harold Williams
- Mary Alice as Dolores Williams
- Lauren Tom as Mai
- Kieu Chinh as Thanh
- Tyler Christopher as Michael
- Tzi Ma as Vinh
- George Wallace as James
- Wing Chen as Samantha
- Amy Tran as Young Mai
- Kevin Lo as Young Dwayne/Sap
- Kevin D’Arcy as Guard 1
- Andre Rosey Brown: Guard 2
- Ron Galbraith as Doctor
- Calvin Nguyen as Teacher
- Richard F. Whiten as Motorcycle Cop
- Lalanya Master as Bank Teller
- Mark Daniel Cade as Assistant Bank Manager
- Jedda Jones as Agnes
- Roxanne Reese as Nadine
- Saachiko Magwili as Mother
- William Thomas as Douglas
- April Tran as Interpreter
- Thomas Ryan as Lt. Davis
- Carol Kiernan as Nurse
- Thu Hong: Opera Singer
- Ho Lo as Man at Airport
- Vien Hong as Transvestite

== Reviews ==
The film has received mixed reviews. A Los Angeles Times review noted that as the film's writer/director/actor Chi Muoi Lo "spread himself too thin, resulting in an uneven picture but one that has plenty of substance and emotion". Roger Ebert wrote that the film was "a first draft for a movie that could have been extraordinary". The San Francisco Chronicle noted that the film was "a comedy of interracial wariness and misunderstanding marked by a refreshing lack of sappiness".

== Awards and nominations ==
Year	Award	Result	Category	Recipient
2001	First Americans in the Arts Awards	Won	Outstanding Performance by an Actor in a Supporting Role (Film)	Tyler Christopher
2001	Political Film Society	Nominated	Exposé	-
1999	Florida Film Festival New Port Beach Film Festival	Won Won Won	Best Narrative Feature	Chi Muoi Lo
1999	Florida Film Festival New Port Beach Film Festival	Won Won Won	Best Narrative Feature Best Screen Play	Chi Muoi Lo Chi Muoi Lo
1999	WorldFest-Houston International Film Festival	Won	Theatrical Feature Films - 004	Chi Muoi Lo
