= Chan Sarun =

Cambodian politician (1948–2026)

- ច័ន្ទ សារុន

Minister of Agriculture, Forestry and Fisheries
- In office 30 November 1998 – 23 September 2013
- Prime Minister: Hun Sen
- Succeeded by: Ouk Rabun

Member of Parliament for Takéo
- In office 27 September 2003 – 31 August 2026

Personal details
- Born: 18 March 1948 Cambodia, French Indochina
- Died: 31 August 2026 (aged 78) Phnom Penh, Cambodia
- Party: Cambodian People's Party
- Relations: Haing S. Ngor (older brother); Chang My-Huoy (sister-in-law)
- Education: Chonnam National University (Hon. Ph.D. in Agriculture, 2007)

Chan Sarun (also known as Ngor Hong Srun; Khmer: ច័ន្ទ សារុន, Chinese: 吳和順; 18 March 1948 – 31 August 2026) was a Cambodian politician who served as the Minister of Agriculture, Forestry and Fisheries. He belonged to the Cambodian People's Party and was elected to represent Takeo Province in the National Assembly of Cambodia in 2003. The younger brother of the late Cambodian-American actor Haing S. Ngor, and also the brother-in-law of the late Chang My-Huoy, Chan is the son of an ethnic Chinese father and a Khmer mother, with ancestry from the Hakka of Meizhou.

Sarun died on 31 August 2026, at the age of 78.
