= The Monkey King (miniseries) =

2001 American television mini-series by Peter MacDonald

- Also known as: The Lost Empire
- Based on: Journey to the West by Wu Cheng'en
- Written by: David Henry Hwang
- Directed by: Peter MacDonald
- Starring: Thomas Gibson; Bai Ling; Russell Wong
- Composer: John Altman
- Country of origin: United States
- No. of episodes: 2

Production
- Executive producers: Robert Halmi Sr. Robert A. Halmi; Tomas Krejci
- Producer: Steve Harding
- Cinematography: David Connell
- Editor: Colin Green
- Running time: 153 minutes
- Production companies: Hallmark Entertainment; RTL

Original release
- Network: NBC
- Release: March 11 – March 12, 2001

The Monkey King, also known as The Lost Empire, is a 2001 television miniseries produced by NBC and the SciFi Channel. It is a contemporary take on the classic 16th-century novel Journey to the West. It stars Bai Ling, Thomas Gibson, Russell Wong, Eddie Marsan, and Randall Duk Kim. The miniseries was directed by Peter MacDonald and written by Asian American dramatist David Henry Hwang.

== Plot ==
Nicholas Orton (played by Thomas Gibson) is an American businessman who has lived in China for several years. He has a chance encounter with a beautiful Chinese lady (played by Bai Ling) who says that he is the only one who can save the world from reverting five-hundred years. He is unswayed by this until many modern buildings begin disappearing before his eyes. This mystical lady (revealed later as Guanyin, the bodhisattva of compassion) transports him to a portal which offers entrance, through the teachings of Confucius (played by Ric Young), to the ancient Chinese underworld.

When Orton (soon to be named The Scholar From Above) reaches the other side of the portal, he finds that his studies of Confucius will come in handy for the path that lies ahead. Orton's first action is to rescue Sun Wukong, the Monkey King, from the mountain in which he has been imprisoned for centuries. Wukong travels with Orton in his quest to save the original manuscript of Journey to the West from retroactive destruction; if the story itself is erased from history, all the people who were ever inspired by the lessons it teaches will be worse off, and history will permanently change for the poorer. They are later joined by Zhu Bajie (Pigsy) and Sha Wujing (Friar Sand) to help them on their way.

== Reception ==
Robert Bianco of USA Today called it "silly and confused." Variety called it "tedious" and said "all the strong technical work comes across as the outer shell of an empty nut."

The ratings for the miniseries were poor; it recorded one of the lowest ratings ever for a miniseries on NBC. Critics said it was due to oversaturation of special-effects-driven miniseries dropping in popularity.

== Release ==
The film is available on DVD and videocassette. There was also a novelization of the miniseries by Kathryn Wesley released under the title The Monkey King.
