= Jason Leland Adams =

American actor and scenic designer (born 1963)

- Born: Jason Leland Adams; August 18, 1963 (age 62); Washington, D.C., United States
- Occupations: actor, designer, scenic designer
- Children: 3 children
- Awards: Helen Hayes Award; Source Award
- Website: aluminadesign.com bootlegtheater.org

Jason Leland Adams (born February 7, 1963) is an American actor and scenic designer based in Los Angeles. He is perhaps best known for his roles as Preston A. Lodge III, on the television series Dr. Quinn Medicine Woman and a lead role in Vanishing Son.

== Biography ==
=== Early life ===
Jason was born in Washington, D.C. Before becoming involved with acting and theater, he made his living as a builder and furniture maker

=== Career ===
Jason has performed in, designed, and/or produced more than 60 plays in regional theaters around the country, including REDCAT, the Mark Taper Forum, Arena Stage, the Seattle Rep, the San Jose Rep, Actors' Gang, Ensemble Studio Theatre, Naked Angels, Source Theater, the Washington Shakespeare Company and the Evidence Room. He is a former Artistic Director of the Washington Shakespeare Company; during his tenure with the company, he produced six shows that garnered two Helen Hayes Awards and six nominations. He was also the 1991 recipient of the Source Award for his performance in the title role of Don Juan of Seville.

In 1994, together with Bart DeLorenzo, Alicia Hoge and Ames Ingham, Jason founded the theater - Evidence Room. For the theater, Jason worked with direction, set design and acting. In December 2005, his 7-year old daughter, Isabelle, joined the costume team. In 2006 Jason expanded the theater, so that it would house a new one - Bootleg. The former Evidence Room was moved to another location in LA and was no longer officially associated with Jason.

Jason is a member of United Scenic Artists/IATSE Local 829. A labor union and professional association of Designers, Artists and Craftspeople, organized to protect craft standards, working conditions and wages for the entertainment and decorative arts industries.

Jason also runs a fabrication/design firm for architects and environmental designers.

=== Dr. Quinn Medicine Woman ===
In early 1994, Jason landed a role as General Custer on the hit television series Dr. Quinn Medicine Woman. In 1995 he became a regular cast member, portraying the character of Preston A. Lodge III, which he portrayed until the series cancellation in 1998.

The role of Preston A. Lodge III was originally intended for the Australian X-Men actor Hugh Jackman; however, several circumstances caused a change of plans.

Before the cancellation in 1998, a seventh season of the show was planned. Jason has revealed that, after his character went bankrupt, he was meant to have a storyline involving his Bostonian father sending him a mail-order bride.

The second lead actor on Dr. Quinn, Joe Lando, stated through a DVD audio commentary that he and Jason and his family are and remain very good friends as of 2003.

=== In other media ===
In 1995, Jason starred as Agent Dan Sandler on the action series Vanishing Son, which ran as a part of Universal Television's Action Pack in first-run syndication.

After the 1998 cancellation of Dr. Quinn, Medicine Woman, Jason guest-starred in the science fiction television series Star Trek: Deep Space Nine during season 7, in the episode entitled "Covenant", where he portrayed the character of Benyan. He co-starred together with the then 25-year-old actress Maureen Flannigan, who portrayed Benyan's wife Mika.

The characters of Benyan and Mika also appeared in the DS9 novel: Mission - Gamma: "Cathedral", published October 2002.

In 1999 Jason played the part as the bartender in the short film Weeping Shriner, written & directed by William Preston Robertson. Adams starred alongside fellow Dr. Quinn star Geoffrey Lower, who played the lead role in the film, which can be described as a comedy about depression. It was Geoffrey Lower's wife Karen Severin, who produced the short film.

=== Personal life ===
Jason has three children, born 1998 (Isabelle), 2001 (Max), and 2007 (Alice).

== Filmography ==
Year	Film	Role	Notes
1994	Dr. Quinn, Medicine Woman	General George Custer/Preston A. Lodge III	Appeared in six episodes as Custer in 1994 and 1995. Appeared in 53 episodes as Preston, 1995–1998
1995	Vanishing Son	Agent Dan Sandler (lead)	TV series, second lead role
1996	Black & White: A Love Story	Mick (lead)	Award-winning feature by Susanna Lo
1998	Star Trek: Deep Space Nine, Episode: Covenant	Benyan	TV series episode
1999	Weeping Shriner	Bartender	Short by William Preston Robertson
