= Ring of Fire (1991 martial arts film) =

- Directed by: Richard W. Munchkin
- Written by: Jake Jacobs; Richard W. Munchkin
- Produced by: Charla Driver; Richard Pepin; Joseph Merhi
- Starring: Don "The Dragon" Wilson; Maria Ford; Vince Murdocco; Dale Jacoby; Michael DeLano; Eric Lee; Steven Vincent Leigh; Gary Daniels; Ron Yuan
- Cinematography: Richard Pepin
- Edited by: Geraint Bell; John Weidner
- Music by: John Gonzalez
- Production company: PM Entertainment Group
- Distributed by: FilmRise
- Release date: December 18, 1991
- Running time: 100 minutes
- Country: United States
- Language: English

Ring of Fire is a 1991 martial arts film directed by Richard W. Munchkin, starring Don "The Dragon" Wilson as the protagonist. The film also stars Maria Ford, Gary Daniels, Eric Lee, Steven Vincent Leigh and Ron Yuan. The main theme of the film is love between two people whose families are at war with each other (essentially a modern take on Romeo and Juliet). This theme is symbolized throughout the film by a fortune cookie message with the words "Like a mountain lily, love grows on rocky terrain".

== Plot ==
Johnny Woo, a doctor from Chinatown, meets Julie at his aunt's restaurant, when Julie mistakes him for a waiter. The two instantly fall in love and from this moment their fates are sealed. Unfortunately, Julie's boyfriend Chuck and her brother Brad from Little Italy are fighting a gang war with Chinatown, and this presents a major obstacle to Johnny and Julie's relationship. Before long, Julie breaks up with Chuck, but this only causes more trouble. Eventually, a fight is arranged to finally decide the victor in the gang war, to be fought Thai-style with broken glass in a ring of fire. The outcome is tragedy. Relentlessly goaded by Brad and Chuck, Johnny finally agrees to fight Brad in a boxing ring. Faced with defeat, Brad and Chuck reveal themselves as the cowards they really are.

== Cast ==
- Don "The Dragon" Wilson as Johnny Woo
- Maria Ford as Julie
- Vince Murdocco as Chuck
- Dale Jacoby as Brad
- Steven Vincent Leigh as Terry
- Michael DeLano as Lopez
- Eric Lee as Kwong
- Jane Chung as Aunt Mei
- Shirley Jacobs as Julie's Grandmother
- Marta Merrifield as Wendy
- Gary Daniels as Bud
- Shaun Shimoda as Cho
- Ron Yuan as Li
