= Eat a Bowl of Tea =

Book by Louis Chu

- First edition
- Author: Louis Chu
- Publisher: Lyle Stuart
- Publication date: 1961
- Pages: 250 pp.
- ISBN: 978-0-295-95607-7
- OCLC: 444846003

Eat a Bowl of Tea is a 1961 novel by American writer Louis Chu. Because of its portrayal of the "bachelor society" in New York's Chinatown after World War II, it has become an important work in Asian American studies. It has been cited as an influence by such authors as Frank Chin and Maxine Hong Kingston. It was made into a film of the same name by Wayne Wang in 1989.

The novel focuses on four primary characters: a young married couple, Ben Loy and Mei Oi, and their fathers, Wah Gay and Lee Gong. Chu uses their stories to illuminate conflicts between Chinese ideals and traditions and contemporary American society.

== Explanation of the novel's title ==
The phrase "Eat a Bowl of Tea" plays on the fact that the Chinese character 吃, most commonly used to mean "eat," can also mean "drink" in Cantonese, Mandarin, and other Chinese languages. To somebody who is not fluent, the phrase "吃一碗茶" sounds like "Eat a Bowl of Tea." The title of the novel comes into play when Ben Loy takes the initiative to ask a Chinese herb specialist, Dr. Suey, if he has anything that would cure his impotence. The doctor responds, "Eat a bowl of tea and we'll get you on the way to recovery" (244). Although the tea is "thick, black, bitter...[and] not easy to swallow" (246), Ben Loy "kept going back to the herb doctor uncomplainingly" (246). Whether it is the beneficial effect of the tea or a change in Ben Loy himself, Ben Loy regains his manhood at the conclusion of the novel.

== Plot summary ==
Eat a Bowl of Tea begins by describing newlyweds Ben Loy and Mei Oi sleeping peacefully in their bed in New York City. They are abruptly awakened by a prostitute ringing the doorbell. Ben Loy, ashamed of his pre-marital history with prostitutes, lies to protect his secret from his "innocent, pure" wife.

The story then jumps backwards several months to the "Money Come" gambling house and the men who spend their days there: Wah Gay, Lee Gong, Chong Loo and Ah Song. The text depicts the close friendship between Wah Gay and Lee Gong (both Chinese immigrants with wives back in Guangdong (Canton)), and a conversation concerning their unmarried children ensues. Upon learning that Wah Gay has a marriageable son (Ben Loy) here in the States, Lee Gong spies on him at his restaurant and decides that he is the right man for his daughter (Mei Oi), who is still in China. He and Wah Gay decide that Ben Loy will go to China and bring back Mei Oi as his bride. The two men write their wives (Lau Shee and Jung Shee) in anticipation.

Although Ben Loy seems to be the epitome of a "good boy," he has a secret life. When he is not busy working at the restaurant (in the fictional suburb of Stanton, Connecticut), he and his roommate Chin Yuen visit white prostitutes in New York City, a habit Ben Loy picked up while serving in the Army during World War II. Ben Loy becomes addicted to these sexual flings, often having sex with numerous prostitutes in a night. Without the permission of his father – who wants Ben Loy to stay in Stanton, away from the temptations of New York – Ben Loy and Chin Yuen move to an apartment on Manhattan's Catherine Street.

When Wah Gay approaches Ben Loy about going to Sunwei, China to find a bride, Ben Loy is skeptical and unwilling. But he eventually warms to the idea of bringing a bride with him back to America and raising a family, and he assents to his family's wish. When he meets Mei Oi in China, he decides that he made the right decision – he is immediately enthralled by her beauty and pleased by her modesty and courtesy. After such ceremonial practices as the employment of matchmakers and the approval of the Fourth Uncle, the families plan a traditional wedding. Their Chinese wedding is mirrored by a Chinese wedding banquet back in Chinatown.

Her arrival in New York should be a happy time for Mei Oi, as she is finally able to meet her father and to experience life in a big city. However, she feels lonely in the city and spends her days sobbing over her deteriorating marriage, not understanding the causes of Ben Loy's impotence. Although they had sex during their first few weeks of marriage, since their arrival in New York he no longer appears to desire her affection, even when she attempts to arouse him. This rejection deeply hurts, frustrates and confuses Mei Oi, and she concludes that Ben Loy no longer loves her. It is not long before the novelty of living in Chinatown and marrying a gimshunhock ("Gold Mountain sojourner"—someone living in America) wears off. Mei Oi insists that Ben Loy consult a doctor about his impotency – he tries both an American doctor and a Chinese herb specialist, but to no avail.

In July, an unexpected visitor appears at their apartment: Ah Song, a frequent Money Come guest who flirts shamelessly with Mei Oi while Ben Loy is at work, claiming to be deeply in love with her and divulging Ben Loy's secret shameful past. Confused and overpowered, Mei Oi is raped by Ah Song. In spite of the rape, they kindle a relationship and a secret affair begins.

Mei Oi soon discovers that she is pregnant, but does not know who the father is (since she and Ben Loy had successfully had sex during a visit to Washington, D.C.). She continues her affair with Ah Song, oblivious to the increasing gossip that she is "knitting Ben Loy a green hat" – having sex with another man. Eventually Soon Lee Gong, Wah Gay, and finally Ben Loy learn of the affair. The tong mocks the family and Mei Oi realizes the magnitude of shame she has brought upon them.

The neighborhood eventually assumes the identity of the man as Ah Song, and Ben Loy and Mei Oi move to Stanton to avoid further embarrassment. Even the affections of Chin Yuen, Ben Loy's closest companion, cannot distract Mei Oi from the pain she feels away from Ah Song, and she eventually convinces Ben Loy to move back to New York.

Back in the old apartment, the affair resumes right where it left off. Wah Gay, crazed by the shame this affair has brought upon his family, lurks near the apartment and attacks Ah Song as he leaves, slicing off his ear. When Ah Song presses charges, Wah Gay flees to a friend's home in New Jersey. However, because he is so well-connected in his tong through multitudes of devoted and powerful family members, he is not penalized for his actions. Ah Song, on the other hand, is exiled for five years. But Wah Gay and Lee Gong are too embarrassed to remain in the community and leave New York, heading their separate ways in solitude.

Ben Loy and Mei Oi decide to free themselves of all family and community ties by starting anew in San Francisco. The birth of their child, Kuo Ming, and a new environment allow them to grow closer and mend previous wrongs. Ben Loy visits another Chinese herb specialist and decides to take the doctor's advice and "eat a bowl of tea" to treat his impotence. Whether it is the herbs or the increase in Ben Loy's independence, his masculinity is finally restored in all senses of the word.

== Major characters ==
In order of prevalence and importance:

=== Central Characters ===
- Wang Ben Loy

Ben Loy is the husband of Mei Oi and the son of Wah Gay and Lau Shee. The novel begins when Ben Loy is in his 20s and occupying himself by serving at a restaurant in Stanton and making frequent trips to New York to sleep with various prostitutes. After he marries Mei Oi, he finds himself impotent. This, combined with the humiliation and pain he feels at the discovery of his wife's affair, burdens him with shame and self-doubt. Forgiving, caring, and loving, the text consistently portrays Ben Loy as the "good guy" who is merely plagued by the mistakes of his youth.

- Lee Mei Oi

Mei Oi is the stunningly beautiful wife of Ben Loy and the daughter of Lee Gong and Jung Shee, still living in Sunwei, China, Others admire Mei Oi for her comely appearance and her level of education, as schooling for women was rare in her circumstances. Frustrated and hurt by Ben Loy's impotence, Mei Oi disregards the pressures and standards of family and society in order to express herself sexually through her lover, Ah Song. Although Mei Oi transforms negatively throughout the course of the novel – from a sweet, innocent rural girl to a selfish seductress – she reverts to her pleasant characteristics at the conclusion of the novel.

- Wang Wah Gay

Wah Gay is Ben Loy's elderly father and Lau Shee's husband. Unable to bring his wife over due to immigration laws, Wah Gay spends his days maintaining his clubhouse, the "Money Come," which serves as the mahjong headquarters for the neighborhood men. Although he cares deeply for Ben Loy, the pressure and control he places upon him only drive him away. Wah Gay and his closest companion, Lee Gong, represent the older generation of Chinese immigrants who continue to idealize traditional values and customs while residing in contemporary America.

- Lee Gong

Lee Gong is Mei Oi's slight, elderly father and Jung Shee's husband. He harbors an extremely close bond with Wah Gay, as they traveled from China to America together and shared quarters at Ellis Island as teenagers. His playful and strategic personality impels him to devise a plan to arrange a marriage between Mei Oi and Ben Loy. Although he has a distant relationship from his wife and daughter in China, Lee Gong maintains high expectations for their behavior. Upon cultivating a relationship with Mei Oi, her unconventional behavior shames and disappoints him and he is unable to forgive his daughter for her devastating mistakes.

- Ah Song

Ah Song is a youthful-looking and handsome man in his mid-40s. He serves as the Don Juan and the "bad guy" (a foil to Ben Loy) of the story, and is known for his laziness and his reputation with women. Ah Song does not miss a beat when he meets the lovely Mei Oi, and proceeds to seduce the married woman (the first time, questionably by force). Mei Oi's thoughts reveal his true nature, as even the woman who loves him cannot take him seriously. Although she considers him a tender and understanding lover, she realizes that if Ben Loy leaves her, "the baby...would have no one to call father" (211), showing that Mei Oi does not view him as a responsible adult. Finally, the text characterizes Ah Song as the "lone wolf" (222) of the story – in a culture controlled by family ties and power, Ah Song does not have a relative to speak of.

=== Chinatown neighbors ===
- Chin Yuen

Chin Yuen is Ben Loy's longtime roommate in Stanton and the two men eventually become close friends. Chin Yuen introduces Ben Loy to the seductive world of New York and eventually gives Ben Loy and Mei Oi his apartment to share. Although Ben Loy describes him as a "carefree bachelor" (210) and as his closest friend with a "good heart" (59), he is unaware that Chin Yuen longs to cultivate a relationship with Mei Oi and fantasizes that he is the man she is having an affair with.

- Wang Wing Sim

Wing Sim is Eng Shee's husband and Ben Loy's cousin. Although Wing Sim and Ben Loy are far from close, he is protective of his cousin and goes out of his way to help Ben Loy in his time of need. By offering Ben Loy a job and reprimanding Eng Shee for ostracizing Mei Oi, Wing Sim proves to be a genuine and caring character and the most accepting member of Ben Loy's family.

- Eng Shee

Eng Shee is Wing Sim's wife. Although she came from the same rural background as Mei Oi, she is uneducated and snobbish to the point that her own husband states that she has a "limited knowledge of everything" (162) and possesses a "narrow point of view" (162). Her overtly rude treatment of Mei Oi reinforces these judgments.

- Wang Chuck Ting

Chuck Ting is Wah Gay's cousin and Wing Sim's father. Chuck Ting possesses an impressive amount of power in the business world, as he is the president of the Wang Association as well as numerous other businesses. Chuck Ting has a high regard for the protection and reputation of his family and flexes his power in order to free Wah Gay of consequences when he attacks Ah Song. Although Chuck Ting's actions are not necessarily just, the devotion he has for his family is prominent and admirable.

- Mee King

Mee King is an old friend of Wah Gay, as they attended Poy Ying Middle School and even visited whore houses (apparently this is quite the bonding activity!) together in their youth. Both friends are there for one another in their times of need (when Mee King was shot and when Wah Gay hides from the police) and the novel portrays Mee King as an understanding and reliable friend.

== Setting and historical context ==
The novel takes place in the 1940s, and is mainly set in New York's Chinatown.

Chu's novel begins right after the close of World War II. Numerous references are made to the Asian American soldiers represented by Ben Loy. After the war, many elderly men were confined to the cities of San Francisco, Seattle, Los Angeles, Boston, and New York City, as the 1882 Chinese Exclusion Act and Immigration Act of 1924 had prevented them from returning to their wives and family in China and also from bringing these family members to the United States. For this reason, many Chinatowns in the USA were "bachelor societies." The conflict of the novel arises from the repeal of the Exclusion Act in 1943, for Mei Oi could not have come to the States before then.

Another aspect of the novel is the effect of Chinese American men on life back in China. Chinese men who had emigrated to the United States were known as gimshunhocks, or "sojourner in Gold Mountain" from the Chinese name for America. These men were highly desirable husbands for young women in China, as is seen in Mei Oi's willingness to marry Ben Loy.

== Literary significance and reception ==
When the novel was first published in 1961, reviews denounced it, deeming the content offensive and the language "tasteless and raw" (2). Chu's work was ignored for a decade and finally rediscovered in the 1970s. It is now considered a primary work in Asian American literature, and Louis Chu has been praised repeatedly for creating an honest portrayal of Chinese American culture. Due to its influence and popularity, the Pan Asian Repertory Theatre in New York City produced the novel for the stage and Wayne Wang directed a film version in 1989.

=== Critical articles ===
1. Chen, Xiangyang. "Constructions of Chinese Identity in Eat a Bowl of Tea and Chinese Box." Re-Reading America: Changes and Challenges. Ed. Weihe Zhong and Rui Han; Cheltenham, England: Reardon; 2004. pp. 215–26
2. Chua, Cheng Lok; "Golden Mountain: Chinese Versions of the American Dream in Lin Yutang, Louis Chu, and Maxine Hong Kingston" Ethnic Groups 1982; 4 (1-2): 33–59.
3. Hsiao, Ruth Y. "Facing the Incurable: Patriarchy in Eat a Bowl of Tea." Reading the Literatures of Asian America. Ed. Shirley Geok-lin Lim and Amy Ling. Philadelphia: Temple UP; 1992. pp. 151–62
4. Li, Shu-yan; "Otherness and Transformation in Eat a Bowl of Tea and Crossings." MELUS 1993–1994 Winter; 18 (4): 99–110.
5. Ling, Jinqi; "Reading for Historical Specificities: Gender Negotiations in Louis Chu's Eat a Bowl of Tea." MELUS 1995 Spring; 20 (1): 35–51.
6. By: Oakes, Pamela J. "Filial Duty and Family Survival in Timothy Mo's The Monkey King and Sour Sweet." Bearing Dream, Shaping Visions: Asian Pacific American Perspectives. Ed. Linda A. Revilla, Gail M. Nomura, Shawn Wong and Shirley Hune. Pullman, WA: Washington State UP; 1993. pp. 141–52
7. Prigg, Benson Webster; Transactional Analysis: A Viable Approach for Discussing Human Autonomy in Fictional Texts Dissertation Abstracts International, 1991 Apr; 51 (10): 3414A. Bowling Green State U.
8. By: Shih, David. "Eat a Bowl of Tea by Louis Chu." A Resource Guide to Asian American Literature. Ed. Sau-ling Cynthia Wong and Stephen H. Sumida. New York, NY: Modern Language Association of America; 2001. pp. 45–53
