= Susanna Lo =

American film director

Susanna Lo (born February 20, 1966) is an American independent film director, writer and producer whose films include Black & White: A Love Story, Manson Girls and Alma of My Heart. Lo's films have been shown at the Berlinale, Montreal World Film Festival and the Torino Film Festival.

== Early life ==
Susanna Lo was born in Hong Kong and moved to Honolulu, Hawaii at the age of five. She was raised by a single father who was an undocumented worker until she was 12 when they became naturalized citizens. She went to Loyola Marymount University at 17 after receiving several scholarships to multiple colleges.

== Career ==
Lo started working for grass roots campaigns after college, initially working for Tom Hayden and Jane Fonda at Campaign California. She moved on to be a speech writer for Michael Dukakis' Presidential Campaign and for the California Democratic Party. Besides being an accomplished filmmaker, Lo is a novelist known for writing the international, best selling novel, Alma of My Heart. The film for this novel is currently shooting in Los Angeles.

== Films ==
In 1993, at the age of 26, Lo directed her first feature film, Black & White: A Love Story. This film went on to win seven international awards. Black & White: A Love Story is a part of a trilogy about controversial love that is followed by Alma of My Heart, a love story, and Delilah - A Love Story. Lo is also the director, writer and producer of Manson Girls.

== Mentorships ==
Lo has been mentoring underprivileged children on how to make films through PEN in the Classroom and FYI, Films by Youth Inside. She is currently developing an on-set film mentorship program for sex-trafficked and physically abused teenage girls with The Teen Project in Los Angeles.

== Awards ==
- 1996: Best Debut Film, Berlinale – Black & White: A Love Story
- 1996: Best First Feature Film, Montreal World Film Festival – Black & White: A Love Story
- 1996: Best Feature, Audience Award, Florida Film Festival – Black & White: A Love Story
- 1996: Film of Merit, Hong Kong Film Critics Award – Black & White: A Love Story
- 1996: Press Award, Paris Film Festival – Black & White: A Love Story
- 1997: Audience Award, Barcelona International Women's Film Festival - Largo
