= Jason William Adams =

American stage and voice-over actor

- Born: July 12, 1983 (age 42)
- Occupation(s): Actor, voice actor

Jason William Adams (born July 12, 1983) is an American stage and voice-over actor. Raised in Los Angeles, he attended Hamilton High School (Los Angeles) before attaining a degree in Fine Arts from the University of California, Santa Cruz. He is most recently known for his portrayal of Tom in Overtone Industries' new-age opera Songs & Dances of Imaginary Lands. Alongside cinematographer Adam Jaffe, he co-founded the multi-media production company Spontaneous Combustions. His work as a recording artist under the alias Sloppy J' highlights their projects.
