= The Iron Triangle (film) =

1989 film directed by Eric Weston

- Directed by: Eric Weston
- Produced by: Tony Scotti; Angela Schapiro; John A. Bushelman
- Starring: Beau Bridges; Haing S. Ngor; Liem Whatley; Johnny Hallyday
- Music by: Michael Lloyd; John D'Andrea; Nick Strimple
- Distributed by: Scotti Brothers Records; Artisan Entertainment; International Video Entertainment; MGM Home Entertainment
- Release date: 1989
- Running time: 91 minutes
- Country: United States
- Language: English

The Iron Triangle is a 1989 film about the Vietnam War shot in Sri Lanka and directed by Eric Weston.

The story is based on the diary of an unknown Viet Cong Soldier. This unique fact gives the movie a different perspective than many of the other movies about the Vietnam war and makes black and white distinctions about who were the "good guys" and "bad guys" a little more complicated. The film stars Beau Bridges, Haing S. Ngor, Liem Whatley, Johnny Hallyday, Jim Ishida, and Ping Wu. Each character helps bring to life the struggle of what it means to fight for one's country. Whether they be a teacher's son (Ho), a French mercenary (Jacques), or a simple soldier (Keene) these three men bring to light a gray view of war which reflects that there are many more sides to the war than just "good" or "evil".

== Cast ==
- Beau Bridges as Captain Keene, U.S. Army
- Liem Whatly as Ho, young Viet Cong soldier
- Haing S. Ngor as Captain Tuong, NVA
- Johnny Hallyday as Jacques, French soldier/guard
- François Chau as Captain Duc
- Jim Ishida as Khoi, upper level Viet Cong soldier
- Ping Wu as Pham, Ho's best friend and young Viet Cong soldier
