= Chi Muoi Lo =

American actor (born 1976)

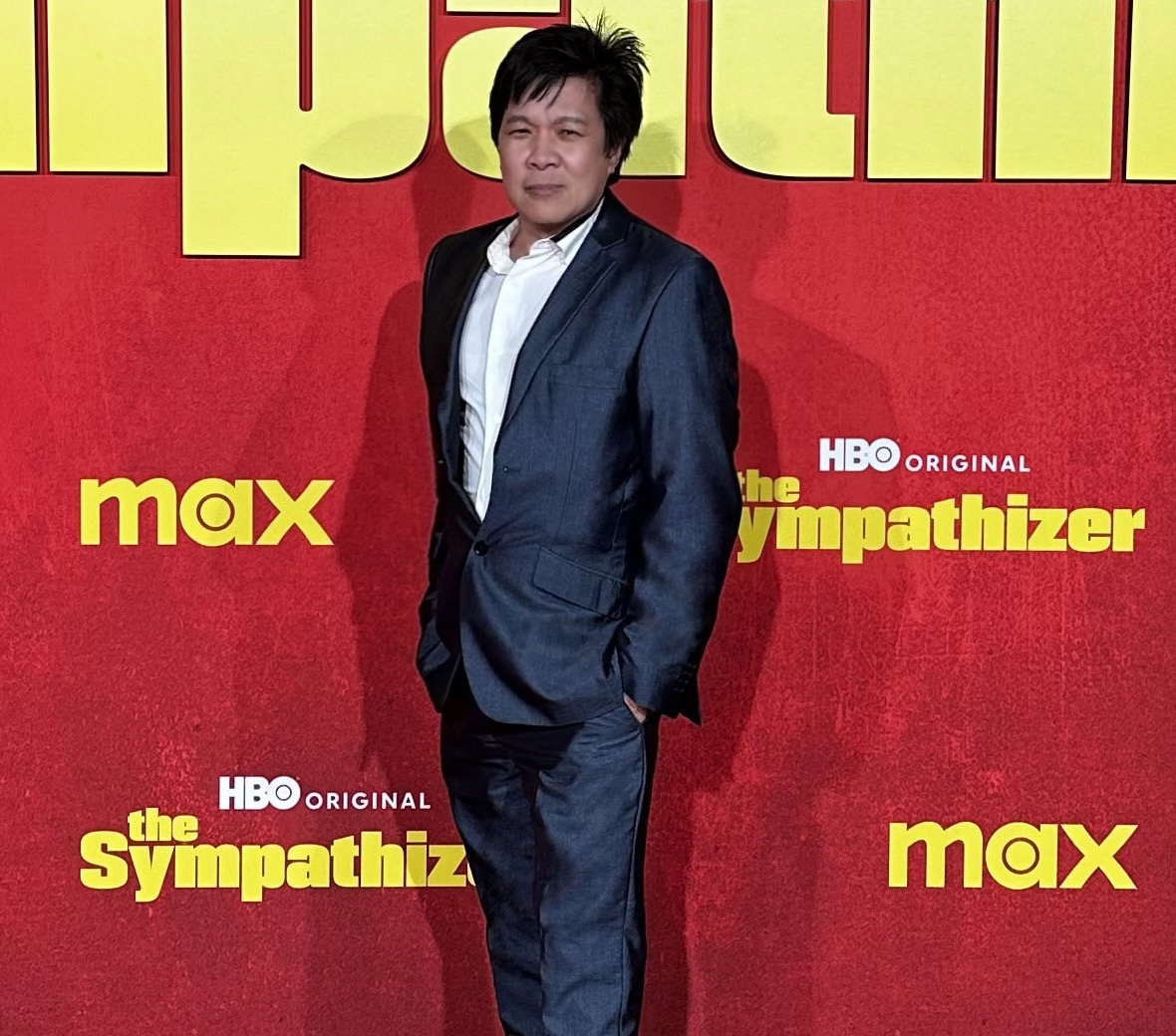
- Born: October 31, 1976 (age 49); Phan Rang, Vietnam
- Occupations: Actor, director, producer, writer
- Years active: 1989–present

Chi Muoi Lo (born October 31, 1976) is an actor, writer, and entrepreneur. He is classically trained and best known for starring in the Vanishing Son made-for-television eight-hour mini-series and syndicated television episodic series. As a writer, director, and producer, his 2000 debut Catfish in Black Bean Sauce drew critical attention and received recognition at film festivals. As an entrepreneur, he is CEO of Allen Edelman Management and creator of an online course, Mastering the Business of Acting.

== Early life ==
Lo was born in Phan Rang, Vietnam, to a Vietnamese mother and a Chinese father. In 1978, three years after the Fall of Saigon, a two-year-old Lo and his family escaped communist Vietnam via boat that brought them to the United States. Upon their arrival, Lo and his family were placed in the Fort Indiantown Gap Refugee Camp where they were sponsored by the Jewish League of America and moved to Philadelphia, Pennsylvania. It was there that Lo was raised with his nine brothers and three sisters.

Lo entered the Philadelphia High School for the Creative and Performing Arts as a drama major. He also attended the Pennsylvania Governor's School for the Arts, and Dr. Glory's Children's Theater in New York. At Temple University, he was a theater major for one year before accepting a full scholarship from San Francisco's American Conservatory Theater.

Lo is fluent in three languages.

== Career ==
=== As an actor ===
Lo's 30-year acting career includes a key role as Dr. Greg Lee from the 1997 horror film The Relic as well as other film appearances including Indecent Proposal, Hot Shots! Part Deux, Gleaming the Cube, Buffy the Vampire Slayer, China Cry, Vietnam War Story: The Last Days and Kindergarten Cop.

Lo is best known for his lead role as Wago Chang, the titular character of the Vanishing Son made-for-television eight-hour mini-series and syndicated television series. He has also had a recurring role in In the Heat of the Night, has starred in TV movies Faith of My Fathers, Shannon's Deal, and Spike Lee's Sucker Free City as well as had guest appearances in Nip/Tuck, Cold Case, CSI: Crime Scene Investigation, Smallville, Malcolm in the Middle, Spin City, Suddenly Susan, NYPD Blue, Law & Order, Northern Exposure, Night Court, China Beach, Equal Justice, Tour Of Duty, Quantum Leap, and The Adventures of Brisco County, Jr..

His 2000 film Catfish in Black Bean Sauce was re-released for streaming on Amazon on December 22, 2020, and made available on Apple TV, Google Play, and Redbox in January 2021.

=== As a director & producer ===
Lo's debut as a film director and producer is Catfish in Black Bean Sauce. The film was named Variety's "Top 50 of 2001 Limited-Release Winner At The Box Office" list. The film won the Grand Jury Award at the 1999 Audience Award for Best Narrative Feature Florida Film Festival and Best Screenplay Award at the Newport Beach Film Festival. Catfish was named Best Feature Film and Audience Favorite at the WorldFest-Houston International Film Festival. Lo is the owner of Black Hawk Entertainment, Inc. production company since 1998. Lo is currently producing the drama series Life in Threes which is based on his novel of the same name.

=== As an entrepreneur ===
Lo is the founder of the Actor's Consortium and served as its artistic director from July 2002 through May 2005.

==== Talent management ====
Lo brought Allen Edelman Management which he has owned since 2002 and whose clients include Karen Malina White (Lean On Me, Malcolm & Eddie, Monster: The Jefferey Dahmer Story), Steven Krueger (Yellowjackets, The Originals, and Roswell: New Mexico), Tyler Christopher (General Hospital and Days of Our Lives), Richard Whiten (The Island, Two and a Half Men, The Morning Show), Christopher Wolfe (Modern Family, Brooklyn Nine-Nine, S.W.A.T.), Scott Connors (Westworld, Workaholics, NCIS, Criminal Minds), and Kieu Chinh (The Joy Luck Club, Dynasty, M*A*S*H, The Sympathizer, Dope Thief).

==== Mastering the Business of Acting ====
Lo created an educational series titled Mastering the Business of Acting, which he views as his legacy. The program is based on the skills and knowledge Lo developed over his career. Mastering the Business of Acting is an online program that teaches actors about the business side of acting. The program, which launched in February 2021, has sold over 100,000 copies. It teaches actors and actresses the practical tools and insights necessary to navigate the acting business. The program is intended to improve new actors’/actresses’ chances of succeeding in the entertainment industry. The Mastering The Business of Acting program consists of seven tracks. Each learning track covers a variety of topics to help actors break into the business and maintain a successful acting career, as well as discussing the art and business of auditioning, the constantly evolving industry, and the new technological advancements now expected of all actors. The program's units cover personal finance, auditions, casting, agents, managers, marketing, self-tapes, pictures, resumes, pitching, networking, and studio testing. Mastering the Business of Acting series features several experienced veterans of the film industry including actors, producers, directors and writers. Guest appearances include: Casting director John Frank Levey (ER, Shameless, The West Wing), top agent Todd Eisner (A3 Artists Agency, APA, Innovative Artists Talent & Literacy Agency, Inc.), episodic director Nancy Hower (Teachers, Quick Draw) and award-winning actress Karen Malina White (Monster: The Jeffrey Dahmer Story, The Proud Family: Louder and Prouder, Mom, Malcolm & Eddie, Shameless, Lean on Me).
