= Louis Chu =

American novelist

Louis Hing Chu (雷霆超) (October 1, 1915 – 1970) was an American writer who was a pioneer of Asian American literature. His only published work is the 1961 novel Eat a Bowl of Tea.

After emigrating to New Jersey from Taishan, China, Chu completed his high school education and received a bachelor's degree from Upsala College and a master's degree in sociology from New York University.

Aside from writing, Chu worked for the New York City's Department of Welfare and worked as the disc jockey for the Chinese Festival radio program on New York's WHOM-AM. He appeared on the April 2, 1961 episode of the television program What's My Line?, identifying his occupation as a disc jockey, concurrent with the release of his book Eat a Bowl of Tea.

Chu died in 1970 leaving behind his wife, four children and three grandchildren. Although Eat a Bowl of Tea was published in 1961, Chu never witnessed the impact of his novel because it was not well received by critics at the time. It wasn't until the novel was republished in 1979 that it was acknowledged as a pioneering contribution to Asian American literature.
