= List of Dawson's Creek characters =

The following is a list of characters for The WB teen television drama series, Dawson’s Creek (1998–2003). The series was created by Kevin Williamson and follows the lives of a group of close-knit friends who live in the fictional New England town of Capeside, Massachusetts.

The first season featured eight regular characters: the titular Dawson Leery (James Van Der Beek); Dawson's childhood friend Joey Potter (Katie Holmes); new girl in town Jen Lindley (Michelle Williams); Pacey Witter (Joshua Jackson), Dawson's other best friend; Gail Leery (Mary-Margaret Humes), Dawson's mother; Mitch Leery (John Wesley Shipp), Dawson's father; Bessie Potter (Nina Repeta), Joey's older sister; and Evelyn "Grams" Ryan, Jen's grandmother (Mary Beth Peil). In season two, siblings Jack (Kerr Smith) and Andie McPhee (Meredith Monroe) joined the series as recurring characters and became main characters in subsequent seasons; though Andie was not present for season five, she appeared as a guest in season six. In season five, Audrey Liddell (Busy Phillips) was introduced as Joey's college roommate and became a recurring character that season, becoming a main character in season six.

== Main characters ==
Character	Actor	Season					
Character	Actor	1	2	3	4	5	6
Dawson Leery	James Van Der Beek	Main	Main	Main	Main	Main	Main
Joey Potter	Katie Holmes	Main	Main	Main	Main	Main	Main
Jen Lindley	Michelle Williams	Main	Main	Main	Main	Main	Main
Pacey Witter	Joshua Jackson	Main	Main	Main	Main	Main	Main
Gail Leery	Mary-Margaret Humes	Main	Main	Main	Main	Recurring	Recurring
Mitchell "Mitch" Leery	John Wesley Shipp	Main	Main	Main	Main	Guest	
Evelyn "Grams" Ryan	Mary Beth Peil	Main	Main	Main	Main	Main	Main
Bessie Potter	Nina Repeta	Main	Main	Main	Main	Recurring	Recurring
Jack McPhee	Kerr Smith		Recurring	Main	Main	Main	Main
Andie McPhee	Meredith Monroe		Recurring	Main	Main		Guest
Audrey Liddell	Busy Phillips					Recurring	Main

== Recurring characters ==
The following is a list of characters that were recurring guests on the series; they are listed in the order that they first appeared on the show. Some characters have had story lines that spanned multiple seasons, while others are restricted to arcs that occurred during a single season of the show.

Character	Actor	Season					
Character	Actor	1	2	3	4	5	6
Gramps Ryan	Ed Grady	Recurring					
Tamara Jacobs	Leann Hunley	Recurring	Recurring				
Lillian "Lily" Leery	Kristen Solt					Recurring	Recurring
Nellie Oleson	Nicole Nieth	Recurring					
Kristy Livingstone	Ali Larter	Recurring	Recurring				
Abby Morgan	Monica Keena	Recurring	Recurring				
Cliff Elliot	Scott Foley	Recurring					
Bodie Wells	Obi Ndefo	Recurring		Recurring	Recurring		Recurring
Doug Witter	Dylan Neal	Recurring		Recurring	Recurring	Recurring	Recurring
Billy Konrad	Eion Bailey	Recurring					
Mike Potter	Gareth Williams	Recurring	Recurring				Recurring
Mr. Peterson	Edmund J. Kearney		Recurring				
Chris Wolfe	Jason Behr		Recurring				
John Witter	John Finn		Recurring		Recurring		Recurring
Devon	Rachael Leigh Cook		Recurring				
Tyson "Ty" Hicks	Eddie Mills		Recurring				
Joseph McPhee	David Dukes		Recurring	Recurring	Recurring		
Nicole Kennedy	Mädchen Amick		Recurring				
Eve Whitman	Brittany Daniel			Recurring			
Rob Logan	Niklaus Lange			Recurring			
Belinda McGovern	Vanessa Dorman			Recurring			
Henry Parker	Michael Pitt			Recurring			
Nikki Green	Bianca Lawson			Recurring			
Principal Howard Green	Obba Babatundé			Recurring			
Marcy Bender	Aubrey Dollar			Recurring			
A.J. Moller	Robin Dunne			Recurring			
Ethan Brody	Adam Kaufman			Recurring			
Buzz Thompson	Jonathan Lipnicki			Recurring			
Will Krudski	Rodney Scott			Recurring			
Gretchen Witter	Sasha Alexander				Recurring		
Mrs. Valentine	Carolyn Hennesy				Recurring		
Drue Valentine	Mark Matkevich				Recurring		
Arthur "A.I." Brooks	Harve Presnell				Recurring		
Principal Peskin	Harry Shearer				Recurring		
Tobey Barrett	David Monahan				Recurring	Recurring	
Melanie Shea Thompson	Jennifer Morrison					Recurring	
Professor David Wilder	Ken Marino					Recurring	
Dr. Rachel Weir	Pauley Perrette					Recurring	
Heather Tracy	Nicole Bilderback					Recurring	Recurring
Charlie Todd	Chad Michael Murray					Recurring	
Todd Carr	Hal Ozsan					Recurring	Recurring
Karen Torres	Lourdes Benedicto					Recurring	
Danny Brecher	Ian Kahn					Recurring	
Eric	Ryan Bittle					Recurring	
Oliver Chirchick	Jordan Bridges					Recurring	
Amy Lloyd	Meredith Salenger					Recurring	
Clifton Smalls	Afemo Omilami					Recurring	
Alexandra "Alex" Pearl	Sherilyn Fenn					Recurring	
Emma Jones	Megan Gray						Recurring
Professor Greg Hetson	Roger Howarth						Recurring
Eddie Doling	Oliver Hudson						Recurring
Professor Matt Freeman	Sebastian Spence						Recurring
C.J.	Jensen Ackles						Recurring
Rich Rinaldi	Dana Ashbrook						Recurring
Natasha Kelly	Bianca Kajlich						Recurring
Harley Hetson	Mika Boorem						Recurring
David	Greg Rikaart						Recurring
Sadia Shaw	Sarah Shahi						Recurring
Helen Lindley	Mimi Rogers						Recurring
Jack Osbourne	himself						Recurring

== Notable guest appearances ==
- Melissa McBride as Nina in "Road Trip" and Melanie "In All Good Things..."
- Mel Harris as Helen Lindley in "Guess Who's Coming to Dinner"
- Julie Bowen as Aunt Gwen in "Stolen Kisses"
- Danny Roberts as Jean-Jean in "Coming Home"
- Jane Lynch as Mrs. Witter in "The Te of Pacey"
- Pat Hingle as Irv the Mechanic in "Eastern Standard Time"
- Andy Griffith as Andrew Lanier in "A Winter's Tale"
- Eddie Cahill as Max Winter in "Everything Put Together Falls Apart"
- Ray Wise as Roger Stepavich in "All the Right Moves"
- Seth Rogen as Bob in "Rock Bottom"
- Paul Gleason as Larry Newman in "Sex and Violence"

=== Special cameo appearances ===
- No Doubt as themselves in "Spiderwebs"
- Adam Carolla as himself in "Lovelines"
- Dr. Drew Pinsky as himself in "Lovelines"
