= Pacey Witter =

Fictional character from the television series Dawson's Creek

- Dawson's Creek character
- Joshua Jackson as Pacey Witter
- First appearance: "Pilot" (episode 1.01)
- Last appearance: "...Must Come to an End" (episode 6.24)
- Created by: Kevin Williamson
- Portrayed by: Joshua Jackson

In-universe information
- Full name: Pacey John Witter
- Nicknames: Pace, Witter
- Occupation: Professional: Owner of the Ice House restaurant Stockbroker for the Liddell's stockbroker company in Boston (formerly); Security Officer for Capeside Marina (formerly); Chef at Civilization Restaurant (formerly); Yacht Deckhand (formerly); Caretaker at Potter's Bed & Breakfast (formerly); Assistant at Screen Play Video in Capeside (formerly) Academic: Cooking school (formerly; graduated); Capeside High School (formerly; graduated)
- Family: John Witter (father); Mrs. Witter (mother); Gretchen Witter (sister); Kerry Witter (sister); Douglas Witter (brother); Unnamed older sister Two unnamed nephews and an unnamed niece via Kerry Witter
- Significant others: Love interests: Joey Potter (girlfriend as of "...Come To An End"); Maddy Allen (former fling); Sadia Shaw (former fling); Emma Jones (former fling); Denise (one night stand); Audrey Liddell (ex-girlfriend); Alex Pearl (former fling); Rina (one night stand); Karen (former fling); Melanie Thompson (former fling); Jen Lindley (former fling); Andie McPhee (ex-girlfriend); Tamara Jacobs (former fling) Friendships: Dawson Leery (best friend); Joey Potter (friend); Jennifer Lindley (friend, deceased); Andrea McPhee (friend); Jack McPhee (friend); Danny Brecher (mentor); William Krudski (friend)
- Hometown: Capeside, Massachusetts
- Residence: New York City, New York; Capeside, Massachusetts (formerly)

Pacey John Witter (born 1983) is a fictional character in the WB television drama Dawson's Creek. He is a principal character in all six seasons of the series and portrayed by actor Joshua Jackson.

== Background ==
Pacey Witter is a sarcastic, underachieving 15-year-old boy at the start of the series. Constantly labeled by his family as a "black sheep", he has a distant relationship with his emotionally abusive parents. He has considered Dawson Leery his best friend since his childhood and would often rely on him when family issues arose. Pacey has also known Joey Potter through their mutual friendship with Dawson, though they are initially only friends because of Dawson and would occasionally get on each other's nerves.

== Character arc ==
=== Season 1 ===
In season one, 15-year-old Pacey is introduced as Dawson's inconsequent best friend and somewhat of a “Bad Boy" type. He has sex with his English teacher, Tamara Jacobs (Leann Hunley). When Pacey relays the details of his sexual encounter with Ms. Jacobs to Dawson in a school bathroom, the conversation is overheard by another boy in the next stall. Rumors quickly begin to spread about the nature of Pacey's relationship with the 36-year-old teacher and the ensuing scandal eventually forces Ms. Jacobs to end their relationship and leave town.

Following his relationship with Tamara, Pacey spends most of his time hanging out with Jen, Dawson and Joey, with whom he always had an antagonistic relationship. Forced to partner on a biology project, Pacey and Joey spend a whole day together and Pacey finds himself romantically interested in Joey. He realizes that maybe he could like her and asks Dawson if he can ask Joey out, which forces Dawson to assess his own feelings toward Joey. Pacey kisses Joey, but she turns him down. Pacey also comically enters a beauty pageant and performs a skit from Braveheart.

=== Season 2 ===
In season two, Pacey attempts to reinvent himself by dyeing his hair and pursuing his longtime crush, Kristy Livingstone, though his efforts ultimately prove unsuccessful. He decides to celebrate his 16th birthday at the docks in an effort to change how people perceive him, but the party is a disappointment when nobody realizes it is his birthday and Dawson forgets altogether. Fortunately, Dawson later realizes his mistake and makes it up to him. Pacey undergoes a more significant transformation after meeting Andie McPhee, an academic overachiever who is new to Capeside. The two initially clash but gradually develop a romance, though their relationship is complicated by the return of Tamara, Pacey's former teacher with whom he had a sexual relationship. Pacey and Tamara kiss, but ultimately go their separate ways, allowing Pacey to finally gain some closure. Meanwhile, Andie's support and encouragement help bolster Pacey's low self-esteem. With her belief in him, he gradually begins to believe that he is capable of achieving whatever he sets his mind to, leading to a noticeable improvement in his academic performance.

Pacey and Andie get together and she offers to help Pacey reform his study habits and Pacey begins to do well in school, achieving his first-ever A. The two grow closer, embarking on a sexual relationship as well. Pacey is, at first, overcome with emotion by all of these changes to his life and the lack of predictability that had become the only stable force in his life. Even though it terrifies him, he comes to terms with how important Andie is to him and how much he loves her. His recent inspiration for changing his life also makes the psychological abuse of his family all the more straining, which culminates in a fishing trip Pacey and Dawson take with their fathers – along with Jack, who Pacey invites along in spite of Dawson's jealousy and subsequent ire. Pacey spends the entire trip doing his best to do as his father tells him and stay out of harms way, but is constantly berated for his efforts. At the end of the trip Pacey catches a big fish and wins a competition upon their return to Capeside, but his father manages to ruin the victory by telling Pacey that he probably won't have many more moments like that.

As Andie's mental health begins to suffer due to the strain of caring for her mother and the death of her eldest brother Tim, Pacey becomes concerned for her and their future and struggles with what he can do to help Andie. Eventually the pressure is too much for Andie and she breaks up with Pacey, who is adamant that he not push her away at a time when she needs him and he tells her that he loves her for the first time. Andie begins to hallucinate that she is seeing her deceased brother, and suffers a nervous breakdown. She takes a leave of absence at the end of the season for a stay in a mental health facility. The strained relationship Pacey has with his neglectful and alcoholic father is further explored this season, as well as the effect Andie has on that relationship. When Andie leaves for the mental health facility to get better, Pacey misses her terribly and his abrasive father makes a snide comment about Andie being crazy, for which Pacey hits him. Near the end of the season, Andie tells Pacey's father over the phone to give Pacey a hug for her, and his father does. This ultimately leads to a touching moment — it seems that they can start to put their past behind them and, for the first time, Pacey looks for some support from his father and actually gets it.

=== Season 3 ===
After a summer apart, Pacey eagerly awaits Andie’s return while encouraging Dawson to pursue Eve. Hoping to surprise Andie, Pacey brings Joey to pick her up early from the facility where she spent the summer, only to learn that Andie had an affair. Devastated, Pacey ends their relationship and throws himself into restoring a wrecked boat. When Andie’s new boyfriend attacks her, she and Pacey briefly reconnect, but Pacey ultimately tells her that he no longer loves her romantically.

After his family once again labels him a failure, Pacey begins a casual, no-strings-attached relationship with Jen. While stranded on Witch Island, the two make out in a supposedly haunted church and continue trying to pursue their arrangement afterward. Meanwhile, Pacey and Joey take ballroom dancing lessons together to win a scholarship. When Dawson and Jen discover Pacey and Jen making out in the studio’s coat closet, Joey’s reaction leads Jen to suspect that she has feelings for Pacey. Pacey insists that nothing is going on between him and Joey, but he and Jen ultimately decide they are better off as friends.

After failing his classes, Pacey is forced to participate in a school production of Barefoot in the Park, where Andie serves as assistant director. Although initially reluctant, he comes to enjoy the experience. After the play, Pacey and Andie mend fences and agree to start over as friends.

After failing grades, Pacey has to complete an English Class project – starring in a school production of Barefoot in the Park. Coincidentally, Andie is the assistant director of the play and they eventually manage to work well on the project together. Although semi-coerced into doing the play, Pacey eventually finds that he enjoys it and has fun playing the character of Paul. After the show, he and Andie talk a bit and mend fences, deciding to start anew as friends.

As the season progresses, Pacey realizes he may have feelings for Joey, which worries him. He gets into a fight with a bully who admits to vandalizing a mural Joey paints for the school, and as punishment, he is assigned to mentor a young, neglected boy with a rebellious attitude not unlike Pacey's.

To encourage Joey's art, Pacey rents her a wall. He eventually acts on his feelings and kisses Joey. She reacts furiously to the possible implications on their friendships. Pacey is also extremely concerned about the possible demise of his friendship with Dawson due to his feelings for Joey. He attempts to tell Dawson during a camping trip but chickens out.

Pacey's childhood friend, Will Krudski, joins them during a spring break visit to Dawson's Aunt Gwen. While there, Pacey and Joey find themselves increasingly tense and uncomfortable around each other. Joey eventually admits that she felt a spark when Pacey touched her, prompting him to count to ten before kissing her. Their kiss is interrupted by Dawson's aunt, but later that night, they confess their feelings for each other, acknowledging that, despite how much their feelings are tearing them apart, neither can make them go away.

When Dawson accidentally learns about Pacey and Joey's burgeoning relationship from Jen several weeks after it begins, he reacts furiously, ending his friendship with Pacey and competing for Joey's attention. Fearing that her relationship with Pacey will permanently damage her friendship with Dawson, Joey reluctantly breaks things off with Pacey. Dawson, however, remains unwilling to forgive Pacey.

At the Anti-Prom, Pacey attends with Andie while Joey goes with Dawson. Joey becomes increasingly uncomfortable with the situation, and Jack encourages her to set an example for both Dawson and Pacey. She asks Pacey to dance, infuriating Dawson and leading to another confrontation. Joey ultimately chooses her friendship with Dawson once again.

Pacey decides to leave Capeside and spend the summer sailing, but when Joey learns of his plans, she confronts him for giving up. Realizing that Joey is right, Pacey paints “ask me to stay” on her wall. The following day, he attends Dawson's parents' wedding, where Joey tells him that she cannot give him a reason to stay because she still needs to work through her feelings.

After realizing that Joey is unhappy, Dawson reluctantly accepts her feelings and encourages her to go after Pacey. After securing Joey's assurance that their friendship will survive, Dawson lets her go. Joey runs after Pacey as he is leaving, telling him that she is in love with him and wants to spend the summer with him. Pacey and Joey then leave Capeside together aboard his boat, the True Love.

=== Season 4 ===
Pacey and Joey return from their summer at sea still deeply in love, but Joey’s determination to repair her friendship with Dawson causes tension between them. Although they reconcile, Pacey remains increasingly insecure about Joey prioritizing Dawson’s feelings over their relationship. Meanwhile, Pacey’s own friendship with Dawson remains badly damaged. His older sister, Gretchen, returns to Capeside from college, and the two move into a beach house together.

As Pacey and Joey adjust to being a couple back in Capeside, Pacey continues to struggle academically, while both begin worrying about their future beyond high school. After Dawson saves Pacey’s life during a storm, Pacey realizes how much he misses their friendship and apologizes. The two later team up with Jack to prank the principal and frame Drue, giving Pacey hope that they might eventually repair their friendship.

Pacey becomes concerned when Joey appears jealous after seeing Dawson and Gretchen kiss at Christmas. Joey eventually admits that she does not understand why she is bothered, but after talking with Dawson, she assures Pacey that she has moved past any lingering feelings. During the senior class ski trip, Pacey and Joey sleep together for the first time. Joey initially struggles to communicate afterward, but they reconcile, and she assures Pacey that she is happy they did. When Dawson later asks Joey if she has slept with Pacey, she lies and says no. Gretchen discovers the truth and tells Pacey, who is hurt but chooses not to confront Joey. Joey eventually comes clean to Dawson and Pacey, and Pacey accepts her explanation, telling her that what matters is that she finally told the truth.

Their relationship becomes increasingly strained by Pacey’s insecurities, Joey’s continued prioritization of Dawson, and uncertainty about their future. After seeing Joey share a dance with Dawson at senior prom that mirrors their own dance at the Anti-Prom, Pacey explodes and publicly berates her, leading to their breakup. Both are devastated, with Pacey spiraling and Joey turning back toward her renewed friendship with Dawson.

Pacey manages to graduate high school at the last minute and takes a job on a yacht, leaving Capeside once again. He cuts off contact with Joey but, on his final day in town, calls Dawson in another attempt to repair their friendship.

=== Season 5 ===
After working as a deckhand on a yacht all summer following graduation from high school, Pacey settles in Boston and takes a job working as a chef in a fancy restaurant, Civilization. When Jen discovers that he's in town Pacey asks her not to tell the others, but Joey sees him at the restaurant. They share a sweet reunion on Pacey's boat, as friends. Pacey has a relationship with one of the waitresses at Civilization, Karen. This turns out to be problematic as she is having an affair with the head chef, Danny, a married man that Pacey considers a mentor.

Pacey returns to Capeside after hearing the news of the death of Mitch Leery. He learns that Joey and Dawson's reignited complicated relationship has resurfaced, and reassures Joey that he understands. He later attempts to console Dawson and help him deal with the guilt that he feels about his father's death by taking him out to the site of Mitch's accident and relaying the true circumstances of his death.

He and Audrey (Joey's roommate) become interested in each other and quickly embark on a physical relationship. During the gang's spring break trip to Florida, Audrey and Pacey decide to make their relationship official. Pacey's mentor, Danny, leaves Civilization and a new manager, Alex Pearl (Sherilyn Fenn), takes over. Alex alienates the restaurant staff causing Pacey to lead a walk-out en masse during a meeting with local investors to protest Alex's management policies. As a result, the restaurant is shut down and both Pacey and Alex are fired. As summer approaches, Pacey returns to Capeside to work as a security guard at the Capeside Yacht Club, but leaves to attempt to rekindle things with Audrey. He eventually convinces her to take him back and the two drive cross-country to Audrey's home in L.A.

=== Season 6 ===
Pacey finds financial success as a stockbroker in Boston, which is set up by Audrey's father. He moves in with Jack and a girl named Emma. Audrey breaks things off with him, after she hears him confessing to Emma that he doesn't think he ever loved her. Later in the season, during Christmas in Capeside, Audrey confronts Dawson, Joey and Pacey for never dealing with their past and by consequence never growing up.

Joey and Pacey share a drunken kiss at his apartment during a party. After being locked overnight in a K-Mart together, they discuss their past and current relationship. How they feel uncomfortable talking about sex with each other or how they never discuss their past and how the fact they never had closure impacts them. In an intimate moment Joey shaves his beard. When they go to sleep she tells him a fantasy she had when she was a teenager. In the fantasy they would be castaways in an idyllic island, living their love away from everyone. They share a kiss after her confession. Each admits that they miss the other. However, they don't stay together because Joey's boyfriend comes back from a trip. She tells Pacey the timing doesn't feel right and decides to not pursue her feelings for him. Soon, she realizes things are not working with Eddie and the best thing for her is to spend sometime alone thinking about her life, what leads to her going on a personal journey as an independent woman and finally going to Paris.

Afterwards, Pacey somewhat makes amends with his estranged father when he visits him in Capeside after his father suffers a mild heart attack. With Pacey's father too sick to work anymore because of multiple health problems from his life-long alcoholism, Pacey's brother, Doug, takes over as acting police chief of Capeside. While working as a stockbroker, Pacey clashes several times with his slick, arrogant boss, Rich Renaldi (Dana Ashbrook).

Pacey and Dawson continue to rebuild their friendship, and Dawson trusts Pacey with the savings he intends to use to film his latest feature. Pacey jumps at the chance to impress Dawson and strengthen their friendship but invests all of the money in a single stock and talks Dawson out of taking the funds out when he has made a profit. His life comes crashing down when loses his and Dawson's money in the bio-tech stock bust, and is later fired after asking Rich to loan him enough money to reimburse Dawson, which leads to a fight when Rich taunts Pacey.

Pacey eventually comes clean to Dawson. This devastates Dawson and reignites their years-long fight, in which Dawson articulates the demise of their friendship stemmed from Pacey choosing his romantic intentions over his duties as a friend. They both acknowledge the friendship is unlikely to recover and part ways, devastated.

Pacey returns to Capeside and temporarily moves in with Doug, giving in to depression. After Joey resurrects Dawson's film and convinces Pacey to step-up and begin making amends for his actions, Pacey begins lessening his debt by raising what money he can from local business owners to start paying Dawson back. Pacey and Joey meet one last time, and they acknowledge their need to move on. Pacey attempts to pass along the money he has collected for Dawson, but Joey decides it is about time for Pacey and Dawson to work out their issues without her in the middle and refuses.

Later, Pacey and Dawson are both tricked into meeting up by Joey; Pacey passes on the money he has collected. They discuss the circumstances of the destruction of their friendship and acknowledge the rift might not be irreparable.

==== Series finale ====
Five years later, a 25-year-old Pacey is now the proprietor of The Icehouse, a successful restaurant in Capeside bearing the same name as the one Joey's family used to operate. Even though he's a successful chef, he feels empty and he's still unhappy. He is having an affair with a married woman.

On the occasion of Gale Leery's wedding, everyone returns to Capeside. The five friends reunite at Pacey's restaurant to reminisce about the past. Dawson is nearing the end of production of his semi-autographical TV series 'The Creek', of which Pacey has posters hung at his restaurant. Joey is now a junior editor living in New York and she is in a serious relationship with a writer.

During Gail's wedding reception, Pacey kisses Joey (reigniting lingering feelings between the two), but the moment is interrupted when Jen collapses. It is later discovered that Jen has a deadly heart condition. The two spend time together in Capeside while Jen is hospitalized. In the midst of their romantic entanglements, Joey, Dawson, Jack, and Pacey are brought together at the Ice House to say goodbye to Jen, who dies from pulmonary congestion.

At the same time, Joey ends her relationship with her boyfriend after Jen tells her that her dying wish is to Joey to stop running and declare her desires. She reiterated her love for Dawson; she acknowledges that he is her soulmate who is tied to her childhood, a love that is pure and eternally innocent. She also cannot deny that the love she has for Pacey is real and has kept her running from it. Before she can elaborate, the two are interrupted.

In the epilogue, it is revealed that Joey and Pacey are watching Dawson's semi-autobiographical television series The Creek in her apartment in New York City, appearing to have reignited their relationship. They excitedly call up Dawson together, apparently having restored their rift and strengthened the relationship between the trio of childhood friends.

They congratulate Dawson and are delighted to discover he is going to meet his hero, Steven Spielberg, the following day. The series ends with Pacey, his girlfriend, and his on-and-off best friend conversing over the phone as the camera pans to a photograph of the three with Jen.

== Notable relationships ==
- Tamara Jacobs
  - Fling
    - Beginning: "Pilot" (1.01)
    - Broke Up: "Baby" (1.06)
      - Reason: Tamara leaves town after their illegal liaison after Pacey accidentally leaks the news to the school.
- Andie Mcphee
  - Girlfriend
    - First Relationship:
      - Beginning: "The Dance" (2.06)
      - End: "Homecoming" (3.02)
      - Reason: Andie cheated on Pacey while at the clinic.
  - Kiss
    - "Secrets and lies" (3.06)
- Jen Lindley
  - Fling
    - Beginning: "Escape from Witch Island" (3.07)
    - Broke Up: "Four To Tango" (3.09)
      - Reason: They feel they're better off as friends and don't have sexual chemistry.
- Joey Potter
  - Kissed
    - "Double Date" (1.10)
    - "Cinderella Story" (3.17)
    - "Neverland" (3.18)
  - Boyfriend
    - First Relationship:
      - Beginning: "Stolen Kisses" (3.19)
      - End: "The Longest Day" (3.20)
      - Reason: Dawson gives her an ultimatum and she chooses their friendship over Pacey.
    - Second Relationship:
      - Beginning: "True Love" (3.23)
      - End: "Promicide" (4.20)
      - Reason: Pacey breaks up with Joey during their senior prom.
    - Third Relationship:
      - Beginning: Castaways" (6.15)
      - End: "Love Bites" (6.18)
      - Reason: Joey chooses her college boyfriend over Pacey.
    - Fourth Relationship:
      - Beginning: ...Must Come To An End" (6.24)
      - Note: Jen tells Joey her final wish is for Joey to stop running. Jen's death motivates Joey to reunite with Pacey.
- Audrey Liddell
  - Girlfriend
    - Beginning: "Guerilla Filmmaking" (5.14)
    - Broke Up: "Living Dead Girl" (6.06)
      - Reason: She overhears Pacey telling Emma that he doesn't think he ever loved her.
- Emma Jones
  - Kissed
    - "Everything Put Together Falls Apart" (6.09)

== Reception ==
First introduced as Dawson's best male friend and comic relief, Pacey emerged as a romantic hero through the course of season two. The second season explores Pacey's relationship with new girl in town Andie McPhee, as well as his relationship with his abusive father and the impact it has on his self-esteem. Creator Kevin Williamson says that he saw season two as a "sort of An Officer and a Gentleman storyline where the season really became Pacey's Pond" and "he started to care about himself and made an effort to be a better person for the love of a good woman and ultimately for himself".

Season three focused on building a romantic triangle featuring Pacey competing with Dawson for the affections of Joey, a story line that is frequently hailed by critics as one of the best love triangles in television drama. Addressing season three's arc, showrunner Greg Berlanti says, "I would get Pacey with Joey and have a King Arthur–esque story — Dawson being King Arthur — exploring what happens when Lancelot and Guinevere fall in love. [Joey and Pacey] always had such wonderful chemistry, the two of them — they have a Tracy and Hepburn quality that I liked writing for." The story reignited interest in the show and the love triangle would serve as a driving plot line through the series' final episode.

Joshua Jackson received positive reviews throughout the series for his portrayal of Pacey. In a retrospective review for The Guardian, critic Jonathan Bernstein said "not only did Joshua Jackson have more credible chemistry with Katie Holmes, whom he briefly dated in real life, but Pacey quickly eclipsed Dawson as both the series’ most relatable character and its moral centre." Jezebel said "their screwball dynamic, coupled with actors Katie Holmes and Joshua Jackson's untapped chemistry and an intricately plotted courtship subverted everything expected of the show. It unsurprisingly still resonates with so many millennial women who grew up watching the series. There was a time when we had come for the angst, but now we were staying for the romance." Jackson was the only Dawson's Creek cast member to win a Teen Choice Award three times, for Choice Actor in a TV Drama Series.

The love triangle between Pacey, Dawson and Joey was credited with injecting energy into the show when it was struggling in the ratings. They were included in TV Guide's list of "The Best TV Couples of All Time" and on BuzzFeed's "19 Friends-To-Lovers TV Couples That Stole Fans' Hearts" list. Harper's Bazaar ranked them at number 7 in their "70 of the Best TV Couples of All Time" list. Entertainment Weekly also ranked Pacey and Joey as number 20 on their list of the 100 Best TV Romances of All Time.
