= Paul Stupin =

American film and television executive

Paul Stupin is an American film and television executive.

== Biography ==
After graduating from Williams College in Williamstown, Massachusetts, Stupin went to Los Angeles to work for NBC in series development. In 1986 he became a vice president for production at Tri-Star Pictures, overseeing such films as Steel Magnolias, and Short Circuit. From there, he was recruited to the fledgling Fox Network as executive vice president of series programming serving there from 1989 to 1992. Stupin's greatest legacy was bringing a twenty-nine-year-old screenwriter, Darren Star, to producer Aaron Spelling. Star had ideas of a high school drama and Spelling, for the first time since the 1960s, had not one show on the air. The result of their partnership was Beverly Hills, 90210, an immediate hit with the first episode scoring a phenomenal forty share among the 12-17 demographic.

Stupin left Fox to become an executive at Reeves Entertainment and then joined Columbia TriStar Television. In 1995, he read the script for a horror movie that had precipitated a bidding war between producers. The script was for Scream and the author was Kevin Williamson. Stupin thought Williamson would be ideal to create another high school drama. Williamson's script, to become Dawson's Creek was first offered to Stupin's old network, but Fox turned it down. The WB leapt at it to fill their new night of programming, Tuesdays, with Buffy the Vampire Slayer. Dawson's Creek; the show became an instant hit and a defining show for The WB. Stupin, while remaining an executive at Columbia, was one of Dawson's Creek's executive producers. He will work as executive producer for the movie adaptation of the novel Betwixt, the storybook for the adaptation is written by Elisabeth Chandler. The teen horror film is an WBTV and CBS Studios production.
