= Dawson Leery =

Dawson Wade Leery
- Dawson's Creek character
- James Van Der Beek as Dawson Leery
- First appearance: "Pilot" (episode 1.01)
- Last appearance: "...Must Come to an End" (episode 6.24)
- Created by: Kevin Williamson
- Portrayed by: James Van Der Beek

In-universe information
- Occupation: Professional : Film director/Television producer/Screenwriter (currently); Assistant to the film director on a shoot (formerly); House painter (formerly); Assistant at Screen Play Video in Capeside (formerly) Education : Visual Arts Boston - Cinema studies (formerly); USC - USC School of Cinematic Arts (dropped out); Capeside High School (formerly/graduated) Hobbies : Making films (talented); Screenwriting (talented); Photography (talented); Sailing (good)
- Family: Mitch Leery (father; deceased); Gail Leery (mother); Lillian Leery (sister); Gwen (aunt); Unnamed stepfather
- Significant others: Love interests : Natasha Kelly (ex-girlfriend); Joey Potter (ex-girlfriend); Amy Lloyd (one night stand); Jen Lindley (ex-girlfriend); Gretchen Witter (ex-girlfriend); Eve Whitman (former fling) Friendship : Joey Potter (best friend/soulmate); Pacey Witter (friend); Jen Lindley (friend, deceased); Jack McPhee (friend) "Andie" McPhee (friend); Audrey Liddell (friend); Todd Carr (friend and business partner); Oliver Chirchick (friend and former business partner); Arthur Brooks (mentor, deceased)
- Hometown: Capeside, Massachusetts
- Residence: Los Angeles, California; Formerly: Boston, Massachusetts

Dawson Wade Leery is the titular protagonist from the WB television drama Dawson's Creek. He is introduced in the pilot and portrayed by James Van Der Beek in 122 episodes throughout the series' run, as well as a non-canon cameo in Scary Movie (2000).

Dawson, created by Kevin Williamson based on his own experiences as a teenager, is a budding filmmaker growing up in the fictional town of Capeside, Massachusetts. The series follows his journey from adolescence into adulthood, particularly focusing on his filmmaking struggles and complex relationship with childhood best friend Joey Potter.

== Fictional biography ==
=== Background ===
Dawson is the first child and only son of Mitch Leery and his college sweetheart, Gail Leery. He was born on March 14, 1983 (per Season 3, Episode 10). His three best friends are Joey Potter, the girl across the creek whom he has known since childhood and considers his soulmate; Pacey Witter, Capeside High's class clown, and Jen Lindley, a girl who has moved from New York into the house next door. Dawson's younger sister Lily is born when he is eighteen years old.

== Character arc ==
=== Season 1 ===
Introduced as a quality friend and eternal optimist, Dawson believes in the good old fashioned values of romance and honesty, and he also believes that you can find all of life's answers in a Steven Spielberg film. He was a keen filmmaker and made several low cost and amateur films, which were entered into film festivals across the country, and in some festivals his films won top prize. He and long-time friend Joey Potter spend much of their time together, often sleeping in Dawson's bed together. However, their relationship complicates as they age and especially with the arrival of New York exile Jen Lindley, who moves in next door to Dawson. He enters into his first relationship with her, but after her ex visits, she dumps him, insisting she needs time for herself.

After this, a series of events causes him to see lifelong friend Joey in a whole new light. First, his wise-cracking best friend Pacey Witter asks for Dawson's permission to ask Joey out. Dawson responds jealously. Later, he sees Joey looking sophisticated and mature for a Beauty Pageant, which opens his eyes to her beauty. Finally, he joins Joey on a birthday visit to her father in prison and tells Mike Potter all about the daughter he doesn't know. While Joey wrestles with the idea of spending a year in France, Dawson realizes that he can no longer hold back his romantic feelings towards her. The season ends with Dawson and Joey kissing in front of his bedroom window.

=== Season 2 ===
Although initially Dawson and Joey have smooth sailing, newcomer Jack McPhee comes to town and develops feelings for Joey, eventually kissing her. The kiss confuses Joey, who is struggling to find a passion in life. She dumps Dawson in an effort to find herself, but ends up quickly dating Jack. This sends Dawson back into the arms of Jen, who has been flirting with her old rebellious ways, and helps Dawson cut loose. All along, Dawson mopes over the loss of Joey, even making a movie recounting their breakup.

When Joey's relationship with Jack crumbles due to the revelation that he is homosexual, she comes literally crying to Dawson. For his sixteenth birthday, Dawson feels depressed that he hasn't grown and wasn't able to keep Joey, so he gets drunk with Andie McPhee. This results in him insulting nearly all of his friends, including Pacey, of whom Dawson is envious for his newly together life. Soon Dawson and Joey end up back together. However, their reconciliation is short-lived, as Dawson soon learns that Joey's father, who has gotten paroled from jail, is selling drugs again. Dawson urges Joey to wear a wire to bust her father. After this, Joey vows that she will never forgive Dawson for the position he put her in.

=== Season 3 ===
After a summer spent with his mom in Philadelphia, Dawson returns to Capeside still reeling from his split with Joey. On the bus ride home, he meets Eve, a mysterious, blonde femme fatale that seems intent upon luring Dawson with her sex appeal. After make out scenes in the janitor's closet and in front of the entire school at a pep rally, Eve convinces Dawson to go for a ride in his dad's boat. He does, but wrecks it on the way in and is told he must pay $3,000 to repair the damage to the dock he crashed into. Pacey then convinces Dawson to throw a stripper party at his parents' house to earn the money to pay for the dock. Although they successfully gather enough money, Mitch catches everyone leaving the house and Dawson knows he's in trouble.

Joey corners Dawson, apologises for breaking up with him and attempts to seduce him into restarting their relationship. Dawson refuses, concerned that further drama would destroy their fragile friendship.

In the meantime, Dawson finds Eve snooping around in Grams's house one night. Before he had realized that it was Eve he had called the police and it is Deputy Doug that turns up on the scene. He brushes it off afterwards, not wanting to get Eve in trouble. He later discovers an old photograph of a blonde lady in the house-boat that Eve has been living in, which he takes. Doug informs Dawson that the boat belongs to an elderly couple.

When Eve later comes for the photo he insists that Eve tell the truth. Eve reveals that she is adopted and that the woman in the picture is her biological mother and that she is searching for her. While helping Grams at her house, Dawson notices the same woman in a picture sitting on a nightstand. He asks who the woman is and Grams reveals that it's her daughter, Helen, Jen's mother. Dawson decides against telling Jen of his discovery. However, when Jen's mother visits her mother and her daughter at Thanksgiving Dawson confronts her, pretty much forcing her to tell Jen herself.

When Dawson, Pacey and Joey join Jack and his ex-girlfriend Kate at a party hosted by Matt Caufield, the entire group, except Joey, gets drunk. Dawson, fighting to have a life separate from Joey's, nearly kisses Kate. When Pacey's brother, Deputy Doug busts the party after finding Pacey lying in a tree, the group all end up spending the remainder of the evening behind bars. While Dawson tells Joey that she cannot be his keeper, Jack confesses to Kate that he's gay. Meanwhile, Mitch turns from friend to parent, and as a result of having to bail his son out of jail, enlists Dawson to help out at his mother's new restaurant.

After meeting a rival film-maker, Dawson realizes that he has let his desire to become a director overtake his life, and he decides to give it up for a period of time. He takes down all the posters in his room, and tries to cultivate other interests. During this tumultuous time, he realizes that the only thing in his life that has ever made sense is Joey, and determines to win her back.

Unbeknownst to Dawson, Joey and Pacey have been growing closer and eventually embark on a secret romance. When Dawson hears about the burgeoning relationship from Jen, he reacts with anger and cuts Pacey out of his life. He becomes more determined than ever to win Joey back. Joey and Dawson attend prom together, but when Dawson sees Joey sharing a dance with Pacey, he demands Joey choose between the two of them. Later, he realizes he doesn't want to hold Joey back from following her heart, and encourages her to go after Pacey. Dawson, dejected at losing Joey, is emotionally supported by Jen, Jack, and Andie, who make plans to spend the summer together as foursome.

=== Season 4 ===
Dawson has spent the summer working on his photography and building his friendships with Jen, Jack and Andie. Joey returns with a symbolic gift, apologizing and reiterating her desire to begin rebuilding their friendship, however Dawson admits he isn't convinced he wants to be friends with her, or even try.

Dawson shows disinterest in having Pacey in his life at all, but after heroically saving Pacey and Jen from a storm at sea, Pacey apologizes for the hurt he caused Dawson, and the two call a truce. Dawson is forced to white wash a fence for old-time film director A.I. Brooks, as punishment for putting a hole in his boat which Dawson was forced to take to rescue Pacey and Jen. Eventually, Mr. Brooks warms to Dawson and lets him film a documentary on him when he tells Dawson that he is dying of cancer.

In the meantime, he is confronted with the realities of Pacey and Joey being a couple. Due to her determination to repair their friendship, Dawson reluctantly begins to let Joey back into his life, though his relationship with Pacey remains staunch until the end of the series.

Dawson must make a life-or-death decision about Mr. Brooks when he's admitted to the hospital in a coma involving his terminal illness and has requested that Dawson be the one to take him off life support. Dawson chooses to let him go. After an impromptu hangout with Joey, she lies to him, telling Dawson that she hasn't had sex with Pacey.

Dawson eventually receives an inheritance check from Mr Brooks estate, which he decides to use to help Joey attend the college of her choice, since she wasn't offered financial aid. Joey confesses her lie to Dawson, but Dawson finally reaffirms their friendship in spite of the turbulent year they had gone through and offers her the money anyway.

During this season, Dawson strikes up a romance with Gretchen, Pacey's 21-year-old sister, who has arrived back to Capeside to take a break from college, or so everyone thinks, but she later reveals that she is there to recuperate from a miscarriage that took place during her previous semester. The baby's father was her ex-boyfriend, pig-headed Nick, whom Pacey admired at first. During the Leery Christmas Party, Dawson and Gretchen share a kiss, which ignites old feelings from his pre-teen years when he had a crush on her.

After his sister Lily's birth in May 2001, Dawson and Gretchen part ways and she returns to college, and he graduates from high school. He and Joey resume their friendship in the wake of the demise of their relationships, which grows more intense as Dawson's departure to California grows closer. In his last night in Capeside, amid conversation and reflection on their complicated friendship, the two share a kiss. Despite Joey asking Dawson to stay, he heads off to USC to pursue his dream of becoming a film maker.

=== Season 5 ===
After graduating, he studied film at USC, but soon dropped out and moved to Boston to be with his friends and potentially pursue a romantic relationship with Joey. Before Dawson can even get his parents approval for moving to Boston his father Mitch Leery is tragically killed in a car accident.

Dawson struggles to cope in the aftermath. He blames himself and struggles to connect with Joey; instead confiding in his old girlfriend, Jen Lindley.

During their trip to the Hookset Film Festival in New Hampshire, Dawson loses his virginity to Jen, and they begin a relationship. It is at this festival that Dawson wins first prize for his documentary about A.I. Brooks. There, Dawson meets Oliver Churchkirk, an aspiring film director from Boston Bay College who fancies himself the best in the business. After being asked to read his script, Dawson agrees to direct Oliver's first major film. He casts Joey's bubbly roommate Audrey Liddell as the female lead, and Oliver casts himself as heartbreaker, Gage. After several flubbed lines and mistakes, Dawson concludes that Oliver is not the right person for the role. He then reluctantly casts Charlie Todd.

Some time later, Dawson and Jen break up. While Dawson and Oliver journey to New Jersey for a meeting with a film agent, the rest of the gang takes to the beaches of Florida for spring break; Pacey is hit on by Norwegian singer Marion Raven while working on his relationship with Audrey, while as Dawson later discovers, Joey embarks on a spring fling with Charlie Todd. Following his heart, Dawson hijacks the car with Oliver and drives down to Florida to tell Joey that he loves her. To Dawson's disappointment, Pacey tells him that Joey is with Charlie.

When their film is finished, Dawson learns that Oliver set up to have the film screened by cast, crew and friends. When Dawson finally agrees, he discovers that Oliver also invited a film critic, Amy Lloyd, who writes for The Boston Weekly. Dawson, not knowing who she is, stumbles upon Amy in the midst of a nasty break-up and tells her that she is a "sentimental drama queen with really crappy taste in movies." Angry, Amy leaves, unwilling to review the movie. In order to get her back to the auditorium, Dawson makes out with Amy at a local coffee shop in order to prevent her ex-boyfriend from seeing her; it turns out the man she was trying to avoid was not her ex-boyfriend. After running into Amy at a movie theatre in Boston, Dawson spends the night at Amy's house and the two have sex. He spends the remainder of the next day with her as well.

After Joey breaks his heart again, Dawson leaves a farewell note for her and heads to the airport to fly to Los Angeles. Joey intercepts him and tells him that she loves him but wants him to go begin his life. The two kiss goodbye and Dawson departs for California.

=== Season 6 ===
After not talking all summer, Dawson has a one-night stand with Joey. The next morning Dawson receives a call from a girl he'd been casually seeing in L.A. leading him and Joey to fight. Dawson returns to California.

After breaking things off with Joey, Dawson reunites with Hollywood actress, Natasha; she is presumed to be a few years his senior. In the meantime, when Joey shows up to deliver food to the movie set at which Dawson works, Natasha, drunk and angry, explodes on Joey; subsequently, the director, Todd Carr, fires Dawson. Realizing she made a mistake, Natasha helps Dawson get his job back.

Dawson pays a visit to Audrey in rehab, earning her dish duty for the night, after stalking one-time film director Toni Stark. He returns to L.A. only to discover that Todd, his new mentor and friend, is in disagreements with the film company that is paying him to make the movie, "Wicked Dead". While Todd quickly decides to discard Natasha from the leading role, Dawson convinces him otherwise. Dawson directs the re-shoots of the movie, but even so, the movie flops, going to straight to cable TV.

After realizing they have tickets for the wrong night of a No Doubt Concert in Worcester, Natasha uses her "assets" to get herself and Dawson admittance into the venue. When this fails, Dawson shows off his newly-won $600, hoping someone will trade tickets with him. However, this only attracts an on-duty police officer who takes the duo to a nearby station. They are let go with a warning from the authorities.

After a few months and some white lies, Dawson assumes that Natasha is having an affair with Todd. But his worries turn out to be all for nothing when two reveal their affair is a scam, and they were simply messing with Dawson. Natasha and Dawson reunite and he brings her to Capeside for Christmas. Knowing that she cheated on him with a fellow actor (Max Winter), Dawson questions Natasha's intentions, to which she becomes angry. Realizing that he's not in love with Natasha, he breaks up with her, and the two part on good terms as Natasha returns to Hollywood.

Meanwhile, Dawson's relationship with Pacey is better than it has been since the triangle began in the third season. Trusting Pacey to make his film savings grow, Dawson puts all the money he earned into a stock Pacey recommends. However, the stock falls through and both Dawson and Pacey are left with nothing. As a result, the two, once again, vow to no longer be friends. Joey, caught in the middle once again, helps reignite Dawson's plans to film his Untitled Screenplay whilst attempting to reunite her friends. Pacey gives Dawson all the money he'd collected (but not all that was owed). Dawson concedes that there may be hope for the two of them.

With Audrey playing the role of Ms. Jacobs, Harley as Joey and her boyfriend Patrick as the girl-crazed 15-year-old Pacey, Dawson, with Joey and Todd's help, begins filming his life story, adapted for the big screen.

==== Series finale ====
In 2008, Dawson is the executive producer and chief writer of the television program The Creek, a self-referential coming-of-age teen drama based on his adolescence in Capeside. While a young blonde boy portrays Dawson himself under the name "Colby", his two best friends appear as the neurotic "Sam" and heartbreaker "Petey." Returning to Capeside, Dawson learns that Jen is dying. Dawson helps Jen leave a video message for her young daughter Amy, and he and Joey reconcile their past agreeing that they are soulmates and that their relationship transcends both friendship and romance, an allusion to the opening scene where he tells Joey that their platonic bond transcends typical views on romance. They realize their relationship will endure "always," which is far more important to both of them than the form the relationship takes.

Kevin Williamson discussed the original ending of Dawson's Creek, stating the pairing was meant to be Joey and Dawson, but the writing staff who took over after his departure had pivoted the show away from this ending and he believed them ending the series as best friends and soul mates was most important. The series ends with Dawson in his office who receives a call from Pacey and Joey, congratulating him on the season finale episode of The Creek. Dawson tells them that he's going to meet with somebody tomorrow, whom Pacey and Joey are able to guess is Steven Spielberg, Dawson's idol.

== Notable relationships ==
- Jen Lindley
  - Girlfriend
    - First relationship:
      - Beginning: "Kiss" (1.03)
      - End: "Boyfriend" (1.08)
        - Reason: Jen breaks up with him when her ex-boyfriend comes into town.
    - Second relationship:
      - Beginning: "Hotel New Hampshire" (5.08)
      - End: "Highway To Hell" (5.17)
        - Reason: They both don't really feel anything romantic for each other anymore.
  - Fling:
    - Beginning: "High Risk Behavior" (2.10)
    - End: "Sex, She Wrote" (2.11)
      - Reason: They almost have sex, but don't go through with it.
- Joey Potter
  - Kiss
    - "Detention" (1.07)
      - Reason: They were dared to kiss each other despite him being with Jen.
    - "Coda" (4.23)
      - Reason: They kiss to mark the beginning of the next phase of their lives.
    - "High Anxiety" (5.06)
      - Reason: Joey kiss him to show that she still believes they can find each other in the future.
  - Girlfriend
    - First relationship:
      - Beginning: "Decisions" (1.13)
      - End: "The Dance" (2.06)
      - Reason: Joey breaks up with him because she wants to see if she can be her own person without him.
    - Second relationship:
      - Beginning: "A Perfect Wedding" (2.18)
      - End: "Parental Discretion Advised" (2.22)
        - Reason: Dawson makes Joey turn in her dad to the police by wearing a wire and Joey breaks up with Dawson because of it.
    - One-night stand:
      - Beginning: "The Kids Are Alright" (6.01)
      - End: "The Song Remains The Same" (6.02)
        - Reason: Joey finds out that Dawson had a girlfriend in California that he only broke up with the morning after they slept together. The possibility of a relationship ends.
- Eve
  - Fling
    - Beginning: "Like A Virgin" (3.01)
    - End: "None Of The Above" (3.03)
      - Reason: Dawson realizes how manipulative she is and breaks it off, and she leaves town.
- Gretchen Witter
  - Girlfriend
    - Beginning: "The Tao of Dawson" (4.11)
    - End: "Promicide" (4.20)
      - Reason: Gretchen breaks up with him because she doesn't see a future with him and she believes he's not over Joey.
- Amy Lloyd
  - Fling
    - Beginning: "100 Light Years from Home" (5.19)
    - End: "After Hours" (5.21)
- Natasha
  - Girlfriend
    - First relationship:
      - Beginning: Between "Swan Song" (5.23) and "The Kids Are Alright" (6.01)
      - End: "The Kids Are Alright" (6.01)
        - Reason: Dawson breaks up with her over the phone after having slept with Joey the night before.
    - Second relationship:
      - Beginning: "Spiderwebs" (6.08)
      - End: "Merry Mayhem" (6.10)
        - Reason: Natasha breaks it off because she never really sees them going far and it is more of a fling for her.

== Conception ==
Series creator Kevin Williamson loosely based the character on himself. When Williamson left the series after season two to work on other projects, the show struggled to find its footing with a slew of new writers trying to emulate Williamson's voice. Replacement showrunner Alex Ganza was fired mid season 3, and new showrunner Greg Berlanti eventually settled on fashioning a King Arthur-style love triangle between Dawson, Joey and Pacey — a decision which was credited with saving the show from flagging ratings.

Williamson eventually returned to the show to write the series finale, and although he initially planned to write Dawson ending up with his longtime on-and-off love interest Joey Potter, he made a decision to pivot during production. Instead, he was inspired to explore Dawson and Joey ending up together as platonic soulmates and subsequently decided to have Joey reunite romantically with Pacey Witter.

== Reception ==
Despite being the series' titular character, there was much criticism of Dawson's character during the series' initial run as well as retrospectively. At the time of Dawson's Creek original broadcast run, Dawson's character was seen as a departure from previous leading men of teen dramas such as Beverly Hills, 90210 and My So-Called Life, in part because he was a contrast to jocks and bad boy-types and had a sensitive, introspective nature. Television Without Pity, a TV recap website created to recap Dawson's Creek episodes, wrote, "In the early series, Dawson is sort of a doofus, but in the way most teens are. But then he became a score-keeping, judgmental, self-satisfied guy whose hair was an affront." Critics argued "Pacey [eventually] eclipsed Dawson as both the series' most relatable character and its moral centre."

Among the most criticized aspects of Dawson's character was a "misguided sense of ownership over women," as when he believes Jack stole Joey away from him in season two and later tries to "win" Joey by entering a sailing competition in season three. In an article for Vice, writer Sarit Luban wrote, "Dawson believes that women should be treated well and that he personally treats women well, which leads him to assume that he's a good match for any woman he sets his eyes on. When some nevertheless ignore or reject him, he feels slighted. The irony of Nice Guys like Dawson, of course, is that their entitlement is not nice."

== Van Der Beek's thoughts on Dawson Leery ==
James Van Der Beek joked he wouldn't want to be friends with Dawson in real life. He also commented that he was happy with the ending of the series and was glad that Joey and Dawson didn't end up together. Van Der Beek also spoofed his character in the 2000 comedy Scary Movie and in a sketch for Funny or Die called "Vandermemes".
