= Jen Lindley =

Character in Dawson's Creek

Jennifer Lindley
- Dawson's Creek character
- Michelle Williams as Jen Lindley
- First appearance: "Pilot" (episode 1.01)
- Last appearance: "...Must Come to an End" (episode 6.24)
- Created by: Kevin Williamson
- Portrayed by: Michelle Williams

In-universe information
- Full name: Jennifer Lindley
- Nicknames: Jen, Jennie, Lindley
- Occupation: Professional : Curator at Soho Art Gallery in New York City (formerly); Volunteer counselor at The Stand (formerly); Radio spaekerine (formerly); Hostess at Leery's Fresh Fish (formerly) Academic : New York University (formerly; graduated); Boston Bay College (formerly; during freshman and sophomore years); Capeside High School (formerly; graduated)
- Family: Amy Lindley (daughter); Evelyn Ryan (maternal grandmother); Mr. Ryan (maternal grandfather); Eve Whitman (maternal half-sister); Helen Ryan (mother); Theodore Lindley (father)
- Significant others: Love interests : Unnamed father of her daughter (formerly); Dawson Leery (ex-boyfriend); C.J. Braxton (ex-boyfriend); Charlie Todd (former fling); Henry Parker (ex-boyfriend); Ty Hicks (ex-boyfriend); Pacey Witter (former fling); Chris Wolfe (former fling); Cliff Elliot (former fling); Drue Valentine (former fling); Billy Konrad (ex-boyfriend) Friendships : Jack McPhee (best friend/soulmate); Pacey Witter (close friend); Joey Potter (close friend); Andrea McPhee (close friend); Dawson Leery (close friend); Audrey Liddell (friend); Abby Morgan (former friend, deceased); Drue Valentine (frenemy)
- Hometown: New York City, New York
- Residence: New York City, New York; Formerly: Capeside, Massachusetts

Jennifer "Jen" Lindley (c. May 1983 — May 14, 2008) was a principal character in the WB television drama Dawson's Creek, portrayed by Michelle Williams. Introduced in the pilot, Williams appeared as a regular for all six seasons.

== Background ==
Jennifer "Jen" Lindley grew up in New York, the only child of Theodore Lindley and Helen Ryan with whom she does not have a close relationship. Caught up in the city life of sex and drugs, at the age of 15, her parents sent her to live with her conservative Christian grandmother Evelyn Ryan (whom she calls "Grams") in Capeside. They often clash due to their differences but, as the series progresses, Grams softens her views and forms a strong bond with Jen. Jen quickly becomes close friends with Dawson and Pacey. She has a more complicated friendship with Joey, but through the course of the series they become good friends. In the season 1 episode "Boyfriend", which takes place approximately three months into her sophomore school year, Jen says she is sixteen years old, which makes her character a year older than the three other principal characters.

== Character arc ==
=== Season 1 ===
Jen is introduced in the pilot episode as arriving from New York City to live with her grandmother in Capeside, after her parents realized just how out of control she was. Jen initially provided a love interest for Dawson and the two casually dated throughout the first season, which caused tension between Jen and Joey Potter, Dawson's childhood friend and crush. However Jen and Dawson broke up when Jen's ex-boyfriend Billy came to Capeside to win her back and he revealed some of Jen's sordid past. She eventually decides her relationship with Dawson has become too intense too fast, and breaks things off. She comes to regret this decision, and is concerned when Dawson refuses to take her back immediately. Jen seeks comfort from him in the wake of her grandfather's illness and subsequent death.

=== Season 2 ===
In the aftermath of her grandfather's death, Jen becomes depressed and dismayed when Dawson begins dating Joey. She tries to seduce him and finds herself increasingly isolated as a result. She ends up striking up a friendship with Abby Morgan, a mean girl who everyone disliked, and they often drank and partied together, much to Grams' dismay. They fell out for a short while when a sailor docked in Capeside, who Abby was attracted to, chose to date Jen instead. During her sophomore year, Jen also briefly dated a conservative Christian, but broke up with him after he was revealed to be a homophobe (this came out while gay rumors were circulating about Jen's friend Jack McPhee.) She later re-befriended Abby who died shortly after from falling off a pier while drunk, which sends Jen into a depressive downward spiral. Grams kicked Jen out of the house due to her behaviour so she briefly stayed with the Leerys before she attempted a reconciliation with her parents, but they again rejected her. Jen then went to live with Jack, but eventually they decided to both move in with Grams.

=== Season 3 ===
While Jack moved out to live with Andie again, his relationship with Jen remained close. She attended cheerleader tryouts purely to denounce the extremely unpleasant head cheerleader, and she was also elected homecoming queen. Jen was courted by Capeside High's star freshman quarterback, Henry Parker and the two dated throughout most of Jen's junior year. Jen later entered a purely sexual "friends with benefits" relationship with Pacey; both agreed that there will be no emotion involved whatsoever. Pacey and Jen are nearly caught having sex in Dawson's room after he returns home from an appointment; he finds a condom on his bedroom floor and is suspicious about who Pacey is seeing. The gang later discover Pacey and Jen kissing. Joey overreacts and Jen suspects she likes Pacey, and Pacey and Jen decide their fling is not working and they are better off as friends. During the third season, Jen's mother unexpectedly shows up at Grams' house for Thanksgiving dinner. Jen is not happy to see her mother, especially when she discovers she has a half-sister Eve Whitman (who Dawson dated for a while). Jen takes it upon herself to help a struggling Dawson to pick himself up after the explosion of his friendships with Pacey and Joey.

=== Season 4 ===
Jen's senior year comprised much of the fourth season. Jen becomes Dawson's best friend and confidant, helping him move on from the events of last summer. Jen and Henry break up, and she became closer with Jack which almost results in a drunken sexual encounter on the school ski trip. One of Jen's old acquaintances from her days on the New York party scene, Drue Valentine, moved to Capeside to live with his mother, and brought an unhappy reminder of her past.

Before a rave one night, he offered her ecstasy, which Jen accepted from him but never took. Instead, a depressed Andie took the drug, which mixed with her medication caused her to gain a high fever and end up in hospital. This caused a massive rift between Jen and the rest of her friends, which was only healed after Andie told them that she was leaving for Italy.

While her friends were all applying to colleges, Jen was reluctant to do so; Jack, with Grams' help, eventually applied to several schools for her, using previous school work for the essays. Though she considers returning to New York for school, she decides to go to Boston with Jack instead. Jen also met Toby, an admittedly gay teen whom Jack finds strongly unattractive. However, Jen gets along with Toby and soon learns that he has a "thing" for Jack. After he makes it perfectly clear that he does not wish to take Toby to the gang's senior prom, Jen goes against Jack's wishes and tells Toby that Jack wants to ask him out. Jack gets even by setting Jen up with her old drug buddy, Drue as her prom date. While Jen and Drue seemingly reunite, Jen confesses to her old friend that she has changed her mind about attending college in New York.

In the season finale, Grams sells the house and decides to move to Boston with Jen and Jack. Jen shares a bittersweet goodbye with Dawson, who is also leaving Capeside.

=== Season 5 ===
The fifth season, which spanned Jen's freshman year in college, was somewhat tumultuous. Grams moved to Boston with Jen and Jack and the three lived together until Jack joined a fraternity, which (coupled with the alcohol abuse and academic decline it coincided with) created a rift in his relationship with Jen. While at Boston Bay Jen briefly dated musician Charlie and ran a school radio show, However she found out that Charlie was cheating on her and she comically made him confess---with the help of Charlie's other girlfriend Nora, Jen convinces Charlie to "shut-up and get naked" just before locking him out of his dorm room in a hallway full of students, humiliating him. They then burn all of his treasured belongings and exam notes.

After the death of Mitch Leery, Jen begins supporting Dawson after he and Joey struggle to connect. The two grow closer as Jen encourages Dawson to attend grief councilling and consider moving to Boston. Dawson in turn supports Jen in the aftermath of the Charlie situation; eventually Dawson invites Jen to attend the Hookset Film Festival in New Hampshire after he learns that his father entered him in the competition, using his film about now-deceased-director A.I. Brooks. Dawson wins first place, and jokingly thanks "his girlfriend Jen Lindley". The two have a sweet and romantic night together, and later sleep together. After losing his virginity to her, Dawson and Jen begin dating, much to the chagrin of Joey, and Jen convinces Dawson to move into Gram's attic in Boston. The relationship eventually fizzles out, although the two vow to remain friends.

During the gang's spring break trip to Florida, Jen finds Joey spending some quality time with her ex-boyfriend Charlie Todd. In trying to warn her, Jen's advice goes unheeded by Joey. In the meantime, Jen tries to have a serious conversation with Jack about his drinking problem.

At the end of the season, Jack relays to Jen that he has passed all of his classes, and the two friends prepare to take a vacation to Costa Rica. However, an unexpected phone call from Jen's parents in New York, ruin their plans. At first, Jen decides to spend the summer with her best friend, but when everyone collides at the airport in the finale, Dawson convinces Jen to go see her parents. She takes the next flight out to New York as Grams sneaks to Vegas with her boyfriend, Cliffton Smalls. Jen runs into Damage Ink director, Todd Carr, on the plane; the same director who fired Dawson from his internship at USC.

=== Season 6 ===
During the sixth and final season, Jen embarks on a relationship with C.J. who she meets at a campus cafe. Jack convinces her to call the peer counselling helpline where C.J. works to invite him to a Halloween party, but she forgot to mention to him that it was a costume party after he and his friend, David, show up in casual dress. Jack and Jen spend the evening trying to assess whether C.J. and David are a couple by separating them and discussing their dating lives. A delighted Jen discovers that David is gay but C.J. is not while a disheartened Jack discovers that C.J. is not interested in Jen.

Joey's roommate Audrey, ends up sleeping with C.J. when she gets drunk before a gig with Emma's band at Hell's Kitchen. Jen learns of C.J.'s sexual misadventures only after he tells her that he no longer dates. Upset, Jen leaves the situation, while C.J. gets into a fist fight with Pacey during a No Doubt concert. Having joined the helpline as a counsellor, Jen and C.J. grow closer and eventually begin dating.

In the meantime, Grams is diagnosed with breast cancer and decides not to tell Jen. When Grams gives in and tells Jen of her illness, Jen reacts poorly and dumps C.J. before they have to host a Loveliness Questionnaire with Drew Pinsky and Adam Carolla. When the pressure gets to be too much, Jen gives the hosting job to an ecstatic Audrey, and she and C.J. reconcile. Jen then calls on her mother Helen to talk things out with Grams, and so Grams can tell her own daughter about the cancer. Eventually, Grams' boyfriend, Bill Braxton (also C.J.'s uncle) unknowingly breaks the news to Jack and Helena when he tells Grams that she cannot give up the fight. Grams, Jen, and Jack decide to move to New York to live with Jen's mother while Grams undergoes treatment.

==== Series finale ====
In the two-part series finale, set in 2008, the gang learns of Jen's fatal heart condition, pulmonary congestion, after she faints during Gale Leery's third wedding. Jen, now the single mother of a one-year-old daughter, Amy, ends up hospitalized and reveals to Jack, her best friend, that there is nothing to be done to save her. Leaving Amy in Jack's care, Jen dies with Grams at her side on May 14, 2008.

== Reception ==
Creator Kevin Williamson said about Williams: "I remember when Michelle Williams walked in and auditioned for Jen. I had always envisioned her as the girl from the wrong side of the creek who at 15 comes to the creek with a checkered past and disrupts its flow. When she came in — she auditioned with when Jen goes in and sees her grandfather laying in the bed — she got really quiet and just sat there for a really long time as if this grandfather was sitting in front of her. She played it as if she were really broken. I saw Jen as this fallen angel, a broken bird, and Michelle tapped into that. She transformed herself into this broken child who just needed to be fixed. I knew I'd found Jen Lindley." The Guardian said Williams "was enigmatic, but also damaged and vulnerable."

There has been criticism surrounding Jen's death on the series finale. Many considered Jen's death a tragic ending to a character who was mistreated and underutilized during the entire series' run. Vulture stated, "we're repeatedly told via slut-shaming dialogue that Jen is a seductress or a 'barracuda,' but she walks like she's been on horseback for three days, in concrete panties — and the writers never did quite figure out what to do with the character, sending Jen on a series of downward-spiral arcs that landed like wet toilet paper."

In Grazia's article "Dawson's Creek, Jen Lindley, And The Betrayal Of The Noughties Bad Girl", writer Guy Pewsey discusses the misogynist aspects of her story arc. Pewsey says, "Are you a woman in Noughties television? Do you like to party? Enjoy a drink? Use recreational drugs? Like to rattle the headboard on occasion? You must be punished. While your male peers can screw up constantly, and the girl-next-door in your peer group can wander through life doe-eyed and unharmed, you're pretty much doomed. Jen was never going to survive Dawson's Creek. Even becoming a mother couldn't save her." Williamson previously explained his reasoning for the conclusion of Jen's story arc as such: "she always felt like the outsider, the misfit. She was always the person who didn't feel like she fit in. And I thought what a beautiful way to let her be the catalyst for everyone's turning events." Williamson argued Jen's death served to wake Dawson up from his work-induced haze and embrace life again, as well as to encourage Joey to resolve her increasingly dramatic love life and make a decision.

Lindley's character has been reassessed in recent years as "underappreciated" and received praise for her calling out of sexist tropes and her sex-positive views.

Williams, who was a 16-year-old teenager when Dawson's Creek began production, had previously acted in films and TV sitcoms but had her first major role in the series. Vulture said "you can see glimmers of Williams's potential" as Jen and The New York Times commended Williams as an earnest performer at the age of sixteen. Williams received two nominations for the YoungStar Award for Best Performance by a Young Actress in a Drama TV Series.

Williams commented on the experience of seeing fans' early distaste for the Jen character while she was a teenager at that time. Said Williams, "Jen did not inspire big crushes or big fan love. In fact, it was the opposite. I do remember a little website called IHateJen.com. It’s a hard thing to bear when you’re a 16-, 17-, 18-year-old girl and there’s a website dedicated to hating you and your character. It’s a struggle! It’s a funny thing when you’re developing your own identity and the identity of the character you play somehow becomes confused with your own. But now, I’m 37 and everything is fine.”

== Williams' thoughts on Dawson's Creek ==
In 2018, Entertainment Weekly organized a Dawson's Creek reunion with the original cast to celebrate the 20th anniversary of the series. For the occasion, Williams appeared on two covers of the magazine, one with Katie Holmes, James Van Der Beek and Joshua Jackson, her fellow lead actors; and the other with Busy Philipps, her best friend whom she met on the set of the show. Williams' declared, "I loved that we were able to get in there in those formative years for people. That's why people, I think, are so connected to it. When something affects you while you were growing up, it kind of stays in there forever. When you're so permeable and open and trying to figure out who you are and what's going on, whatever reaches you in those moments really becomes part of you." She also spoke about the fact people still talk to her about how Jen and Jack are a huge cultural reference on best friends.

In 2019, during a Variety's Actors on Actors interview with Patricia Clarkson while promoting her first television work in years, Fosse/Verdon, Williams called her time on Dawson's Creek "an incredible learning experience” and “very formative," but also spoke about the grueling schedule, saying, "It was a very different kind of television. We did 22 episodes a year, you'd be getting scripts sort of at the last minute and you had like zero input." She mentioned not having input on her character made her hesitant to return to television.
