= Songs from Dawson's Creek – Volume 2 =

Soundtrack album by Various Artists
- Released: October 3, 2000
- Genres: Pop; pop rock; folk
- Length: 53:37
- Labels: Columbia; Sony Music

Songs from Dawson's Creek – Volume 2 is the second soundtrack album for the teen drama series Dawson's Creek. Coinciding with television debut of the series's fourth season on The WB, it was released by Columbia Records and Sony Music on October 3, 2000 in the United States. Once again compromising a set of pop rock and folk pop songs, it features appearances by Evan & Jaron, Five for Fighting, The Jayhawks, Train, Wheatus, Jessica Andrews, Shawn Colvin, and Pete Yorn.

== Track listing ==
No.	Title	Performer(s)	Length
1.	"I Think I'm in Love With You"	Jessica Simpson	3:19
2.	"Crazy for This Girl"	Evan & Jaron	3:22
3.	"Respect"	Train	3:25
4.	"I'm Gonna Make You Love Me"	The Jayhawks	3:41
5.	"Givin' Up on You"	Lara Fabian	4:34
6.	"Superman (It's Not Easy)"	Five for Fighting	3:40
7.	"If I Am"	Nine Days	3:59
8.	"Never Saw Blue Like That"	Shawn Colvin	4:39
9.	"I Think God Can Explain"	Splender	3:55
10.	"Teenage Dirtbag"	Wheatus	4:03
11.	"Broken Boy"	Michal	3:54
12.	"Just Another"	Pete Yorn	3:13
13.	"Show Me Heaven"	Jessica Andrews	4:22
14.	"Daydream Believer"	Mary Beth Maziarz	3:30

== Charts ==
Chart (2000)	Peak position
Australian Albums (ARIA)	22
Austrian Albums (Ö3 Austria)	19
Belgian Albums (Ultratop Wallonia)	48
French Albums (SNEP)	38
US Billboard 200	59
