= Joey Potter =

Fictional character

- Dawson's Creek character
- Katie Holmes as Josephine Potter
- First appearance: "Pilot" (episode 1.01)
- Last appearance: "...Must Come to an End" (episode 6.24)
- Created by: Kevin Williamson
- Portrayed by: Katie Holmes

In-universe information
- Full name: Josephine Lynn Potter
- Nicknames: Joey (by everyone); Jo, Potter
- Occupation: Professional : Junior book editor in New York City (currently); Secretary for the Liddell's stockbroker company in Boston (formerly); Waitress at the Hell's Kitchen bar in Boston (formerly); Waitress at the Capeside Yacht Club (formerly); Employee at the Potter Bed & Breakfast (formerly); Sailor at Logan's Marina (formerly); Waitress at the Ice House restaurant (formerly) Academic : Worthington University (formerly; graduated in literature); Capeside High School (formerly; graduated) Hobbies : Writing (talented); Drawing and painting (talented); Singing
- Family: Mike Potter (father); Lillian Potter (mother; deceased); Bessie Potter (sister); Alexander Potter Wells (nephew)
- Significant others: Love interests : Pacey John Witter (boyfriend as of “...Must Come to An End”); Christopher (ex-boyfriend); Eddie Doling (ex-boyfriend); Dawson Leery (ex-boyfriend); Unnamed boy in Capeside (ex-boyfriend); Professor David Wilder (former fling); Charlie Todd (former fling); Arthur "A.J." Muller Junior (ex-boyfriend); Jack McPhee (ex-boyfriend); Anderson Crawford (former fling) Friendships : Dawson Leery (best friend/platonic soulmate); Jennifer Lindley (Friend, deceased); Andrea McPhee (Friend); Jack McPhee (Friend); Audrey Liddell (Friend, College roommate); Pacey Witter (Friend)
- Relatives: Bodie Wells (brother-in-law)
- Hometown: Capeside, Massachusetts
- Residence: New York City, New York; Formerly: Boston, Massachusetts

Josephine "Joey" Lynn Potter (born 1983) is a fictional character in the WB television drama Dawson's Creek, played by Katie Holmes. Joey is the only principal character to appear in all episodes of the series, which ran from 1998 to 2003.

Joey, created by Kevin Williamson based on a childhood friend, is a tomboyish teenager growing up in the fictional town of Capeside in Massachusetts. The series chronicles her journey from adolescence into adulthood, focusing in particular on her complex and evolving relationship with childhood friend Dawson Leery (James Van Der Beek).

== Background ==
In an official companion book for the show, Joey Potter is described as "a headstrong, vibrant, wily, sultry, and determined go-getter. And yet, in a gloriously contradictory manner, in spite of her tough-as-nails exterior demeanor, Joey's also a frail, sometimes uncertain, emotionally sensitive, in-need-of-love person."

Joey has been best friends with Dawson Leery since they were in third grade, and considers him "her family." She spent much of her early childhood at the Leery house, and Dawson was a constant comforting presence during traumatic events in her childhood. Joey's mother had died of breast cancer when Joey was thirteen and her father, Mike (Gareth Williams), was in prison for drug trafficking. Joey is raised by her unmarried and pregnant sister Bessie (Nina Repeta), who is about ten years older than Joey and runs the Ice House restaurant where Joey works as a waitress.

Dawson and Joey spend many nights bonding over films and TV shows in his bedroom, which Joey accesses via a ladder into his room. She has also known Pacey Witter her whole life, though they only tolerate each other due to their friendships with Dawson until high school.

== Character arc ==
=== Season 1 ===
In season one, Joey is the "girl next door." She is confused by her growth into a teenager and her developing feelings for her longtime best friend Dawson, who believes he is her soulmate.

She immediately becomes jealous when Jen Lindley arrives and steals Dawson's attention. She is intimidated by Jen, who grew up in New York, and feels competitive with her. She lives with her pregnant sister Bessie and works for her at the Ice House, the Potter family restaurant. She is frustrated with having to deal with work and taking care of her sister along with significant helpings of teenage angst. Nonetheless, Joey manages to be helpful with the birth of Bessie's son, Alexander, as does their critical neighbor, Evelyn Ryan (Mary Beth Peil). One day she is convinced to compete in a local beauty pageant so she can win the prize, which is a scholarship for college tuition. She ultimately does not win the pageant, but when she sings the song "On My Own" from Les Misérables on stage, Dawson finally sees past his "best friend" image of Joey and recognizes her romantic feelings towards him. At the end of the season, she receives the opportunity to spend her summer in Paris, but rejects it in favor of staying in Capeside with Dawson after she and Dawson kiss.

=== Season 2 ===
At the start of the season, she and Dawson begin dating, but Joey struggles with figuring out her own identity outside of their relationship. During a full moon, her co-worker Jack McPhee kisses her. Dawson finds out during a school dance and punches Jack. Distraught, Joey seeks Dawson out to apologize, but also decides she needs to take a break from him to "find herself".

Joey immediately throws herself into a relationship with Jack, which becomes confusing when Jack is outed as gay. Joey begins to lean on Dawson for support as Jack struggles and eventually confirms his sexuality to Joey. Joey struggles with readjusting to single life. Joey's father is released from prison and comes back into her life. At first, this change is uneasy, but the two heal their rift.

After Dawson supports Joey through this uneasy period, she apologizes to him, thanks him for putting up with her, and kisses him. Their reignited relationship is put at risk, however, when Dawson finds out that Joey's father is dealing cocaine. After a fire at the restaurant which was started by rivals of Joey's father, Dawson tells his parents who advise him he needs to go to the police. He tells Joey first and convinces her to work with the police, and she eventually agrees and gets a confession from her father by wearing a wire.

Feeling guilt at betraying her father, she lashes out at Dawson. She breaks up with him and tells him she doesn't even want to know him and that she will never forgive him.

=== Season 3 ===
After Dawson returns from visiting his mom over the summer, Joey regrets breaking up with him and offers herself to him. However, Dawson rejects her, fearing another blowout will wreck their friendship permanently. Dawson asks Pacey Witter to keep an eye on the dejected Joey.

Joey takes a job at a Logan's Marina, where she receives unwanted sexual advances from her supervisor, Rob Logan.

Joey struggles with Dawson keeping his distance from her and attempts to heal the rift in their shaky friendship. Meanwhile, she finds herself progressively spending more time with Pacey. Joey has a brief relationship with a college student, A.J. Moller (Robin Dunne). This relationship makes Pacey jealous, and after she breaks up with A.J., Pacey declares his feelings for Joey and kisses her. Though Joey is initially angry at Pacey for kissing her with no warning, she forgives him after he apologizes for potentially putting their friendship at risk.

Pacey joins Dawson, Joey, and Andie on a spring break trip to the home of Dawson's aunt, Gwen (Gail's sister). Blossoming tension between Pacey and Joey prompts Pacey to ask Joey whether she reciprocates his feelings. Joey admits she felt a spark after he kissed her, which leads Pacey to kiss her again. They are caught by Aunt Gwen, but she keeps their secret while also warning Joey not to be careless with Dawson's heart. Though Joey is fearful of hurting Dawson, she realizes she cannot fight her feelings and embraces Pacey in a kiss. The two begin a secret romantic relationship.

Joey grows more anxious the longer the relationship is kept secret. When Jen accidentally tells Dawson first, he reacts furiously. Dawson confronts her and Pacey, ends his friendship with Pacey, and gives Joey an ultimatum between dating Pacey and saving her friendship with him. Joey tearfully ends things with Pacey in an effort to preserve her lifelong friendship with Dawson, leaving all three of the friends alone and devastated.

Dawson and Joey begin to converse again; however, Joey is dismayed that Dawson considers his friendship with Pacey forever destroyed. Dawson decides to win Joey back by competing in a sailing race with Pacey and throwing an alternative prom with Joey as his date. However, when Dawson witnesses Joey and Pacey share a romantic dance, he leaves devastated.

In the season finale, Joey confesses to Dawson that whilst she considers their friendship her first priority, if she thought he might forgive her then she might have continued to pursue a romantic relationship with Pacey. Dawson eventually urges Joey to follow her heart, and Joey rushes off to tell Pacey that she is in love with him before he departs for a summer at sea on his boat. She joins Pacey aboard his boat, the True Love, and the two then sail off into the sunset.

=== Season 4 ===
Joey returns to Capeside with Pacey from their summer at sea, madly in love but growing more and more preoccupied with thoughts of Dawson. Joey reaches out to Dawson with a symbolic present, and although it appears he is moving on from the coupling up of his two best friends, he appears disinterested in repairing their friendship and unsure if he wants Joey in his life at all, which leaves her devastated and determined to fix their lifelong friendship.

Joey discovers Pacey has returned to academic probation after irresponsibly skipping summer school, while Joey dreams of admittance to the fictional Worthington College in Boston. Joey and Pacey's relationship begins to become strained by Joey's determination to rebuild her friendship with Dawson and her prioritization of his feelings over their relationship. She struggles with watching Dawson move on romantically with Gretchen, Pacey's older sister. She is eventually relieved and delighted when Dawson starts to soften his stance and confiding in her again.

On a ski trip with the senior class, Joey finally gives in and sleeps with Pacey. She later runs into Dawson whilst walking through Capeside, and is delighted when he agrees to spend the night with her walking around Capeside and talking. Dawson eventually asks her if she has slept with Pacey, which Joey denies.

Gretchen discovers Joey's lie and confronts her over it, to which Joey reacts defensively and possessively. Gretchen also informs Pacey, which further strains his relationship with Joey.

Joey is admitted to the prestigious Worthington College but discovers she won't receive enough financial aid. When Dawson offers to front her a payment from Mr. Brooks' inheritance, she admits to Dawson she lied about having slept with Pacey. Dawson accepts her apology, reaffirming the survival and importance of their bond. She accepts the money from Dawson to attend Worthington.

After Joey returns from a trip to New York with Jen, she discovers from Gretchen that Pacey was arrested for public drunkenness. She also suspects she may be pregnant. Bessie learns about Joey's pregnancy scare and argues with her, claiming she is not ready to have a baby if she is pregnant and that she has an immature boyfriend. Joey defends herself by saying that whatever happens in her life will be different compared to Bessie's path to early motherhood. Joey learns from a pregnancy test that she is not pregnant, but the situation draws the sisters closer together. When Joey finally reaches Pacey on the phone, she doesn't tell him about the pregnancy scare, while he does not tell her about his arrest.

Pacey grows increasingly frustrated by the belief that he's holding Joey back from her ambitions, and grows more insecure over his perceived "worthlessness" in their relationship. After seeing Dawson and Joey dancing happily at prom, Pacey explodes at Joey in front of all their peers, leaving her crying and embarrassed. She and Pacey end their relationship. She seeks solace in her reignited friendship with Dawson, and is disappointed that Pacey leaves for the Caribbean as a crew member on a boat.

During the month after graduation, Joey starts to get over Pacey but becomes increasingly dismayed at Dawson's impending departure for California, where he will be attending film school. On Dawson's last night in Capeside, he and Joey both feel underwhelmed at their initial goodbye and seek each other out.

After watching E.T. and reminiscing about the highs and lows of the last four years, Joey tearfully confesses her appreciation for Dawson and their friendship; somehow their bond survived everything, including her failed relationship with Pacey. She declares him incredible, compares their friendship to magic, and asks him to stay. He gently reinforces his need to get out of Capeside and start living his life, and they share a goodbye kiss.

=== Season 5 ===
Joey begins her first semester at Worthington University in Boston, where she meets and tolerates her new roommate Audrey Liddell (Busy Philipps). Joey and Dawson remain in touch but struggle with interpreting their complicated friendship after their goodbye kiss. Dawson eventually drops out of USC to move to Boston, which leaves Joey excited about the future. Meanwhile, Joey discovers Pacey's presence in Boston and greets him, wanting to try to be friends again and reintegrate him into their friendship group.

Throwing everyone for a loop, Mitch is killed in a car accident. Joey attempts to support a struggling Dawson as he makes arrangements and holds things together for his family. Joey's attempts at comforting Dawson clash with his needs, and he asks to be alone. Upon returning to her dorm room in Boston, a crying Joey is comforted by Audrey.

Joey struggles to support Dawson in the coming months and becomes worried when he begins pulling away and leaning on Jen for support. Whilst Jen and Dawson are away for the weekend, Joey catches Jack in a plan to get one of his fraternity brothers in bed with Audrey during the frat's Winter Formal. At a group dinner, she is shocked and secretly devastated when the gang catches Dawson and Jen returning from a blissful weekend away together, whereupon it is concluded they have slept together. Joey confronts Dawson over their failing friendship and is devastated when he confirms he needs space away from her.

Joey later joins the band, Aggressive Mediocrity, as lead singer with Jen's cheating ex, Charlie Todd (Chad Michael Murray). They embark on a whirlwind romance before she tells him to leave to pursue his dream of being a touring musician. She has an unforgettable run-in with a mugger who gets hit by a car shortly after robbing her at gunpoint. However, when she is requested to be at his side in the hospital, Joey discovers that the mugger is also a drug addict, and has a young daughter, Sammie, with his wife, Grace. When the mugger dies with Joey at his side, she returns to the waiting room, all of her belongings returned, including the money. Thinking of Sammie, whose situation reminds her of the relationship she has with her own father, Joey leaves all the money hidden in Grace's backpack.

In the aftermath of the incident, Joey is delighted when a concerned and terrified Dawson begins spending time with her again, and she eventually confides in him about her complicated relationship with her professor. Their friendship blooms further after his relationship with Jen ends, and she urges him to join her and their friends for spring break in Florida.

After the semester ends, Joey returns to Capeside with Audrey in tow, and is shocked to discover Dawson had traveled to Florida to reignite their romantic relationship over spring break. Her delight is mellowed by news that Dawson is returning to L.A, and when she confronts Dawson over Florida and he confesses to her that his feelings for her have returned, she rejects him out of fear of holding him back from his life.

After reading a goodbye note Dawson left for her, she rushes to the airport to intercept him, declaring her love for him but convincing him to go start his life. She passionately kisses him and sends him off. As she goes to get a refund for her gate ticket, she is again offered the chance to go to Paris, and the audience is left hanging.

=== Season 6 ===
It is revealed that Joey didn't end up going to Paris, but went home to Capeside. She had a fling but ended it after he declared he liked her. She hangs out with her friends and is surprised that no one has remembered her birthday. After not talking all summer, she and Dawson meet up and have an incredibly romantic evening. After Dawson surprises her with a birthday present, they kiss and end up sleeping together multiple times over the next day.

After spending the day together, Joey discovers Dawson has had a casual relationship whilst in California. Despite having her own summer fling, Joey freaks out and uses it as an excuse to push him away again, leaving them both devastated. She later caters his film set and nearly gets him fired. They tearfully part ways, hoping with time and space they will be able to salvage their friendship.

She takes a job as a waitress at Hell's Kitchen, with the help of aspiring drummer, Emma Jones. Joey eventually falls for the bartender, Eddie Doling (Oliver Hudson). They both have a love for writing and literature, but it turns out that he is not officially a student at Worthington, as his family was too poor to afford the tuition.

At Christmas, Joey brings Eddie to the Leery household, where an intoxicated Audrey calls out her, Dawson, and Pacey's complicated history. Dawson and Joey share their first conversation in months, finding solace in each other's company.

After Christmas, Eddie disappears without telling Joey, going back to Worcester to live with his parents. In trying to find him, Joey gets some help from Harley Hetson—the 15-year-old, alienated, headstrong daughter of her snobbish and somewhat misogynist English professor, Greg Hetson (Roger Howarth), whom Joey clashes with several times during the entire season. Harley lies, telling Eddie that Joey was pregnant with his child in order to lure him back to Boston.

Joey and Pacey share a kiss at his apartment during a party. After being locked overnight in a K-Mart together, they discuss their past and current relationship. How they feel uncomfortable talking about sex with each other or how they never discuss their past and how the fact they never had closure impacts them. In an intimate moment Joey shaves his beard. When they go to sleep she tells him a fantasy she had when she was a teenager. In the fantasy they would be castaways in an idyllic island, living their love away from everyone. They share a bittersweet kiss after her confession. Each admits that they miss the other.

However, when Eddie returns from California, Joey ends things with Pacey and reunites with him. Soon, she realizes things are not working with Eddie and the best thing for her is to spend sometime alone thinking about her life.

Joey returns to Capeside and is delighted to read Dawson's new screenplay. She visits the Leery house and reignites her friendship with Dawson. After a great day together, she is devastated at Pacey's revelation of losing Dawson's money. She tries to keep them calm, but they explode at each other again, reigniting their years-old feud and leaving all three alone and devastated once again.

Joey takes it upon herself to pick up a devastated and despondent Dawson and manages to gather enough hands and equipment for him to begin production. When Pacey tries to use her as an in-between to give him money, Joey refuses to get in the middle again. She spends her last night in Capeside with Dawson, before finally flying to Paris. Before leaving she secretly schemes to get Pacey and Dawson together, hoping her absence will help them to finally repair their friendship without her in the middle.

==== Series finale ====
The final two episodes are set approximately five years after the season finale. Joey is a junior editor living in New York with her writer boyfriend, Christopher (Jeremy Sisto). Joey returns to Capeside for Gail Leery's wedding to her new husband, which her old high school friends are attending.

The five friends reunite at Pacey's restaurant to reminisce about the past. Afterwards, Joey once again finds herself at Dawson's house, feeling like she didn't get enough alone time with her oldest friend. The two talk at length about their lives and relationships, cementing their friendship once again. She sleeps over, like she has so many times before, before leaving to prepare for the wedding.

During Gail's wedding reception, Joey and Pacey kiss (reigniting lingering feelings between the two), but the moment is interrupted when Jen collapses. It is later discovered that Jen has a deadly heart condition. The night she finds out, she and Dawson comfort each other.

Joey, Pacey and Dawson each play important roles in Jen's last days. Joey comforts a distraught Dawson after he helps Jen film a video for her daughter Amy, whilst Jen insists Joey deal with her feelings and decide what she wants once and for all. Joey ends her relationship with Christopher. She finds herself at Pacey's restaurant and the two have an honest conversation. Whilst he is prepared to let her go, she stops him. Joey tells him that she loves Dawson, she acknowledges that he is her soulmate, he is tied to her childhood, a love that is pure, eternally innocent and necessary to her life.

She also confesses her love for Pacey, which confuses him. They are interrupted before she can clarify.

Joey visits Dawson at the Leery house, where he is crying whilst remembering Jen's first day in Capeside. The two discuss work, love, and life, and both verbalise the importance of their bond to their lives. Dawson acknowledges that whether or not they end up together - "In some ungodly way... its always gonna be you and me". Joey declares Dawson her soulmate, and as they watch her nephew and his younger sister play like Joey and Dawson did so many years ago, Joey tearfully tells him she loves him. He reciprocates, and through her tears she declares -

“You and me, always.”

They smile and cry, delighted that their childhood bond has survived the complications of growing up.

—EPILOGUE—

Weeks later, whilst watching the season finale of “The Creek” from Joey's New York apartment, it is revealed that Joey and Pacey have reconciled and are apparently living together.

They call Dawson immediately after, having reconciled their friendships. Dawson reveals that tomorrow he is going to meet his hero, Steven Spielberg, and Pacey and Joey converse ecstatically with him as the camera pans to a photograph of Dawson, Joey, Jen and Pacey from Season 4.

== Holmes' thoughts on Joey Potter ==
Actress Katie Holmes has said she related to Joey and that the producers acknowledged the similarities. Holmes said, "I think [the producers] saw that. I come from a small town. I was a tomboy. Joey tries to be articulate and deny that she doesn't have a lot of experience in life. Her life parallels mine, which is all about new everything—relationships, personal perceptions—and about being guarded." Holmes filmed the pilot of Dawson's Creek in Wilmington, North Carolina, during spring break of her senior year of high school in 1997. When the show was picked up by The WB, Holmes moved to Wilmington, where the show filmed.

Holmes admitted she struggled with the show's trademark hyper-articulate dialogue, saying, "Sometimes before we read a script, I have to get my dictionary and call people to make sure I'm pronouncing some of the words correctly." The show brought her stardom abroad and in her hometown of Toledo, Ohio, where she was named grand marshal of the Thanksgiving Day parade in November 1998.

Holmes is the only actor to appear in all 128 episodes of Dawson's Creek. When the series ended, Holmes commented, "It was very difficult for me to leave Wilmington, to have my little glass bubble burst and move on. I hate change. On the other hand, it was refreshing to play someone else." Holmes confirmed that, as often happens on soaps, the character was a caricature of the actor:

I miss her spirit, and her spunk, and I miss her anxiety. She always had these long speeches about her fears and her future and love. It was a great tool for me personally because I got to get it all out. I was able to psychoanalyze all of it everyday [sic?] with her and then I wouldn't have to do it on my own. So much of me is in Joey and it really felt like I grew up on television.

== Reception ==
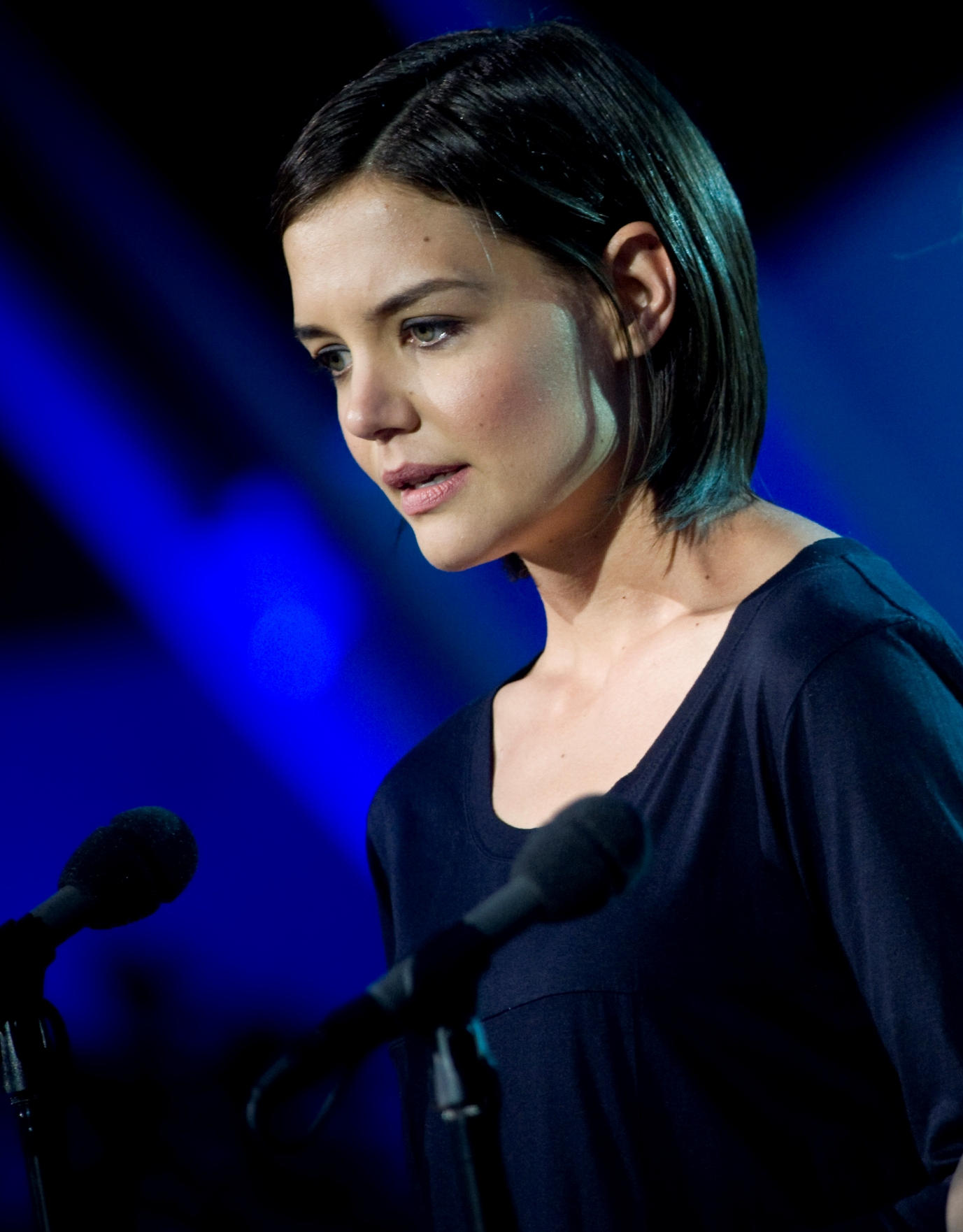
Katie Holmes received high acclaim during second season and has since been referred to as the series' central character by the media.

In 2002, GQ described Joey as "kind of an uptight fussbudget—one who's always twisted up over doing the right thing and bungling-up ways to hook up with her crush and across the creek neighbor, Dawson." Holmes was featured on the cover of Rolling Stone in September 1998. In a review of the series pilot, Variety said Holmes "is a confident young performer who delivers her lines with slyness and conviction."

Life magazine commented, "As Joey, Holmes has had seismic influences on teen life... Through it all, Joey has managed to hang on to her integrity... The show—and Katie's character in particular—has touched a nerve." Critics have argued, "Joey Potter, the tomboyish underdog who lost her mother to cancer and her father to jail, became the show's anchor," a turning point that was marked, according to show writer Jeffrey Stepakoff, by Greg Berlanti's suggestion to have Pacey and Joey kiss in season 3. Writers have also noted how Joey's character arc begins with a very deferential relationship to Dawson, gradually evolving to the point where she ultimately realizes her own agency and independence.

Joey's season 3 arc with Pacey Witter is often praised in pop culture as being one of the top TV romances. Jezebel said "their screwball dynamic, coupled with [the] actors'...untapped chemistry and an intricately plotted courtship subverted everything expected of the show. It unsurprisingly still resonates with so many millennial women who grew up watching the series. There was a time when we had come for the angst, but now we were staying for the romance." They were also included in TV Guide's list of "The Best TV Couples of All Time."
