= Nina Repeta =

American actress (born 1967)

- Born: Nina Lynn Blanton; September 10, 1967 (age 58); Shelby, North Carolina, U.S.
- Occupations: Actress and Singer
- Years active: 1993–present
- Spouse: Mike Repeta (?–present)
- Children: 1

Nina Repeta (/ˈnaɪnə rəˈpɛtə/; born September 10, 1967) is an American actress best known for her role as Bessie Potter on the television drama Dawson's Creek, which aired from 1998 to 2003.

She attended East Carolina University with Kevin Williamson, the creator of Dawson's Creek and most of her credits are in productions shot, as Dawson's Creek was, in Wilmington, North Carolina. Among them are Divine Secrets of the Ya-Ya Sisterhood and Matlock. Her first screen appearance was in 1994 with the George Lucas film Radioland Murders.

In addition to acting, Repeta is a singer.

== Personal life ==
Nina and her husband, camera operator Mike Repeta, had a son, actor Banks Repeta, in 2008.

Nina often sings with the Masonboro Baptist Church praise band during the 9:00 worship service on Sunday mornings.

== Filmography ==
Year	Title	Role	Notes
1993	Matlock	Shirley Hutchinson; Waitress; Linda Maxwell	Episode: "The Mark"; Episode: "The Fatal Seduction: Parts 1 & 2"; Episode: "The Conspiracy"
1994	Radioland Murders	Member, The Miller Sisters	
1995	Matlock	Kathy Bridges	Episode: "The Heist"
1996	A Kiss So Deadly	Waitress	TV movie
1996	A Step Toward Tomorrow	Monica	
1997	The Three Lives of Karen	Glenda	TV movie
1997	Buried Alive II	Sherry	TV movie
1997	Bloodmoon	Megan O'Hara	
1998	Ambushed	Mary Natter	
1998–2003	Dawson's Creek	Bessie Potter	88 episodes
1999	CI5: The New Professionals	Amy	Episode: "First Strike"
2002	Divine Secrets of the Ya-Ya Sisterhood	Lady at Gas Station	
2002	The Angel Doll	Clerk	
2005	Palmetto Pointe	Mrs. Gail	Episode: "Off to the Pointe"
2011	Murder Biz	Nancy	Completed
