= Dawson's Creek =

American teen drama television series (1998–2003)

- Genre: Teen drama; Romance
- Created by: Kevin Williamson
- Showrunners: Kevin Williamson (seasons 1–2); Alex Gansa (briefly in season 3); Greg Berlanti (seasons 3–4, replaced Alex Gansa); Tom Kapinos (seasons 5–6)
- Starring: James Van Der Beek; Michelle Williams; Joshua Jackson; Katie Holmes; Mary-Margaret Humes; John Wesley Shipp; Mary Beth Peil; Nina Repeta; Kerr Smith; Meredith Monroe; Busy Philipps
- Theme music composer: Paula Cole (American broadcast, streaming 2021–); Jann Arden (DVD, streaming services and Norway and Puerto Rico releases)
- Opening theme: "I Don't Want to Wait" by Paula Cole (American broadcast, re-recording for streaming 2021–); "Run Like Mad" by Jann Arden (DVD, streaming services and Norway and Puerto Rico releases)
- Composers: Danny Lux; Stephen Graziano; Mark Mothersbaugh (season 3); Adam Fields (vast majority); Dennis McCarthy
- Country of origin: United States
- Original language: English
- No. of seasons: 6
- No. of episodes: 128 (list of episodes)

Production
- Executive producers: Deborah Joy LeVine; Kevin Williamson; Paul Stupin; Greg Berlanti; Tom Kapinos; Greg Prange
- Production locations: Wilmington, North Carolina; Cape Cod, Massachusetts
- Camera setup: Single-camera
- Running time: 45 minutes
- Production companies: Outerbanks Entertainment (Note: Seasons 2–6.); Sony Pictures Television (Note: Known as Columbia TriStar Television from seasons 1–5 and Columbia TriStar Domestic Television from seasons 5–6.)

Original release
- Network: The WB
- Release: January 20, 1998 – May 14, 2003

Related
- Young Americans; Kavak Yelleri

Dawson's Creek is an American teen drama television series about the lives of a close-knit group of friends in the fictional town of Capeside, Massachusetts, beginning in high school and continuing into college. It aired from January 20, 1998, to May 14, 2003, for six seasons. The series started out starring James Van Der Beek as Dawson Leery; Katie Holmes as his best friend and love interest, Joey Potter; Joshua Jackson as their friend Pacey Witter; and Michelle Williams as Jen Lindley, a New York City arrival to Capeside.

The show was created by Kevin Williamson and premiered on The WB as a mid-season replacement. It was produced by Columbia TriStar Television, renamed Sony Pictures Television before the final season, and was filmed in Wilmington, North Carolina.

Along with Buffy the Vampire Slayer and 7th Heaven, Dawson's Creek became one of the flagship shows for The WB and launched its main cast to international stardom. The show placed at No. 90 on Entertainment Weekly's "New TV Classics" list in 2007. It has also been credited with kicking off a boom of teen-centered shows in the late 1990s that continued into the 2000s.

== Premise ==
Dawson Leery is an introspective 15-year-old aspiring filmmaker in the small New England town of Capeside, Massachusetts. Since childhood, he has been best friends with Josephine "Joey" Potter, who routinely comes over to his house through a ladder into his bedroom for movie-watching and platonic sleepovers. Tomboy Joey, who lost her mother to cancer and whose father is in prison for drug trafficking, lives with her older sister Bessie, who runs the restaurant The Icehouse.

Dawson works at a video rental store with his other best friend Pacey Witter, an underachieving class clown who occasionally squabbles with Joey. Dawson and Joey dance around a growing attraction to each other, but their dynamic shifts with the arrival of Jen Lindley, who has moved to Capeside from New York City to live with her grandparents. The series explores the characters' coming-of-age, dealing with topics such as first love, death, coming out, homophobia, class differences, racism, drug and alcohol addiction, depression, teenage pregnancy, abortion, consent, abuse, mental health, and divorce.

== Series overview ==
=== Episodes ===
Season	Episodes	Originally released	
Season	Episodes	First released	Last released
1	13	January 20, 1998	May 19, 1998
2	22	October 7, 1998	May 26, 1999
3	23	September 29, 1999	May 24, 2000
4	23	October 4, 2000	May 23, 2001
5	23	October 10, 2001	May 15, 2002
6	24	October 2, 2002	May 14, 2003

=== Season 1 (1998) ===
The first season covers a love triangle between Dawson, Joey, and Jen, which some critics have compared to the love triangle between Archie Comics characters Archie, Betty, and Veronica. Some episodes feature homages to movies such as The Breakfast Club and some reference Kevin Williamson's work on Scream. Jen's reasons for moving to Capeside are revealed – she was acting "too sexual" as a result of being raped by an older man who got her drunk when she was just twelve. Pacey aims to lose his virginity and has an affair with a new teacher at Capeside High School. Dawson must cope with the news his mother Gail has had an affair, and then witness his parents' attempts to recover from this.

=== Season 2 (1998–1999) ===
The second season takes place during the characters' second half of their sophomore year. Siblings Andie and Jack McPhee move to Capeside and enroll at the high school. The type-A achiever Andie becomes romantically involved with Pacey and helps him to become more motivated. It is revealed that her older brother has died but her mother sometimes acts as if he is still alive. Andie seems to be responsible for caring for her and protecting her at such times, as her father is absent. Pacey becomes a rock for Andie as it is revealed she struggles with mental illness herself. Joey finds herself drawn to Jack, who initially reciprocates her feelings, but comes to realize he is gay, which puts him at odds with homophobic classmates and an intolerant father. Jen befriends "bad girl" Abby Morgan and goes down a path of self-destruction. Dawson must deal with the divorce of his parents, Mitch and Gail.

=== Season 3 (1999–2000) ===
The third season saw the beginning of the characters' junior year and a blossoming romance between Joey and Pacey. When Dawson discovers his two friends have become a couple behind his back, he is dejected and angry. Dawson and Pacey become rivals for Joey's affection. Joey tries to repair her friendship with Dawson, but at the end of the season, Dawson realizes he does not want to hold Joey back, so he urges her to go and join Pacey, who is sailing down the coast for the summer. Jen is pursued by freshman football player Henry Parker and initially finds him immature but grows to return his feelings. Jack tries to find his first gay experience, while also juggling football and trying to find a new place to live after his father sells the only home he knows.

=== Season 4 (2000–2001) ===
The fourth season takes place during the characters' senior year of high school and deals with Joey and Pacey's ups and downs as a couple. Their relationship is tested by differing post-high school plans, Joey's friendship with Dawson, and Pacey's insecurity. Jen learns that Henry wants to break up with her but he does not say this to her face. Andie almost dies at a rave when she takes ecstasy that was in Jen's possession via a new boy, Drue, whom Jen used to know in New York. The drug conflicts with Andie's prescribed medication. The incident fractures Jen's friendship with Jack and the group. Dawson starts to date Gretchen, Pacey's older sister who has moved back to Capeside.

=== Season 5 (2001–2002) ===
The fifth season follows most of the characters leaving Capeside to begin new lives in big cities. In Los Angeles, Dawson attends film school at the University of Southern California but starts to have second thoughts. After arguing with his parents over dropping out, his father dies, leaving Dawson more confused about his future. In Boston, Joey, Jack and Jen navigate their freshman year of college at the fictional institutions, Worthington University and Boston Bay College. Pacey finds himself adrift after working on a yacht all summer but enters the restaurant business when he takes a job as a cook at a trendy restaurant in Boston. Jack joins a fraternity and embraces life as an openly gay college student, but it puts his relationship with his boyfriend Tobey under strain. Joey struggles to adjust to life as a college student but makes a new friend. Jen finds herself drawn into a whirlwind relationship and also supports Dawson when he attends grief counseling.

=== Season 6 (2002–2003) ===
In the sixth and final season, Dawson moves to Boston and begins to work on a low-budget film project that echoes his life in Capeside. Jen must deal with her parents' impending divorce, while Jack faces sexual harassment from a professor. Joey clashes throughout the season with an egotistical writing professor. Pacey embarks on a new career which comes as a surprise to everyone when he takes a job as a stock broker in a small brokerage firm in Boston. The two-part finale, which is set in the year 2008, finds everyone reunited in Capeside for a special wedding, but the happy reunion is cut short after the group learns that one of their own has been harboring a heartbreaking secret. In the midst of the tragedy, old scores are settled, new relationships blossom, and new ventures are chosen for a better future.

== Cast and characters ==
- James Van Der Beek as Dawson Leery, the titular character of the show. An introspective dreamer, he aspires to be a filmmaker just like his hero Steven Spielberg. Throughout the series he has romantic relationships with his childhood friend Joey and his neighbor Jen.
- Michelle Williams as Jen Lindley, a rich girl from New York who was exiled to Capeside by her parents to live with her grandparents in the house next door to Dawson's. She was sexually abused at 12 and has since had a wild girl reputation which she resents. Often sarcastic.
- Joshua Jackson as Pacey Witter, Dawson's wisecracking best friend who is seen as an underachiever by his toxic and abusive family. Apparently light-hearted, Pacey has a hidden sad and romantic side.
- Katie Holmes as Joey Potter, Dawson's best friend. A tomboy, Joey often serves as a realistic voice of reason to the more idealistic Dawson but she can also be suspicious and has a short temper.
- Mary-Margaret Humes as Gail Leery (seasons 1–4; recurring seasons 5–6), Dawson's mother. She works as an anchorwoman at the Capeside news station, later leaving journalism to start the restaurant Leery's Fresh Fish.
- John Wesley Shipp as Mitchell "Mitch" Leery (seasons 1–4; guest season 5), Dawson's father and Gail's on-and-off-again husband. He is initially unemployed but then starts working at Capeside High School as a substitute teacher, guidance counselor, and football coach. He later becomes the co-owner of Leery's Fresh Fish.
- Mary Beth Peil as Evelyn "Grams" Ryan, Jen's grandmother. Her conservative personality initially puts her at odds with Jen, but she comes to form a close bond with her granddaughter and opens her home to Jack when he needs a place to stay.
- Nina Repeta as Bessie Potter (seasons 1–4; recurring seasons 5–6), Joey's older sister. She has helped raise Joey after the loss of their mother to cancer and their father to prison. She runs the Potter family-owned Icehouse restaurant and later opens up a bed-and-breakfast with Joey.
- Kerr Smith as Jack McPhee (seasons 3–6; recurring season 2), Andie's brother and Jen's best friend. As a high school student, he struggles with his sexuality and ultimately comes out as gay.
- Meredith Monroe as Andrea "Andie" McPhee (seasons 3–4; recurring season 2; guest season 6), Jack's sister who befriends and becomes involved with Pacey. Outwardly, she is an achiever at school but also struggles with mental illness which developed after the death of her older brother Tim.
- Busy Philipps as Audrey Liddell (season 6; recurring season 5), Joey's roommate at Worthington University. She becomes a part of the main characters' friendship group and has a brief relationship with Pacey.

== Production ==
=== Conception ===
Following the selling of his spec script for Wes Craven-directed Scream (1996), film assistant Kevin Williamson was taking several meetings with film and television producers before the slasher film began production. In what would be his first television meeting, Williamson met executive Paul Stupin; when asked if he had ideas for a television production, Williamson came up with the idea of a teen series based on his youth growing up near a North Carolina creek as an aspiring filmmaker who admired director Steven Spielberg.

Stupin liked his idea and asked him to come back the next day and pitch it to Columbia TriStar Television, prompting Williamson to write a 20-page outline for Dawson's Creek that night. Williamson pitched the show "as Some Kind of Wonderful, meets Pump Up the Volume, meets James at 15, meets My So-Called Life, meets Little House on the Prairie", also taking inspiration from teen drama Beverly Hills, 90210 as he "wanted it to speak to the teenage audience of the day".

When Columbia TriStar Television requested him to relocate the show to Boston, Massachusetts, he settled with fictional Capeside, and pitched it to Fox. However, commissioned amid the struggling of Party of Five, Fox wondered if they needed another teen drama, and while they were supportive of Williamson's scripts, they eventually passed on it. Left unused, Columbia TriStar Television sent his scripts to newly founded The WB network, which was looking for fresh programming ideas after launching the supernatural drama series Buffy the Vampire Slayer. Williamson went for a meeting with then-chief programmer Garth Ancier and entertainment president Susanne Daniels, who loved his script and picked it up for The WB's new Tuesday night lineup. Procter & Gamble Productions joined in as an original co-producer of the series, but sold its interest in the show three months before the premiere when printed stories surfaced about the racy dialogue and risqué plot lines.

=== Casting ===
Dawson's Creek would become responsible for launching the acting careers of its young lead stars James Van Der Beek, Michelle Williams, Katie Holmes, and Joshua Jackson, who had varying levels of acting experience prior to being cast in the show. Known for his appearance in The Mighty Ducks series, playing a young and aspiring hockey player, Jackson was initially considered for the main role of Dawson Leery. However, while Williamson "fell in love" with Jackson, citing his ability to read any role during the auditions, he felt that Jackson's good looks would not fit the underdog, nerd, and video geek character he envisioned for the show's titular character.

After The WB expressed their wish to look for a different actor, Williamson decided on casting him in the role of Dawson's best friend Pacey Witter instead. After watching a video of James Van Der Beek that his casting director had sent in, the casting crew invited him to audition in Los Angeles. A regular off-Broadway performer, Van Der Beek impressed Williamson with his "cerebral and internal" quality, citing "that nervousness that made it seem like he was pre-thinking and over-thinking and over-compensating constantly like he was insecure. And we said, "There's Dawson"." Actors Charlie Hunnam, Adrian Grenier, Jesse Tyler Ferguson, and Scott Speedman also auditioned for the role of Dawson, while Adam Brody read for Pacey. Josh Hartnett also auditioned for a role.

With the role of Dawson's best female friend Joey Potter, casting directors were looking for a tomboy character. Williamson and his team were initially close to casting actress Selma Blair in the role who had auditioned "very tough, [but] with a lot of heart," when an audition tape of Katie Holmes came in, in which she had filmed herself in her basement, with her mother reading Dawson's lines. Williamson thought she had exactly the right look for Joey, citing that "she had those eyes, those eyes just stained with loneliness." He asked her to come to California, but a conflict with her school play schedule prevented her from doing so. Upon her arrival in Los Angeles two weeks later, she was able to secure the role.

Michelle Williams, who had acted in Lassie, Species, and in guest spots on TV sitcoms, impressed Williamson when she auditioned with a heartfelt scene in which her character Jen Lindley goes in and sees her grandfather lying in the bed, transforming herself "into this broken child who just needed to be fixed". Katherine Heigl also was one of the actresses who auditioned for the role of Jen after Steve Miner, who directed the show's pilot and Heigl's 1994 film My Father the Hero, brought in the young star.

=== Production team ===
The entire first season, thirteen episodes, was filmed before the first episode even aired. After the end of the second season, Williamson left to focus on Wasteland, a new show for ABC, but later returned to write the two-hour series finale. After Williamson's departure, Alex Gansa was selected as the new showrunner, but a production shutdown in addition to actors' unhappiness with the story lines at the start of season three led to Gansa being replaced by Greg Berlanti, who had been on the writing staff before Williamson's departure. Members of the series' writing staff would go on to create or write for other notable TV shows, including Gina Fattore (Gilmore Girls), Jenny Bicks (Sex and the City), Julie Plec (The Vampire Diaries), Tom Kapinos (Californication), Mike White (The White Lotus), and Dana Baratta (Jessica Jones).

=== Filming locations ===
During its first four seasons, Dawson's Creek was primarily filmed in Wilmington, North Carolina, at EUE/Screen Gems studios and on location around Wilmington, with Southport and Wrightsville Beach also standing in for the fictional town of Capeside, a port city located in mid-Cape Cod. The Wilmington area benefited greatly from the show. While a number of films, commercials and music videos had been shot at the studios, Dawson's Creek was the first to occupy numerous soundstages for many years. Other shows as One Tree Hill later occupied some of these same soundstages for several years and used some of the same locations in Wilmington. In addition to business brought into the community by the project, it attracted attention to the city as a filming location and boosted tourism. The visitors' bureau distributed a special guide to filming locations used in the show.

For the Leery, Lindley, and Potter homes private residences located along the shores of Hewletts Creek, a stream in New Hanover County, were used. Some of the scenes shown during the opening credits and miscellaneous scenery shots throughout the early episodes were filmed in Martha's Vineyard, an island off the coast of Massachusetts, as well as Masonboro. Interiors for the Potter family's Icehouse restaurant were filmed at The Icehouse bar in downtown Wilmington, while exteriors were filmed at the Dockside Restaurant in Wrightsville Beach. Nearby constructions at the real Icehouse later forced producers to eliminate the bar from the storyline by burning it down. Other prominent exterior shots include Alderman and Hoggard Halls on the University of North Carolina Wilmington campus, serving for Capeside High School.

Due to the architectural uniformity of the campus, it was difficult for the university to double as another campus in the show when the characters reached college in the fifth and sixth season. Therefore, scenes at the fictional Worthington University in Boston were filmed at Duke University and around Franklin Street at the University of North Carolina at Chapel Hill. Other filming locations in later seasons include Durham and Raleigh. The Hell's Kitchen bar featured in the show was a natural food store at 118 Princess Street in Wilmington which was purchased by producers, dressed as a seedy college bar and used for production during the show's last season. When production completed, the building was purchased by a local restaurateur, along with much of the set and decorations and was then converted into a real restaurant and bar that retains the same name.

== Marketing ==
The WB spent an estimated $3 million on marketing the show several months ahead of the January 20, 1998, series premiere. Promotion included billboards in addition to trailers in theaters before screenings of films like Titanic, making The WB the first TV network to run trailers in movie theaters. A clip of the show was circulated to television critics and media outlets in the summer of 1997 which generated buzz for the show's risqué content that included frank sexual talk amongst teenagers and a romantic plot line between a teacher and a high school student.

J.Crew, which was the show's wardrobe provider, featured the then unknown cast for its winter-spring catalog. In January 1998, promos ran in Blockbuster video stores featuring the Paula Cole song "I Don't Want to Wait", which would later become the show's theme song after producers could not secure the rights for Alanis Morissette's "Hand in My Pocket". The WB's marketing campaign led Newsweek to remark Dawson's Creek is "as much a marketing event as a small-town serial about overheated hormones."

During the series' run, producers and writers were among the first to use cross-platform fan engagement through the series' official website, which was known as Dawson's Desktop. On the site, users could peruse "Dawson's multimedia journal and homework files, surf his bookmarked Web sites and listen to his CDs. They can read characters' e-mails and chats and go through their trash bins." According to show writer Jeffrey Stepakoff, "dawsonscreek.com [was] where fans could not only chat about the show, but tell us what they wanted to see next. The wishes of viewers had a very strong impact on the direction of the series. In fact, staff members were hired to interact regularly with fans online."

== Broadcast ==
=== International ===
The show was broadcast in over 50 countries. It was especially popular in Australia, where it rated #1 in its time slot on Network Ten for several episodes and highly at other times from seasons one to four. Reruns of the show are often seen in Australia on 9Go!

In the United Kingdom, Dawson's Creek initially aired on Channel 4 and S4C but later moved to Channel 5 for its final season. In 2007, Channel 5's sister channel 5Star began airing reruns on weekdays. From April 2011, it aired on Sony Channel on the Sky digital platform. In November 2017, the full series returned to Channel 4's streaming service All 4. In May 2023, ITV2 started airing every Dawson's Creek episode on every weekday afternoons.

In Finland, the show aired on Yle.

In Italy, Dawson's Creek initially aired on the pay TV channel TELE+ Bianco, but later moved to the free-to-air TV channel Italia 1 for its last four seasons.

The show aired in New Zealand on TVNZ 2.

In Norway the show aired on TV3, and ran from 1999 to 2004.

=== Syndication ===
Dawson's Creek aired on TBS from 2003 to 2008, and later aired on Noggin's late-night programming block The N from 2006 to 2007, and then later moved to the 24-hour version of The N where it aired until December 31, 2008. It aired on Pop from 2012 to 2018, and was telecast on ABC Family for a short time in 2015.

== Reception ==
=== Controversy ===
Dawson's Creek generated a large amount of publicity before its debut, with several television critics and consumer watchdog groups expressing concerns about its anticipated "racy" plots and dialogue. The controversy drove Procter & Gamble Productions, initially a co-producer of the series, away from the project. Syndicated columnist John Leo said the show should be called "While Parents Cringe", and went on to write, "The first episode contains a good deal of chatter about breasts, genitalia, masturbation, and penis size. Then the title and credits come on and the story begins."

The Parents Television Council (PTC) proclaimed the show as the single worst program of the 1997–98 and 1998–99 seasons by being "the crudest of the network shows aimed at kids", complaining about "an almost obsessive focus on pre-marital sexual activity", references to pornography and condoms, and the show's acceptance of homosexuality. Former UPN President Lucie Salhany criticized The WB for airing Dawson's Creek which features "adolescent characters in adult situations" in an early time slot while the network is supposed to be 'the family network.'" However, on the opposite end of the ideological spectrum, the National Organization for Women offered an endorsement, deeming it one of the least sexually exploitative shows on the air.

Much of the criticism cited the show's early decision to feature a storyline about a romantic relationship between a high school student and a teacher.

=== Critical response ===
Early reviews of the series were mixed to positive. During the season premiere, much was written about the show's perceived racy content and the teens' "unhealthy obsession with sex." Negative reviews lambasted the show for its lack of realism, particularly its verbose dialogue spoken by the teen characters which People said strained credibility. The Observer called the show "simply misguided and misconceived (hyper-articulate, self-conscious teenagers go through puberty in a Macy's catalogue)." Tom Shales of The Washington Post commented that creator Kevin Williamson was "the most overrated wunderkind in Hollywood" and "what he's brilliant at is pandering."

Other reviews noted the show tread familiar ground, with the LA Weekly writing, "[The show] comes alive in fits and starts, then folds back into a less original or less plausible or less coherent version of some part of something you've seen before, if you've seen The Wonder Years, My So-Called Life, Degrassi High, Party of Five, Dangerous Minds, or Beverly Hills, 90210. Or even one of those very special episodes of Blossom."

On the other hand, critics lauded the show's hyper-articulate, self-aware dialogue, saying it is what sets it apart from past teen shows. Caryn James of The New York Times wrote the "sophisticated awareness...characteristic of Mr. Williamson's writing" is the show's standout. Bruce Fretts of Entertainment Weekly wrote, "That's Kevin Williamson's genius — just as Scream did with slasher flicks, Creek simultaneously works as a teen soap (you can't help but get caught up in the Dawson-Jen-Joey triangle) and comments ironically on the genre (witness the digs at the overly earnest 90210 and Party of Five). The trouble is, some people aren't getting the joke."

Jeff Simon of The Buffalo News opined, "This is the way wildly bright 15-year-old kids dearly want to talk, which puts Dawson's Creek into a higher class of realism entirely." Williamson admitted he wrote the dialogue as such with the aim of showing "how teenagers would like to be seen, as opposed to being talked down to."

In response to concerns about the show's sexual dialogue, some critics wrote "it's safe to assume teens have said, heard, or done far worse." The Baltimore Sun wrote the show is "not so much about sex as it is about growing up in a sex-obsessed culture. It's a subtle difference, but one that could make this newest prime-time soap a cut above the rest." The Sacramento Bee noted the show does not appear to glorify teacher-student romances as "Pacey's great adventure is not seen by the others as a triumph, and in the end, both he and the teacher pay for [their liaison]."

John Carman of the San Francisco Chronicle found Dawson's Creek scenically "downright luxuriant" and liked that it "doesn't have the rushed feel of so many teen shows. The edginess is in the situations, not the pacing." Variety wrote that it was "an addictive drama with considerable heart", and that "it's a drama conceited enough to believe that it created the concept of teenagers who care and jaded enough to...[suggest] more than a post-pubescent pipe dream." The Atlanta Journal-Constitution acknowledged the sexual dialogue but said "Williamson conjures a strangely compelling blend of jadedness and innocence."

The St. Louis Post-Dispatch wrote the show "is a real charmer, capturing not only the awkwardness and agonies of growing up but also the pure joy of possibilities ahead", and The Seattle Times declared it the best show of the 1997–1998 season and said it "belongs in that too-small pantheon of My So-Called Life, James at 15 and to a lesser extent, Party of Five and Doogie Howser, M.D."

Praise for the cast was widespread. LA Weekly called the leads "luminous" and "talented", while Variety wrote, "As Dawson, Van Der Beek is an exquisitely talented heartthrob, and Holmes, as Joey, is a confident young performer who delivers her lines with slyness and conviction. Williams (Jen) and Jackson (Pacey), meanwhile, more than hold their own, with Jackson looking to be a budding star in his own right."

=== Awards and accolades ===
Dawson's Creek was nominated for fourteen awards, including ALMA Awards, Casting Society of America Awards, Golden Satellite Awards, TV Guide Awards, and YoungStar Awards. In 2000, the show was awarded a SHINE Award for consistently addressing sexual health issues on TV. By the end of its run, the show, its crew, and its young cast had been nominated for numerous awards, winning six of them. Joshua Jackson won the Teen Choice Award for Choice Actor three times, and the show won the Teen Choice Award for Choice Drama twice. The series also won the GLAAD Media Award for Outstanding TV Drama Series.

Year	Result	Award	Category	Recipients
2001	Nominated	ALMA Awards	Outstanding Director of a Drama Series	Gregory Prange
1998	Nominated	Artios Award	Best Casting for TV, Dramatic Pilot	Marcia Shulman
2000	Won	GLAAD Media Awards	Outstanding TV Drama Series	
2001	Nominated	GLAAD Media Awards	Outstanding TV Drama Series	
2004	Nominated	Satellite Awards	Best DVD Release of TV Shows	Dawson's Creek – The Complete Second Season
2000	Nominated	TV Guide Awards	Favorite Teen Show	
1999	Won	Teen Choice Awards	TV – Choice Drama	
1999	Won	Teen Choice Awards	TV – Choice Actor	Joshua Jackson
1999	Nominated	Teen Choice Awards	TV – Choice Actor	James Van Der Beek
1999	Nominated	Teen Choice Awards	TV – Choice Actress	Katie Holmes
1999	Nominated	Teen Choice Awards	TV – Breakout Performance	Rachael Leigh Cook
1999	Nominated	Teen Choice Awards	TV – Breakout Performance	Meredith Monroe
2000	Won	Teen Choice Awards	TV – Choice Drama	
2000	Won	Teen Choice Awards	TV – Choice Actor	Joshua Jackson
2000	Nominated	Teen Choice Awards	TV – Choice Actress	Katie Holmes
2001	Nominated	Teen Choice Awards	TV – Choice Drama	
2001	Won	Teen Choice Awards	TV – Choice Actor	Joshua Jackson
2001	Nominated	Teen Choice Awards	TV – Choice Actress	Katie Holmes
2002	Nominated	Teen Choice Awards	TV – Choice Drama/Action Adventure	
2002	Nominated	Teen Choice Awards	TV – Choice Actor, Drama	Joshua Jackson
2002	Nominated	Teen Choice Awards	TV – Choice Actress, Drama	Katie Holmes
2002	Nominated	Teen Choice Awards	TV – Choice Sidekick	Busy Philipps
2003	Nominated	Teen Choice Awards	TV – Choice Drama/Action Adventure	
2003	Nominated	Teen Choice Awards	TV – Choice Actor – Drama/Action Adventure	Joshua Jackson
2003	Nominated	Teen Choice Awards	TV – Choice Actress – Drama/Action Adventure	Katie Holmes
2003	Nominated	Teen Choice Awards	TV – Choice Sidekick	Mika Boorem
2018	Nominated	Teen Choice Awards	Choice Throwback TV Show	
1998	Nominated	YoungStar Awards	Outstanding TV Drama SeriesBest Performance by a Young Actress in a Drama TV Series	Michelle Williams
1999	Nominated	YoungStar Awards	Outstanding TV Drama SeriesBest Performance by a Young Actress in a Drama TV Series	Michelle Williams

=== U.S. television ratings ===
Season	Timeslot	Network	Number of episodes	Season premiere	Season finale	TV seasons	Rank	Viewers (in millions)
1	Tuesday 9/8c	The WB	13	January 20, 1998	May 19, 1998	1997–1998	#121	6.6
2	Wednesday 8/7c	The WB	22	October 7, 1998	May 26, 1999	1998–1999	#119	5.4
3	Wednesday 8/7c	The WB	23	September 29, 1999	May 24, 2000	1999–2000	#125	4.4
4	Wednesday 8/7c	The WB	23	October 4, 2000	May 23, 2001	2000–2001	#121	4.6
5	Wednesday 8/7c	The WB	23	October 10, 2001	May 15, 2002	2001–2002	#121	4.1
6	Wednesday 8/7c	The WB	24	October 2, 2002	May 14, 2003	2002–2003	#134	4.1

While never a huge ratings success in the context of major networks like NBC, ABC, and CBS, Dawson's Creek did very well with the younger demographic it targeted and became a defining show for the WB Network. It became the highest-rated show among female teens at that time and helped ad revenue for the WB "soar from $100 million in 1996 to well over half a billion dollars in 1999." The pilot episode was watched by 6.8 million viewers and had a 4.8 rating which made it the network's highest ranked show within two months.

The first season's highest ranked episode was the finale, which was fifty-ninth, while the second highest rated was the second episode (probably scoring so well partially because the other major networks carried President Clinton's State of the Union address in the midst of the Lewinsky scandal rather than their regular programming). The series finale itself was watched by 7.3 million U.S. viewers, which was its largest audience since Season 2.

== Spin-offs ==
The show had, in the words of television experts Tim Brooks and Earle Marsh, a "semi-spinoff" – Young Americans. The protagonist of Young Americans, Will Krudski (Rodney Scott), was introduced in three episodes at the end of the show's third season as a friend of Dawson, Joey, and Pacey's who had previously moved away and returned to Capeside for a visit. His character was never referred to before this story arc and did not appear again in the series after the season three episode "Show Me Love".

Young Americans was made by the same company as Dawson's Creek, Columbia TriStar Television, and appeared in Dawson's Creek's time slot during the show's break in the summer of 2000. Young Americans had 8 episodes. The reason the show is considered a semi-spinoff instead of a true spinoff is that the character of Will was not originally created for Dawson's Creek, and was only introduced in Dawson's to set up and establish the premise of Young Americans.

=== Foreign remakes ===
The show served as inspiration for the production of the Argentine soap Verano del '98, which received criticism for being a thinly veiled copy of Dawson's Creek. The 2007 youth drama series Kavak Yelleri is a Turkish remake of the show.

== Merchandise ==
=== Music ===
Curating popular music and breaking artists from the independent and alternative rock genres, Dawson's Creek became impactful on shaping the television music culture of teen and other drama series in the late 1990s and early 2000s. Instrumentation of the episodes was generally overseen by executive Paul Stupin, music supervisor John McCullough, and co-producer Drew Matich who helped artists rise to fame and made pivotal creative decisions. The trio approached music in "a way to convey the emotion, to convey the story," looking for songs to underplay whole sequences where viewers could also enjoy the music under dialogue. Thus, Stupin would often end up spending hours in the editing room with the editor going over candidates for songs that McCullough sent over. In some cases, they would look at ten or 15 songs against each scene. Next to McCullough, recommendations for inclusion came "from everywhere", with writers, editors, co-producers and Sony Music executives playing pivotal roles.

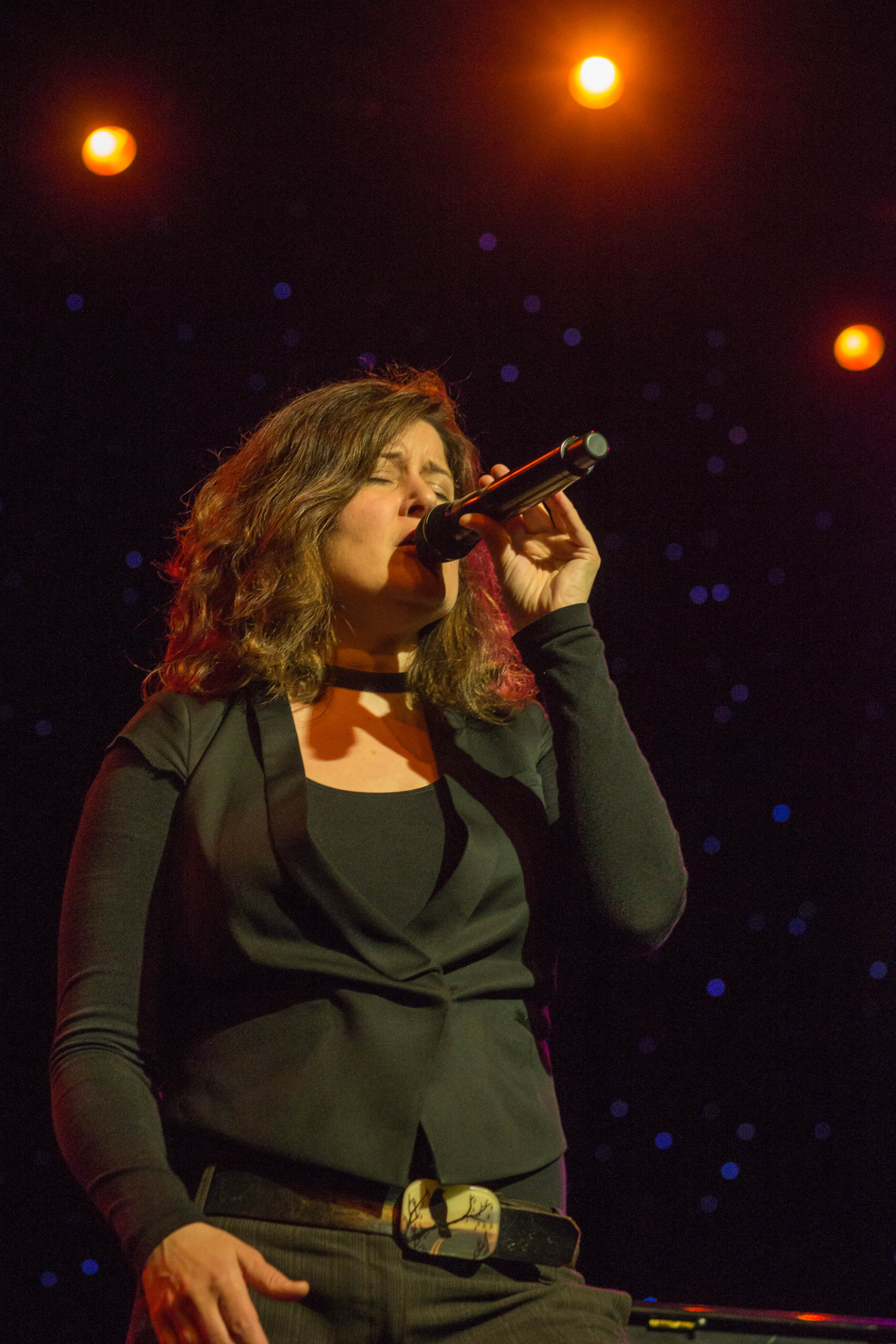
Paula Cole's "I Don't Want to Wait" served as the show's theme song.

Originally, Canadian recording artist Alanis Morissette's song "Hand in My Pocket" from her third studio album Jagged Little Pill (1995) served as the theme song in the unaired pilot episode of the television show. Morissette decided not to have it used as the theme after Dawson's Creek was picked up, prompting Stupin and McCullough to approach different artists for original material to use. In the meantime, The WB had licensed American singer-songwriter Paula Cole's song "I Don't Want to Wait" from her second album This Fire (1996) and suggested them to use it instead. An eleventh hour decision, it was incorporated late into the promotion of the series but became a hit on the US Billboard charts upon the show's debut in January 1998. The first season's score was provided by Adam Fields, including the "End Credits Theme", which was used on all six seasons.

Because Sony Music failed to secure the rights for home video and online streaming services when the show was produced and did not wish to pay for them later, most of the songs that aired in the original broadcasts were replaced in the DVD editions and upon the video-on-demand debut of the show. Starting with the third season, "I Don't Want to Wait" was also dropped from the opening sequence of the DVD releases due to budget reasons and was replaced by "Run Like Mad" from Canadian folk artist Jann Arden, a regular music contributor to the series.

The 32-second recording was one of the original intros that Stupin commissioned after he had failed to acquire rights to Morissette's song and which international broadcasts had previously used as the theme song for the first season before switching to Cole's song for the remainder of the run. In 2021, Cole recorded a new version of "I Don't Want to Wait" to avoid licensing issues with the original master, and Netflix used this new master as the theme song.

During its original run, Dawson's Creek spawned two volumes of soundtrack albums. The album Songs from Dawson's Creek was released after the broadcasting of the series' first season in April 1999, and became a major success worldwide. It reached the top of the Australian Albums Chart and also peaked within the top in Austria, Norway, Sweden, and the United States. During it first sixth months of release, the album sold more than 1.5 million copies worldwide and was certified triple platinum by the Australian Recording Industry Association (ARIA) and gold by the Recording Industry Association of America (RIAA). In Australia, it became the fifth highest selling album of 1999. Songs from Dawson's Creek – Volume 2 was released in October 2000 to coincide with the debut of the series' fourth season. Less successful, it reached the top twenty of Austrian and Swiss Albums Charts, while peaking at number 50 on the US Billboard 200.

=== Book series ===
Simon & Schuster published a series of fifteen mass-market paperback novelizations of the series. Before joining the series' staff as episode writers, Liz Tigelaar and Anna Fricke wrote a young adult suspense-themed series as a companion to the show.

== Legacy ==
The show's influence as a cultural touchstone has been widely acknowledged by media outlets and critics. In an article for BuzzFeed News, Sandi Rankaduwa wrote about why the show resonated with young people who came of age during the era of Columbine and 9/11, saying "At a time in teens' lives when they're tasked with trying to understand their place in the world, events unfolding around them were becoming increasingly senseless. So it's not entirely surprising that a show featuring confused, outsider teens who seemed more self-aware than the adults around them became comfort food for so many young Americans...but despite its nostalgic elements, Dawson's Creek managed to portray a warts-and-all world in which viewers watched smart, stubborn, and emotional characters search for stability, and seeing them both struggle and succeed in a controlled space became therapeutic. The breadth of characters was wide enough to give everyone at least one person to root for and relate to, especially for a primarily teen girl audience."

Rankaduwa added, "Unlike the glamorous lifestyles shown in shows like Beverly Hills, 90210 and later The O.C., both on Fox, the stories of teens on the Creek felt somewhat accessible. And when it came to what made Dawson's Creek so significant to its teen viewers, it wasn't just the words, it was who was saying them."

Entertainment Weekly ranked Pacey and Joey as number 20 on their list of the 100 Best TV Romances of All Time. The season three finale episode "True Love" is ranked at number 50 on The Ringer's list of 100 Best TV Episodes of the Century. The character of Jack McPhee was cited as being among the most groundbreaking gay roles on television and his kiss with Ethan marked the first romantic kiss between two gay male characters on primetime TV.

The popularity and success of Dawson's Creek is credited with paving the way for subsequent teen shows. In 2018, Kristen Baldwin of EW argued, "Without Dawson's (and its original lead-out, Buffy the Vampire Slayer), we would never have the hyper-verbal, pop culture-obsessed teens of Riverdale— not to mention Felicity and Charmed (1998), Popular, Freaks and Geeks (which was actually pitched as "the anti-Dawson's Creek") and Roswell (1999), Gilmore Girls (2000), Everwood (2002), or 2003's One Tree Hill and The O.C. After all, who is Seth Cohen but a snarkier, more Jewish Dawson Leery?"

Baldwin continued, "with Dawson's the characters didn't just suffer through crushes and hormones and parental drama — they talked endlessly, and with hilarious eloquence, about how cliché their crushes and hormones and parental drama was. As EW's Chris Nashawaty wrote in 1997, on the eve of Dawson's premiere, 'Williamson shows teens a reflection of how they want to be seen: witty, urbane, and always armed with a perfectly barbed, sarcastic comeback.'"

In 2018, the cast reunited for the series' 20th anniversary in a special issue of Entertainment Weekly, which included five different collectible covers for its print issue. The weekend following the reunion cover saw streaming traffic for the series on Hulu quadruple.

When asked about the possibility of a reboot, Katie Holmes said, "What I love about the show is that it existed at a time pre-social media, pre-internet, and it was nostalgic when we were shooting it. So I really like it where it is, to be honest." Kevin Williamson added, "Dawson's Creek was me expressing myself at that point in time. And here I am, at another age, at another point in time. I don't know what I could emotionally bring to the table. I can't wait for someone else to do it. I don't think it's going to be me. But I'll be happy to watch it."

== In popular culture ==
Dawson's Creek was frequently referenced in other media, including South Park at the height of its popularity. The children's sketch comedy series The Amanda Show included a recurring soap opera parody segment called "Moody's Point". The late-night comedy show Mad TV parodied Dawson's Creek in their "Pretty White Kids with Problems" sketch. The series was also parodied at the 1998 MTV Movie Awards and in the 2000 film Scary Movie, the latter in which Van Der Beek makes a cameo. Van Der Beek, playing a fictionalized version of himself in Don't Trust the B— in Apartment 23, frequently made fun of his character in the show.

Van Der Beek appeared alongside Jason Biggs in the 2001 film Jay and Silent Bob Strike Back as the cinematic versions of the titular characters Jay and Silent Bob's alter-egos "Bluntman & Chronic". During an argument, Biggs confuses Van Der Beek's character of Dawson with that of Joshua Jackson's character Pacey.

The scene of Dawson's crying face became a meme that Van Der Beek acknowledged.

Thea Glassman includes Dawson's Creek as a revolutionary teen show in her 2023 book Freaks, Gleeks, and Dawson's Creek: How 7 Shows Transformed Television.
