= Kevin Williamson (screenwriter) =

American screenwriter, director, and producer (born 1965)

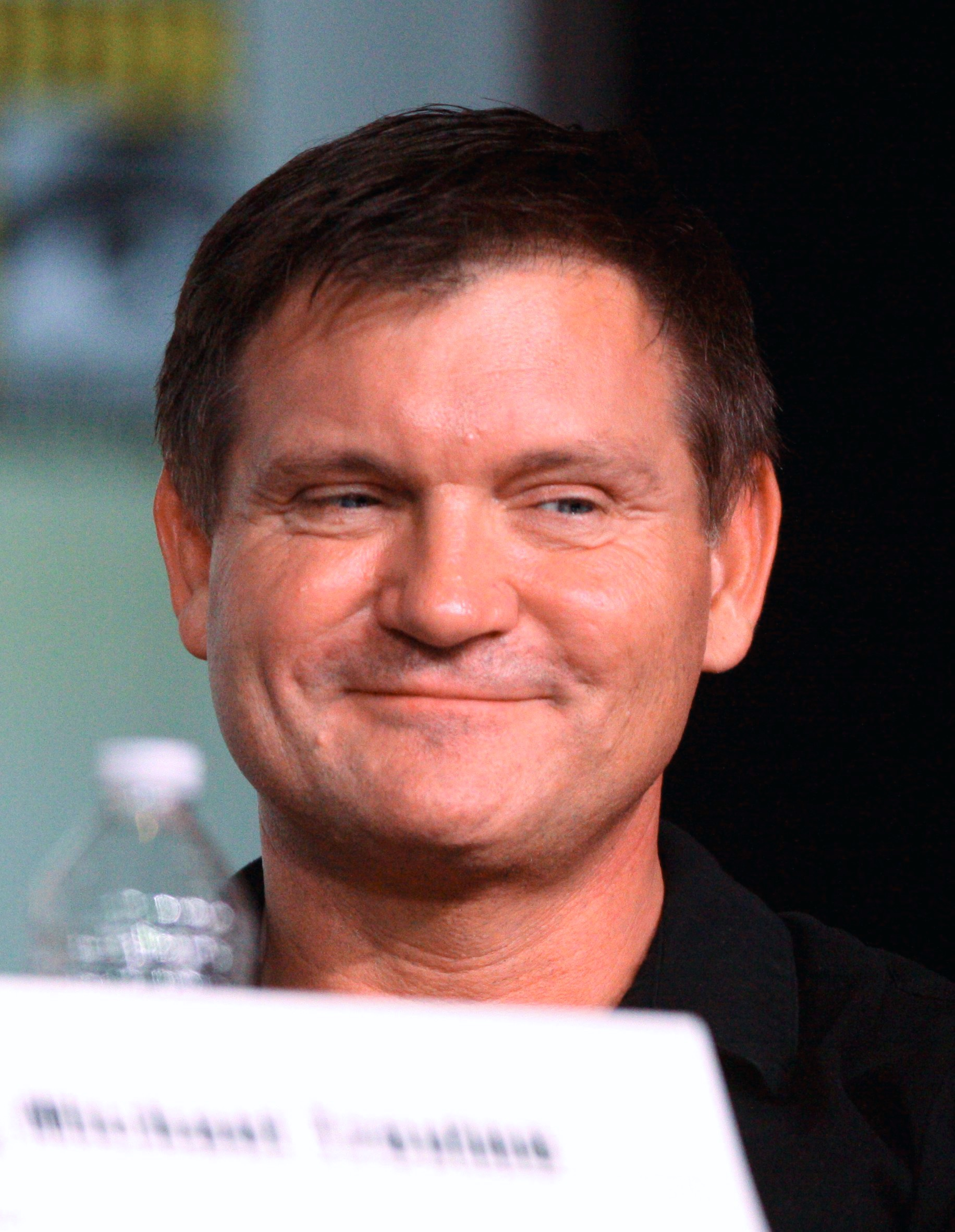
- Williamson in 2012
- Born: Kevin Meade Williamson; March 14, 1965 (age 61); New Bern, North Carolina, U.S.
- Occupations: Screenwriter; director; producer
- Writing career
- Years active: 1990–present
- Notable works: Scream; I Know What You Did Last Summer; Dawson's Creek; The Faculty; Teaching Mrs. Tingle; The Following; The Vampire Diaries; Tell Me a Story

Kevin Meade Williamson (born March 14, 1965) is an American screenwriter and filmmaker. He is known for writing the screenplay for the slasher film Scream (1996)—which launched the Scream franchise—along with those for Scream 2 (1997) and Scream 4 (2011), and writing and directing Scream 7 (2026). He is also known for creating the WB teen drama series Dawson's Creek (1998–2003), the CW supernatural drama series The Vampire Diaries (2009–2017), the Fox crime thriller series The Following (2013–2015) and the CBS All Access thriller series Tell Me a Story (2018–2020).

Williamson also wrote the screenplays for the films I Know What You Did Last Summer (1997), The Faculty (1998), Cursed (2005), and Sick (2022). He made his directorial debut with the black comedy film Teaching Mrs. Tingle (1999).

== Early life ==
Williamson was born in New Bern, North Carolina, the younger son of Faye and Ottis Wade Williamson, a fisherman who turned to drug trafficking on his sea trolley and served time in prison. He spent his early years in Aransas Pass, Texas, near Corpus Christi. Williamson's family returned to North Carolina for his high school years. He then attended East Carolina University in Greenville, North Carolina, where he earned a BFA in Theatre Arts.

He told Entertainment Weekly interviewer Melissa Maerz, "When I was growing up, my mom and dad took me to the Poe Museum in Richmond, Virginia. It was a little house downtown, and "The Raven" was written on the walls. You had to move from room to room to read the whole story. I thought it was the coolest thing in the world."

== Career ==
=== Early career (1990–1994) ===
After graduation, he moved to New York City to pursue an acting career. Though he landed a part on the soap opera Another World in 1990, he moved to Los Angeles the following year, where he had small parts on the TV series In Living Color, in the films Dirty Money and Hot Ticket, and in music videos. While taking classes on screenwriting at UCLA he wrote his first script, Killing Mrs. Tingle (later retitled Teaching Mrs. Tingle) which was bought by a production company in 1995 and put on the shelf.

=== Mainstream breakthrough (1995–1998) ===
==== Scream ====
Inspired by the March 23, 1994, episode of the news magazine Turning Point on Danny Rolling, a serial killer in Gainesville, Florida, who preyed on college students, Williamson wrote a horror movie script, originally titled Scary Movie. Its characters had seen many classic horror movies (e.g. Halloween, A Nightmare on Elm Street) and knew all the clichés. Miramax bought the script for $400,000 for their new Dimension Films label in the spring of 1995. Directed by Wes Craven, the film was renamed Scream, and released in the United States on December 20, 1996. It became a commercial blockbuster and critical success—ultimately drawing $173 million in ticket sales worldwide.

Kevin Williamson earned the Saturn Award for Best Writing in 1996 for his work on Scream.

In 1997, Dimension Films released Scream 2, also written by Williamson. It, too, was a critical and box office hit and paved the way for five more installments: Scream 3 (2000), Scream 4 (2011), Scream 5 (2022), Scream 6 (2023), and Scream 7 (2026). Williamson wrote Scream 4 and wrote and directed Scream 7.

==== Dawson's Creek ====
Paul Stupin, an executive at Columbia TriStar Television, read Scream after the bidding war for the script and was convinced Williamson was just the man to create a television series for his company. The result was Dawson's Creek, a semi-autobiographical tale set in a small coastal community not unlike Oriental. Williamson was the model for the title character, Dawson Leery, a hopeless romantic who is obsessed with movies—especially those of Steven Spielberg. Joey Potter, the platonic girl-next-door, was based on a real life friend of Williamson's when he was young.

In December 1995, the show was pitched to the Fox Network, where Stupin had been an executive, but it was rejected. Then in 1996, Stupin and Williamson went to, and struck a deal with, The WB. Williamson said, "I pitched it as Some Kind of Wonderful, meets Pump Up the Volume, meets James at 15, meets My So-Called Life, meets Little House on the Prairie." Dawson's Creek premiered on The WB on January 20, 1998, and was an immediate hit that helped launch the newly created television network.

In 1999, Williamson left the show to focus on other endeavors, among them ABC's Wasteland, which failed to attract a sizable audience and was canceled after its thirteen-episode first season. He later returned to Dawson's Creek to write the two-part series finale in 2003.

==== I Know What You Did Last Summer ====
In 1997, Williamson wrote his next film, I Know What You Did Last Summer, based on a 1973 novel of the same name by Lois Duncan. Centered on four high school friends who accidentally run over a man and dump his body in an attempt to go on with their lives, the plot focuses on the four friends a year after the accident when they become the victims of a serial stalker. Despite receiving negative reviews from critics, the film helped launch the careers of actors Jennifer Love Hewitt, Freddie Prinze, Jr., Sarah Michelle Gellar, and Ryan Phillippe, going on to spawn three sequels, none of which Williamson was involved with.

=== Later work (1999–2008) ===
Williamson gave up the job of writing the full script for Scream 3 in order to direct his first script, originally titled Killing Mrs. Tingle, a comedy thriller, inspired by an event he experienced in high school. Teaching Mrs. Tingle (as it was renamed after the Columbine High School massacre) followed a group of students getting even with their vindictive teacher.

In 1999, Williamson created Wasteland, a late-night, sexualized version of his earlier show, Dawson's Creek. It aired for just 3 episodes in October 1999 before being canceled. The remaining 10 episodes were aired on Showtime's ShowNext channel in 2001.

In 2001, Williamson created Glory Days as a mid-season replacement for The WB. The series followed a novelist returning to his hometown, a coastal community within Washington state, which was experiencing strange occurrences—seeming to mirror the plot ABC's Twin Peaks. Debuting in January 2002, the series was canceled after the airing of nine episodes.

Williamson wrote another script which Wes Craven would go on to direct called Cursed, after a failed first shoot starring an almost entirely different cast before re-writes and re-shoots turned the project into something new, it was finally released in 2005. Due to the many script changes, delays in production and low promotional budget due to all the re-shoots, the film failed to perform at the box office.

Later that same year, Dimension Films released Williamson's horror film Venom, about a group of teens stalked by a crazed killer in the bayous of Louisiana. Williamson is listed as a producer of the film but not as a writer. The film opened to negative reviews and suffered at the box office, taking in less than $900,000 in gross revenue.

In 2006, Williamson began production on a new teen drama, tentatively titled Palm Springs, for The CW, the successor to the WB network. Later retitled Hidden Palms, the series was a coming-of-age drama about a troubled teen who moves with his mother and new stepfather to a gated community in Palm Springs, California, where he uncovers dark secrets about his neighbors and his home's previous tenants. Hidden Palms was originally intended to be a midseason replacement set to air in March but its timeslot was filled by Pussycat Dolls Present: The Search for the Next Doll instead. The pilot eventually premiered on May 30, 2007, to favorable reviews. However, after eight episodes, the series was canceled due to low viewership ratings. The final episode aired on July 4, 2007.

=== Return and newfound success (2009–present) ===
Williamson developed a new TV series for The CW entitled The Vampire Diaries, which was adapted from a novel series of the same name by L. J. Smith. The series follows the life of Elena Gilbert (Nina Dobrev), who falls in love with vampire Stefan Salvatore (Paul Wesley), and soon finds herself caught in a love triangle between Stefan and his older brother, Damon (Ian Somerhalder), while the brothers are also being haunted by the past they've had with Katherine Pierce (also played by Dobrev). The series also focuses on the lives of Elena's friends and other inhabitants of the fictional town of Mystic Falls, Virginia. The Vampire Diaries premiered on September 10, 2009, and has become a domestic and international hit.

Williamson developed a new TV series for The CW entitled The Secret Circle, which was from another book series of Vampire Diaries writer, L. J. Smith. The series revolves around six teenage witches who form a Circle coven on the fictional town of Chance Harbor, Washington.

The Secret Circle premiered on September 15, 2011, just after the third-season premiere of The Vampire Diaries. It was pickup for a full-season on October 12, 2011. It was eventually cancelled.

Williamson was the writer and producer for Scream 4, which began shooting in June 2010 and was released in theaters on April 15, 2011.

Williamson created the TV series The Following, which began airing on Fox in the 2012–13 television season. Starring critically acclaimed actor Kevin Bacon, the series follows an ex-FBI agent who finds himself in the middle of a network of serial killers. The series was cancelled by Fox on May 8, 2015, however it was reported the series was being shopped to Hulu for a possible fourth season.

Williamson also created Stalker, a psychological thriller centered on a pair of detectives who handle stalking incidents for the Threat Management Unit of the LAPD. The pilot was directed by Liz Friedlander and starred Dylan McDermott and Maggie Q. The series was cancelled on May 11, 2015, after one season. It was reported Warner Bros. would possibly shop the series around.

In 2017, Williamson developed Time After Time, based on the novel of the same name, with the plot reset in 2017 New York City. It failed to capture a large enough audience for ABC.

In 2018, Williamson created Tell Me a Story, a psychological thriller based on the Mexican television series Érase una vez, who takes "the world's most beloved fairy tales and reimagines them as a dark and twisted psychological thriller". The pilot was also directed by Friedlander (who also directed episodes of The Vampire Diaries, The Following and Stalker for Williamson) and starred James Wolk, Billy Magnussen, Dania Ramirez, Kim Cattrall, Danielle Campbell and Paul Wesley. The latter was one of the main actors in Williamson's previous show, The Vampire Diaires. The show began airing on CBS All Access on October 31, 2018.

In March 2020, it was announced that Williamson would serve as executive producer for the fifth installment of the Scream franchise, which was directed by Tyler Gillett and Matt Bettinelli-Olpin. The film was released on January 14, 2022.

In January 2022, it was announced that Williamson would reunite with Julie Plec for an adaptation of the comic Dead Day for Peacock. In January 2023, it was announced Peacock was no longer moving forward with Dead Day but that the potential series was being shopped to other networks.

In February 2022, it was announced that a sequel to Scream (2022) had been greenlit, with a planned release date of March 31, 2023, with Williamson on board as an executive producer.

In June 2022, Julie Plec, who co-created The Vampire Diaries with Williamson, announced that she, Williamson, and another TVDU executive producer, Brett Matthews, were working on a fourth show in the universe together.

In March 2024, Williamson was confirmed to be returning to the Scream franchise as the director of Scream 7.

== Personal life ==
Williamson is gay. He came out to his friends and family in 1992.

== Filmography ==
=== Film ===
Key
†	Denotes films that have not yet been released

Kevin Williamson film credits
Year	Title	Writer	Producer	Director	Refs
1996	Scream	Yes	No	No	
1997	I Know What You Did Last Summer	Yes	No	No	
1997	Scream 2	Yes	Executive	No	
1998	Halloween H20: 20 Years Later	Uncredited	Executive	No	
1998	The Faculty	Yes	No	No	
1999	Teaching Mrs. Tingle	Yes	No	Yes	
2000	Scream 3	No	Yes	No	
2005	Cursed	Yes	Yes	No	
2005	Venom	No	Yes	No	
2011	Scream 4	Yes	Yes	No	
2022	Scream	No	Executive	No	
2022	Sick	Yes	Yes	No	
2023	Scream VI	No	Executive	No	
2024	The Exorcism	No	Yes	No	
2026	Scream 7	Yes	Executive	Yes	

=== Television ===
Kevin Williamson television credits
Year	Title	Writer	Creator	Executive producer	Notes
1998–2003	Dawson's Creek	Yes	Yes	Yes	
1999	Wasteland	Yes	Yes	Yes	
2002	Glory Days	Yes	Yes	Yes	
2007	Hidden Palms	Yes	Yes	Yes	
2009–2017	The Vampire Diaries	Yes	Yes	Yes	
2011–2012	The Secret Circle	Yes	No	Yes	
2013–2015	The Following	Yes	Yes	Yes	
2014–2015	Stalker	Yes	Yes	Yes	
2015	Scream	Story	No	No	Episode: "Pilot"
2017	Time After Time	Yes	Yes	Yes	
2018–2020	Tell Me a Story	Yes	Yes	Yes	
2025	The Waterfront	Yes	Yes	Yes	
