= List of American films of 2010 =

This is a list of American films released in 2010.

== Box office ==
The highest-grossing American films released in 2010, by domestic box office gross revenue, are as follows:

Highest-grossing films of 2010
Rank	Title	Distributor	Domestic gross
1	Toy Story 3	Disney	$415,004,880
2	Alice in Wonderland	Disney	$334,191,110
3	Iron Man 2	Paramount	$312,433,331
4	The Twilight Saga: Eclipse	Summit	$300,531,751
5	Harry Potter and the Deathly Hallows – Part 1	Warner Bros.	$295,983,305
6	Inception	Warner Bros.	$292,576,195
7	Despicable Me	Universal	$251,513,985
8	Shrek Forever After	Paramount	$238,736,787
9	How to Train Your Dragon	Paramount	$217,581,231
10	Tangled	Disney	$200,821,936

== January–March ==
Opening		Title	Production company	Cast and crew	Ref.
J A N U A R Y	6	Garbage Dreams	Wynne Films	Mai Iskander (director)	
J A N U A R Y	6	Sweetgrass	The Cinema Guild	Lucien Castaing-Taylor & Ilisa Barbash (directors)	
J A N U A R Y	8	Daybreakers	Lionsgate	Peter Spierig & Michael Spierig (directors/screenplay); Ethan Hawke, Willem Dafoe, Sam Neill, Claudia Karvan, Michael Dorman, Isabel Lucas, Vince Colosimo, Jay Laga'aia	
J A N U A R Y	8	Leap Year	Universal Pictures / Spyglass Entertainment	Anand Tucker (director); Harry Elfont, Deborah Kaplan (screenplay); Amy Adams, Matthew Goode, Adam Scott, John Lithgow, Kaitlin Olson, Noel O'Donovan, Tony Rohr, Pat Laffan, Alan Devlin, Ian McElhinney, Vincenzo Nicoli, Flaminia Cinque, Peter O'Meara	
J A N U A R Y	8	Youth in Revolt	The Weinstein Company	Miguel Arteta (director); Gustin Nash (screenplay); Michael Cera, Portia Doubleday, Justin Long, Steve Buscemi, Ray Liotta, Jean Smart, Zach Galifianakis, Erik Knudsen, Adhir Kalyan, Fred Willard, Ari Graynor, Rooney Mara, Jade Fusco, M. Emmet Walsh, Mary Kay Place, Jonathan Bradford Wright, Michael Collins	
J A N U A R Y	8	Bitch Slap	IM Global / Summit Entertainment	Rick Jacobson (director/screenplay); Eric Gruendemann (screenplay); Julia Voth, Erin Cummings, America Olivo, Ron Melendez, William Gregory Lee, Minae Noji, Michael Hurst	
J A N U A R Y	8	Crazy on the Outside	Freestyle Releasing	Tim Allen (director); Judd Pillot, John Peaslee (screenplay); Tim Allen, Sigourney Weaver, Ray Liotta, J.K. Simmons, Julie Bowen, Kelsey Grammer, Jeanne Tripplehorn, Kenton Duty, Daniel Booko, Karle Warren, Robert Baker, Casey Sander, Jon Gries, Malcolm Goodwin, Rocky LaPorte, Meeghan Holaway	
J A N U A R Y	8	Waiting for Armageddon	First Run Features	Kate Davis, David Heilbroner (directors)	
J A N U A R Y	8	Wonderful World	Magnolia Pictures	Joshua Goldin (director); Matthew Broderick, Sanaa Lathan, Michael K. Williams, Jodelle Ferland, Jesse Tyler Ferguson, Ally Walker, Philip Baker Hall	
J A N U A R Y	15	The Book of Eli	Warner Bros. Pictures / Alcon Entertainment / Silver Pictures	Allen Hughes, Albert Hughes (directors); Gary Whitta, Anthony Peckham (screenplay); Denzel Washington, Gary Oldman, Mila Kunis, Ray Stevenson, Jennifer Beals, Evan Jones, Joe Pingue, Frances de la Tour, Michael Gambon, Tom Waits, Chris Browning, Malcolm McDowell	
J A N U A R Y	15	The Spy Next Door	Lionsgate / Relativity Media	Brian Levant (director); Jonathan Bernstein, James Greer, Gregory Poirier (screenplay); Jackie Chan, Amber Valletta, Magnús Scheving, Billy Ray Cyrus, George Lopez, Lucas Till, Katherine Boecher, Madeline Carroll, Alina Foley, Will Shadley, Jeff Chase, Esodie Geiger	
J A N U A R Y	20	House of Numbers: Anatomy of an Epidemic	Knowledge Matters Productions	Brent Leung (director)	
J A N U A R Y	22	Extraordinary Measures	CBS Films	Tom Vaughan (director); Robert Nelson Jacobs (screenplay); Brendan Fraser, Harrison Ford, Keri Russell, Courtney B. Vance, Meredith Droeger, Diego Velazquez, Sam M. Hall, Patrick Bauchau, Jared Harris, Alan Ruck, David Clennon, Dee Wallace, Ayanna Berkshire, P.J. Byrne, Andrea White, G.J. Echternkamp, Vu Pham, Derek Webster, John Crowley	
J A N U A R Y	22	Legion	Screen Gems / Bold Films	Scott Stewart (director/screenplay); Peter Schink (screenplay); Paul Bettany, Lucas Black, Tyrese Gibson, Adrianne Palicki, Charles S. Dutton, Jon Tenney, Kevin Durand, Willa Holland, Kate Walsh, Dennis Quaid, Jeanette Miller, Doug Jones, Josh Stamberg, Yancey Arias	
J A N U A R Y	22	Tooth Fairy	20th Century Fox / Walden Media	Michael Lembeck (director); Lowell Ganz, Babaloo Mandel, Joshua Sternin, Jeffrey Ventimilia, Randi Mayem Singer (screenplay); Dwayne Johnson, Ashley Judd, Julie Andrews, Stephen Merchant, Chase Ellison, Ryan Sheckler, Brendan Meyer, Seth MacFarlane, Brandon T. Jackson, Ellie Harvie, Barclay Hope, Michael Daingerfield, Alvin Sanders, Peter Kelamis, Billy Crystal, Destiny Whitlock, Josh Emerson	
J A N U A R Y	22	Soundtrack for a Revolution	Louverture Films	John Legend, Wyclef Jean, The Roots, Joss Stone, Blind Boys of Alabama, Mary Mary, Richie Havens, and Anthony Hamilton	
J A N U A R Y	22	To Save a Life	Samuel Goldwyn Films	Brian Baugh (director); Randy Wayne, Deja Kreutzberg, Joshua Weigel, Steven Crowder, D. David Morin	
J A N U A R Y	26	Bad Biology	Media Blasters	Frank Henenlotter (director/screenplay); R.A. The Rugged Man (screenplay); Charlee Danielson, Anthony Sneed, J-Zone, Remedy, Reef the Lost Cauze, Vinnie Paz, James Glickenhaus	
J A N U A R Y	29	Edge of Darkness	Warner Bros. Pictures / GK Films / BBC Films	Martin Campbell (director); William Monahan, Andrew Bovell (screenplay); Mel Gibson, Ray Winstone, Danny Huston, Bojana Novakovic, Shawn Roberts, David Aaron Baker, Jay O. Sanders, Denis O'Hare, Damian Young, Caterina Scorsone, Frank Grillo, Gbenga Akinnagbe, Paul Sparks, Frank L. Ridley	
J A N U A R Y	29	When in Rome	Touchstone Pictures	Mark Steven Johnson (director); David Diamond, David Weissman (screenplay); Kristen Bell, Josh Duhamel, Will Arnett, Jon Heder, Dax Shepard, Danny DeVito, Anjelica Huston, Alexis Dziena, Kate Micucci, Peggy Lipton, Luca Calvani, Keir O'Donnell, Bobby Moynihan, Kristen Schaal, Judith Malina, Lee Pace, Natalie Joy Johnson, Charlie Sanders, Eugene Cordero, Alexa Havins, Geoffrey Cantor, Francesco De Vito, Shaquille O'Neal, Lawrence Taylor, David Lee, Brian Kenny, Ghostface Killah, Don Johnson, Efren Ramirez	
J A N U A R Y	29	Preacher's Kid	Gener8Xion Entertainment	Stan Foster (director); LeToya Luckett, Rae'Ven Larrymore Kelly, Kierra Sheard, Durrell Babbs, Clifton Powell, Gregory Alan Williams	
J A N U A R Y	29	Saint John of Las Vegas	IndieVest Pictures / Circle of Confusion	Hue Rhodes (director/screenplay); Steve Buscemi, Romany Malco, Peter Dinklage, Emmanuelle Chriqui, Tim Blake Nelson, Sarah Silverman, John Cho, Danny Trejo, Aviva, Jesse Garcia, Isaac Kappy	
F E B R U A R Y	5	Dear John	Screen Gems / Relativity Media	Lasse Hallström (director); Jamie Linden (screenplay); Channing Tatum, Amanda Seyfried, Richard Jenkins, Henry Thomas, D.J. Cotrona, Cullen Moss, Gavin McCulley, Jose Lucena, Keith Robinson, Scott Porter, David Andrews, Luke Benward, Brett Rice	
F E B R U A R Y	5	From Paris With Love	Lionsgate	Pierre Morel (director); Adi Hasak (screenplay); John Travolta, Jonathan Rhys Meyers, Kasia Smutniak, David Gasman, Richard Durden, Amber Rose Revah, Eric Godon, Chems Eddine Dahmani, Alexandra Boyd, Nick Loren, Melissa Mars, Frederic Chau, John Kiriakou, Luc Besson, Kelly Preston	
F E B R U A R Y	5	Frozen	Anchor Bay Entertainment	Adam Green (director/screenplay); Emma Bell, Shawn Ashmore, Kevin Zegers, Rileah Vanderbilt, Ed Ackerman, Adam Johnson, Christopher York, Kane Hodder, Will Barratt, Adam Green, Joe Lynch, Cody Blue Snider	
F E B R U A R Y	6	Temple Grandin	HBO Films	Mick Jackson (director); Christopher Monger, William Merritt Johnson (screenplay); Claire Danes, Catherine O'Hara, Julia Ormond, David Strathairn, Charles Baker, Barry Tubb, Stephanie Faracy, Melissa Farman, Rutherford Cravens, Cyndi Williams, Cherami Leigh, Gabriel Luna	
F E B R U A R Y	12	Percy Jackson & the Olympians: The Lightning Thief	20th Century Fox / Fox 2000 Pictures / Dune Entertainment / 1492 Pictures	Chris Columbus (director); Craig Titley (screenplay); Logan Lerman, Brandon T. Jackson, Alexandra Daddario, Jake Abel, Sean Bean, Pierce Brosnan, Steve Coogan, Rosario Dawson, Melina Kanakaredes, Catherine Keener, Kevin McKidd, Joe Pantoliano, Uma Thurman, Julian Richings, Dylan Neal, Erica Cerra, Stefanie von Pfetten, Dimitri Lekkos, Ona Grauer, Serinda Swan, Conrad Coates, Ray Winstone, Luke Camilleri, Maria Olsen, Annie Ilonzeh, Tania Saulnier, Christie Laing, Marie Avgeropoulos, Marielle Jaffe, Alexis Knapp, Chelan Simmons, Natassia Malthe, Andrea Brooks, Max Van Ville	
F E B R U A R Y	12	My Name Is Khan	Fox Searchlight Pictures / 20th Century Fox / Image Nation Abu Dhabi	Karan Johar (director); Shah Rukh Khan, Kajol, Jimmy Shergill, Tanay Chheda	
F E B R U A R Y	12	Valentine's Day	New Line Cinema	Garry Marshall (director); Katherine Fugate (screenplay); Jessica Alba, Kathy Bates, Jessica Biel, Bradley Cooper, Eric Dane, Patrick Dempsey, Héctor Elizondo, Jamie Foxx, Jennifer Garner, Topher Grace, Anne Hathaway, Carter Jenkins, Ashton Kutcher, Queen Latifah, Taylor Lautner, George Lopez, Shirley MacLaine, Emma Roberts, Julia Roberts, Taylor Swift, Matthew Walker, Larry Miller, Katherine LaNasa, Kristen Schaal, Christine Lakin, Kathleen Marshall, Shea Curry, Jonathan Morgan Heit, Brooklynn Proulx, Scott Marshall, Cleo King, Rance Howard, Hannah Storm, Mike Greenberg, Mike Golic, Paul Williams, Aramis Knight, Joe Mantegna, Bryce Robinson, Garry Marshall	
F E B R U A R Y	12	The Wolfman	Universal Pictures / Relativity Media	Joe Johnston (director); Andrew Kevin Walker, David Self (screenplay); Benicio del Toro, Anthony Hopkins, Emily Blunt, Hugo Weaving, Geraldine Chaplin, Art Malik, Antony Sher, David Schofield, David Sterne, Simon Merrells, Michael Cronin, Nicholas Day, Clive Russell, Asa Butterfield, Rick Baker, Cristina Contes, Roger Frost	
F E B R U A R Y	19	Shutter Island	Paramount Pictures / Phoenix Pictures	Martin Scorsese (director); Laeta Kalogridis (screenplay); Leonardo DiCaprio, Mark Ruffalo, Ben Kingsley, Max von Sydow, Michelle Williams, Emily Mortimer, Patricia Clarkson, Jackie Earle Haley, Ted Levine, John Carroll Lynch, Elias Koteas, Robin Bartlett, Christopher Denham, Joe Sikora, Ruby Jerins, Matthew Cowles, Ken Cheeseman, Steve Witting, Curtiss I. Cook, Ray Anthony Thomas	
F E B R U A R Y	19	The Good Guy	Roadside Attractions	Alexis Bledel, Scott Porter, Bryan Greenberg, Anna Chlumsky, Aaron Yoo, Andrew McCarthy	
F E B R U A R Y	19	Happy Tears	Roadside Attractions	Demi Moore, Rip Torn	
F E B R U A R Y	26	Cop Out	Warner Bros. Pictures	Kevin Smith (director); Mark Cullen, Robb Cullen (screenplay); Bruce Willis, Tracy Morgan, Kevin Pollak, Seann William Scott, Sean Cullen, Adam Brody, Guillermo Diaz, Michelle Trachtenberg, Jason Lee, Francie Swift, Rashida Jones, Jim Norton, Susie Essman, John D'Leo, Adrian Martinez, Juan Carlos Hernandez, Cory Fernandez, Fred Armisen, Hannah Ware, Ana de la Reguera, Mark Consuelos, Jordan Carlos, Robb Cullen	
F E B R U A R Y	26	The Crazies	Overture Films	Breck Eisner (director); Scott Kosar, Ray Wright (screenplay); Timothy Olyphant, Radha Mitchell, Joe Anderson, Danielle Panabaker, Christie Lynn Smith, Brett Rickaby, Preston Bailey, John Aylward, Joe Reegan, Glenn Morshower, Larry Cedar, Gregory Sporleder, Mike Hickman, Lisa K. Wyatt, Justin Welborn, Lynn Lowry	
F E B R U A R Y	26	The Art of the Steal	Sundance Selects	Don Argott	
F E B R U A R Y	26	Defendor	Alliance Films	Peter Stebbings (director/screenplay); Woody Harrelson, Kat Dennings, Elias Koteas, Sandra Oh, Michael Kelly	
F E B R U A R Y	26	Easier with Practice	Lantern Lane Entertainment	Brian Geraghty	
F E B R U A R Y	26	Formosa Betrayed	Screen Media Films	Adam Kane (director); Will Tiao, Charlie Stratton (screenplay); James Van Der Beek, Wendy Crewson, Will Tiao, Tzi Ma	
F E B R U A R Y	26	The Yellow Handkerchief	Samuel Goldwyn Films	William Hurt, Kristen Stewart	
M A R C H	5	Alice in Wonderland	Walt Disney Pictures	Tim Burton (director); Linda Woolverton (screenplay); Johnny Depp, Mia Wasikowska, Helena Bonham Carter, Anne Hathaway, Crispin Glover, Michael Sheen, Alan Rickman, Stephen Fry, Matt Lucas, Paul Whitehouse, Barbara Windsor, Timothy Spall, Christopher Lee, Michael Gough, Imelda Staunton, Lindsay Duncan, Jemma Powell, Geraldine James, Tim Pigott-Smith, Marton Csokas, Leo Bill, Frances de la Tour, Eleanor Tomlinson, Lucy Davenport, Joel Swetow, Jessica Oyelowo, Ethan Cohn, Jim Carter, Frank Welker, Eleanor Gecks, Holly Hawkins	
M A R C H	5	Brooklyn's Finest	Overture Films	Antoine Fuqua (director); Michael C. Martin (screenplay); Richard Gere, Don Cheadle, Ethan Hawke, Wesley Snipes, Will Patton, Lili Taylor, Michael Kenneth Williams, Brian F. O'Byrne, Shannon Kane, Ellen Barkin, Vincent D'Onofrio, Wass Stevens, Armando Riesco, Wade Allain Marcus, Logan Marshall Green, Jesse Williams, Hassan Iniko Johnson, Jas Anderson, Raquel Castro, John D'Leo, Stella Maeve, Robert John Burke, Sarah Thompson, Cle Sloan, Thomas Jefferson Byrd, Lela Rochon Fuqua, Isiah Whitlock Jr., Tobias Truvillion, Tawny Cypress, Robert Harris, William Lee Scott	
M A R C H	12	Our Family Wedding	Fox Searchlight Pictures	Rick Famuyiwa (director/screenplay); Wayne Conley, Malcolm Spellman (screenplay); Forest Whitaker, America Ferrera, Carlos Mencia, Regina King, Lance Gross, Diana Maria Riva, Lupe Ontiveros, Anjelah Johnson, Charlie Murphy, Shannyn Sossamon, Tonita Castro, Anna Maria Horsford, Warren Sapp, Shondrella Avery, Skylan Brooks, Castulo Guerra, James Lesure, Alejandro Patino, Ella Joyce, Sy Richardson, Noel G., Caroline Aaron, Hayley Marie Norman, Gina Rodriguez, Harry Shum Jr., Taye Diggs	
M A R C H	12	Remember Me	Summit Entertainment	Allen Coulter (director); Will Fetters (screenplay); Robert Pattinson, Emilie de Ravin, Chris Cooper, Lena Olin, Pierce Brosnan, Ruby Jerins, Gregory Jbara, Tate Ellington, Kate Burton, Peyton List, Meghan Markle, Emily Wickersham, Kelli Barrett, Jon Trosky, Olga Merediz, Andrea Navedo, Martha Plimpton	
M A R C H	12	She's Out of My League	Paramount Pictures / DreamWorks Pictures / Mosaic Media Group	Jim Field Smith (director); Sean Anders, John Morris (screenplay); Jay Baruchel, Alice Eve, T.J. Miller, Mike Vogel, Nate Torrence, Lindsay Sloane, Kyle Bornheimer, Jessica St. Clair, Krysten Ritter, Adam LeFevre, Geoff Stults, Trevor Eve, Debra Jo Rupp, Kim Shaw, Jasika Nicole, Hayes McArthur, Andrew Daly, Sharon Maughan	
M A R C H	12	Children of Invention	Sasquatch Films	Tze Chun (director)	
M A R C H	12	Stolen	IFC Films	Anders Anderson (director); Glenn Taranto (screenplay); Jon Hamm, Josh Lucas	
M A R C H	19	The Bounty Hunter	Columbia Pictures / Relativity Media / Original Film	Andy Tennant (director); Sarah Thorp (screenplay); Jennifer Aniston, Gerard Butler, Jason Sudeikis, Jeff Garlin, Cathy Moriarty, Ritchie Coster, Siobhan Fallon Hogan, Peter Greene, Dorian Missick, Carol Kane, Adam LeFevre, Christine Baranski, Matt Malloy, Christian Borle, David Costabile, Mary Testa, Joel Marsh Garland, Adam Rose, Gio Perez	
M A R C H	19	Diary of a Wimpy Kid	20th Century Fox / Fox 2000 Pictures	Thor Freudenthal (director); Jackie Filgo, Jeff Filgo, Jeff Judah, Gabe Sachs (screenplay); Zachary Gordon, Robert Capron, Devon Bostick, Steve Zahn, Rachael Harris, Chloë Grace Moretz, Karan Brar, Grayson Russell, Conner and Owen Fielding, Laine MacNeil, Alex Ferris, Andrew McNee, Belita Moreno, Cainan Wiebe, Harrison Houde, Karin Konoval, Raugi Yu, Alfred E. Humphreys, Brett Dier, Cindy Busby, Gabrielle Rose, Peter New, Jennifer Clement, Ryan Grantham, Kaye Capron, Nicholas Carey, Donnie McNeil, Samuel Patrick Chu, Rob LaBelle, Severin Korfer, Owen Best, Samantha Page, Ava Hughes, Jacob Smith, Adam Osei, Jake D. Smith, Sean Bygrave, Paul Hubbard, Nathaniel Marten, L.J. Benet, Dylan Bell, Madison Bell	
M A R C H	19	Repo Men	Universal Pictures / Relativity Media	Miguel Sapochnik (director); Eric Garcia, Garrett Lerner (screenplay); Jude Law, Forest Whitaker, Alice Braga, Liev Schreiber, Carice van Houten, Chandler Canterbury, Joe Pingue, Liza Lapira, Tiffany Espensen, Yvette Nicole Brown, RZA, Robin Atkin Downes, John Leguizamo	
M A R C H	19	City Island	Anchor Bay Films	Raymond De Felitta (director/screenplay); Andy García, Julianna Margulies, Steven Strait, Alan Arkin, Emily Mortimer, Ezra Miller, Dominik García-Lorido, Carrie Baker Reynolds, Hope Glendon-Ross, Louis Mustillo, Curtiss Cook, Sharon Angela, Matthew Arkin, Lynn Collins	
M A R C H	19	Greenberg	Focus Features	Noah Baumbach (director/screenplay); Ben Stiller, Greta Gerwig, Rhys Ifans, Jennifer Jason Leigh, Merritt Wever, Chris Messina, Susan Traylor, Brie Larson, Juno Temple, Mark Duplass, Dave Franco, Jake Paltrow	
M A R C H	19	Kimjongilia	Lorber Films	N.C. Heiken (director/screenplay)	
M A R C H	19	The Killing Jar	New Films International	Mark Young (director/screenplay); Danny Trejo	
M A R C H	19	The Runaways	Apparition	Floria Sigismondi (director/screenplay); Dakota Fanning, Kristen Stewart, Michael Shannon, Riley Keough, Stella Maeve, Scout Taylor-Compton, Johnny Lewis, Alia Shawkat, Hannah Marks, Keir O'Donnell, Tatum O'Neal, Brett Cullen, Brendan Sexton III, Robert Romanus, Nick Eversman, Allie Grant, Alejandro Patino	
M A R C H	23	Free Willy: Escape from Pirate's Cove	Warner Home Video / Warner Premiere / ApolloMovie Beteiligungs/ Film Africa Worldwide	Will Geiger (director/screenplay); Bindi Irwin, Beau Bridges, Bongolethu Mbutuma, Louw Venter, Getmore Sithole, Robert Irwin, Siyabulela Ramba, Stephen Jennings, Matthew Roberts, Heima Jaffa, Kevin Otto, Darron Meyer	
M A R C H	26	Hot Tub Time Machine	Metro-Goldwyn-Mayer / United Artists	Steve Pink (director); Josh Heald, Sean Anders, John Morris (screenplay); John Cusack, Rob Corddry, Craig Robinson, Clark Duke, Chevy Chase, Lizzy Caplan, Crispin Glover, Sebastian Stan, Lyndsy Fonseca, Charlie McDermott, Collette Wolfe, Crystal Lowe, Jessica Paré, Kellee Stewart, William Zabka, Diora Baird, Thomas Lennon, Julia Maxwell, Geoff Gustafson, Josh Heald	
M A R C H	26	How to Train Your Dragon	Paramount Pictures / DreamWorks Animation	Chris Sanders, Dean DeBlois (directors/screenplay); Will Davies (screenplay); Jay Baruchel, Gerard Butler, Craig Ferguson, America Ferrera, Jonah Hill, Christopher Mintz-Plasse, T.J. Miller, Kristen Wiig, Robin Atkin Downes, Kieron Elliott, Ashley Jensen, David Tennant, Philip McGrade	
M A R C H	26	Chloe	Sony Pictures Classics / StudioCanal / The Montecito Picture Company	Atom Egoyan (director); Erin Cressida Wilson (screenplay); Julianne Moore, Liam Neeson, Amanda Seyfried, Max Thieriot, R.H. Thomson, Nina Dobrev, Julie Khaner, Meghan Heffern, Natalie Lisinska, Laura De Carteret, Tiffany Knight, Mishu Vellani	
M A R C H	26	Waking Sleeping Beauty	Walt Disney Pictures	Don Hahn	
M A R C H	31	The Last Song	Touchstone Pictures	Julie Anne Robinson (director); Nicholas Sparks, Jeff Van Wie (screenplay); Miley Cyrus, Liam Hemsworth, Greg Kinnear, Kelly Preston, Bobby Coleman, Nick Lashaway, Carly Chaikin, Kate Vernon, Nick Searcy, Melissa Ordway, Rhoda Griffis, Lance E. Nichols, Adam Barnett	

== April–June ==
Opening		Title	Production company	Cast and crew	Ref.
A P R I L	2	Clash of the Titans	Warner Bros. Pictures / Legendary Pictures	Louis Leterrier (director); Lawrence Kasdan, Travis Beacham, Phil Hay, Matt Manfredi (screenplay); Sam Worthington, Liam Neeson, Ralph Fiennes, Jason Flemyng, Gemma Arterton, Alexa Davalos, Mads Mikkelsen, Luke Evans, Izabella Miko, Liam Cunningham, Hans Matheson, Ashraf Barhom, Ian Whyte, Nicholas Hoult, Vincent Regan, Polly Walker, Luke Treadaway, Pete Postlethwaite, Elizabeth McGovern, Ross Mullan, Martin McCann, Rory McCann, Kaya Scodelario, Alexander Siddig, Tamer Hassan, Danny Huston, William Houston, Jamie Sives, Nina Young, Jane March, Nathalie Cox, Agyness Deyn, Natalia Vodianova	
A P R I L	2	Why Did I Get Married Too?	Lionsgate / Tyler Perry Studios	Tyler Perry (director/screenplay); Janet Jackson, Tyler Perry, Jill Scott, Sharon Leal, Malik Yoba, Richard T. Jones, Tasha Smith, Lamman Rucker, Michael Jai White, Louis Gossett Jr., Cicely Tyson, Valarie Pettiford, K Callan, Rodney Peete, Victor Webster, Dwayne Johnson	
A P R I L	2	Don McKay	Image Entertainment	Jake Goldberger (director/screenplay); Thomas Haden Church, Elisabeth Shue, Melissa Leo, James Rebhorn, M. Emmet Walsh, Pruitt Taylor Vince, Keith David	
A P R I L	2	The Greatest	Paladin Films	Shana Feste (director/screenplay); Pierce Brosnan, Carey Mulligan, Aaron Johnson	
A P R I L	9	Date Night	20th Century Fox / 21 Laps Entertainment	Shawn Levy (director); Josh Klausner (screenplay); Steve Carell, Tina Fey, Mark Wahlberg, James Franco, Leighton Meester, Common, Taraji P. Henson, Kristen Wiig, Mila Kunis, Mark Ruffalo, William Fichtner, will.i.am, Jimmi Simpson, Bill Burr, Gal Gadot, Olivia Munn, J.B. Smoove, Nick Kroll, Max Charles, Jon Bernthal, Ari Graynor, Jonathan Morgan Heit, Lauren Weedman, Gillian Vigman, Samantha Bee, Ray Liotta	
A P R I L	9	Letters to God	Vivendi Entertainment	David Nixon (director); Patrick Doughtie (co-director); Patrick Doughtie (story/screenplay); Art D'Alessandro, Sandra Thrift, Cullen Douglas (writers); Bailee Madison, Robyn Lively, Ralph Waite	
A P R I L	9	After.Life	Anchor Bay Films	Agnieszka Wojtowicz-Vosloo (director); Agnieszka Wojtowicz-Vosloo, Paul Vosloo (screenplay); Christina Ricci, Liam Neeson, Justin Long, Josh Charles, Chandler Canterbury	
A P R I L	9	The Black Waters of Echo's Pond	Project 8 Films	Gabriel Bologna (director); Gabriel Bologna & Sean Clark (screenplay); Robert Patrick, Danielle Harris, James Duval, Arcadiy Golubovich, Electra Avellan, Elise Avellan, Nick Mennell, Sean Lawlor	
A P R I L	9	La Mission	Screen Media Films	Peter Bratt (director/screenplay); Benjamin Bratt, Erika Alexander, Jeremy Ray Valdez, Jesse Borrego, Talisa Soto	
A P R I L	9	When You're Strange	Abramorama / Rhino Records	Tom DiCillo (director/screenplay); John Densmore, Robby Krieger, Ray Manzarek, Jim Morrison, Johnny Depp	
A P R I L	16	Death at a Funeral	Screen Gems	Neil LaBute (director); Dean Craig (screenplay); Peter Dinklage, Martin Lawrence, James Marsden, Tracy Morgan, Chris Rock, Zoe Saldaña, Luke Wilson, Keith David, Loretta Devine, Danny Glover, Regina Hall, Kevin Hart, Columbus Short, Ron Glass, Regine Nehy, Robert Lee Minor	
A P R I L	16	Kick-Ass	Lionsgate / Marv Films	Matthew Vaughn (director/screenplay); Jane Goldman (screenplay); Aaron Johnson, Christopher Mintz-Plasse, Chloë Grace Moretz, Mark Strong, Nicolas Cage, Lyndsy Fonseca, Clark Duke, Evan Peters, Sophie Wu, Omari Hardwick, Stu Riley, Michael Rispoli, Dexter Fletcher, Jason Flemyng, Xander Berkeley, Kofi Natei, Corey Johnson, Adrian Martinez, Omar Soriano, Garrett M. Brown, Elizabeth McGovern, Yancy Butler, Deborah Twiss, Craig Ferguson, Maurice DuBois, Dana Tyler, Lou Young	
A P R I L	16	The City of Your Final Destination	Screen Media Films	James Ivory (director); Ruth Prawer Jhabvala (screenplay); Anthony Hopkins, Laura Linney, Charlotte Gainsbourg, Norma Aleandro, Omar Metwally, Alexandra Maria Lara, Hiroyuki Sanada, Norma Argentina	
A P R I L	16	The Joneses	Roadside Attractions	Derrick Borte (director/screenplay); Demi Moore, David Duchovny, Amber Heard, Gary Cole, Ben Hollingsworth, Glenne Headly, Lauren Hutton, Chris Williams, Christine Evangelista, Jayson Warner Smith, Robert Pralgo, Tiffany Morgan, Wilbur Fitzgerald	
A P R I L	16	The Perfect Game	Slowhand Releasing	William Dear (director); W. William Winokur (screenplay); Clifton Collins Jr., Cheech Marin, Louis Gossett Jr., Emilie de Ravin, Bruce McGill, Patricia Manterola	
A P R I L	23	The Back-up Plan	CBS Films / Escape Artists	Alan Poul (director); Kate Angelo (screenplay); Jennifer Lopez, Alex O'Loughlin, Michaela Watkins, Eric Christian Olsen, Anthony Anderson, Donal Logue, Noureen DeWulf, Melissa McCarthy, Tom Bosley, Maribeth Monroe, Danneel Harris, Robert Klein, Linda Lavin, Jennifer Elise Cox, Adam Rose, Cesar Millan, Peggy Miley, Jared S. Gilmore, Rowan Blanchard, Beverly Polcyn, Frank Welker	
A P R I L	23	The Losers	Warner Bros. Pictures / Dark Castle Entertainment / Vertigo Comics / Weed Road Pictures	Sylvain White (director); Peter Berg, James Vanderbilt (screenplay); Jeffrey Dean Morgan, Idris Elba, Chris Evans, Columbus Short, Jason Patric, Zoe Saldaña, Óscar Jaenada, Holt McCallany, Peter Macdissi, Peter Francis James, Tanee McCall	
A P R I L	23	Behind the Burly Q	First Run Features	Alan Alda, Nat Bodian, Lorraine Lee, Tempest Storm, Blaze Starr, Kitty West, Taffy O'Neill, Mike Iannucci	
A P R I L	23	Boogie Woogie	IFC Films	Stellan Skarsgård, Christopher Lee, Gillian Anderson, Heather Graham, Joanna Lumley, Jaime Winstone, Amanda Seyfried, Alan Cumming	
A P R I L	23	Breath Made Visible: Anna Halprin	Argot Films	Reudi Gerber (director); Anna Halprin, Lawrence Halprin, Merce Cunningham, A.A. Leath, John Graham, Rana Halprin	
A P R I L	23	Paper Man	MPI Media Group	Jeff Daniels, Emma Stone, Ryan Reynolds, Lisa Kudrow, Kieran Culkin	
A P R I L	24	You Don't Know Jack	HBO Films	Barry Levinson (director); Adam Mazer (screenplay); Al Pacino, Danny Huston, Susan Sarandon, John Goodman, Brenda Vaccaro, James Urbaniak, Eric Lange, John Engler, Richard E. Council, Sandra Seacat, Adam Driver, Cotter Smith, David Wilson Barnes	
A P R I L	30	Furry Vengeance	Summit Entertainment / Participant Media / Imagination Abu Dhabi	Roger Kumble (director); Michael Carnes, Josh Gilbert (screenplay); Brendan Fraser, Brooke Shields, Ken Jeong, Ricky Garcia, Eugene Cordero, Patrice O'Neal, Jim Norton, Matt Prokop, Billy Bush, Angela Kinsey, Samantha Bee, Alice Drummond, Toby Huss, Skyler Samuels, Gerry Bednob, Rob Riggle, Wallace Shawn, Dee Bradley Baker	
A P R I L	30	A Nightmare on Elm Street	New Line Cinema / Platinum Dunes	Samuel Bayer (director); Wesley Strick, Eric Heisserer (screenplay); Jackie Earle Haley, Rooney Mara, Thomas Dekker, Kyle Gallner, Clancy Brown, Katie Cassidy, Connie Britton, Kellan Lutz, Aaron Yoo, Andrew Fiscella, Christian Stolte, Lia Mortensen	
A P R I L	30	Freakonomics: The Movie	Magnolia Pictures	Heidi Ewing, Alex Gibney, Seth Gordon, Rachel Grady, Eugene Jarecki, Morgan Spurlock	
A P R I L	30	Harry Brown	Samuel Goldwyn Films	Daniel Barber (director); Gary Young (screenplay); Michael Caine, Emily Mortimer, Charlie Creed-Miles, David Bradley, Iain Glen, Sean Harris, Ben Drew, Jack O'Connell, Lee Oakes, Joseph Gilgun, Liam Cunningham, Jamie Downey, Liz Daniels, Raza Jaffrey, Klariza Clayton	
A P R I L	30	Please Give	Sony Pictures Classics	Nicole Holofcener (director/screenplay); Catherine Keener, Amanda Peet, Oliver Platt, Rebecca Hall, Elizabeth Keener, Elise Ivy, Josh Pais, Sarah Steele, Ann Guilbert, Scott Cohen, Paul Sparks, Lois Smith, Thomas Ian Nicholas, Amy Wright, Griffin Frazen, Reggie Austin, Maddie Corman, Emma Myles, Rebecca Budig, Romy Rosemont, Sarah Vowell, Jason Mantzoukas, Kevin Corrigan, Elizabeth Berridge, Michael Panes, Jamie Tirelli	
M A Y	7	Iron Man 2	Paramount Pictures / Marvel Studios	Jon Favreau (director); Justin Theroux (screenplay); Robert Downey Jr., Gwyneth Paltrow, Don Cheadle, Scarlett Johansson, Sam Rockwell, Mickey Rourke, Samuel L. Jackson, Clark Gregg, John Slattery, Garry Shandling, Paul Bettany, Kate Mara, Leslie Bibb, Jon Favreau, Christiane Amanpour, Larry Ellison, Adam "DJ AM" Goldstein, Tim Guinee, Eric L. Haney, Eugene Lazarev, Stan Lee, Helena Mattsson, Anya Monzikova, Olivia Munn, Elon Musk, Bill O'Reilly, Alejandro Patiño, Rachele Brooke Smith, Seth Green, Clare Grant, Christopher Maleki, Matt McColm, Tanoai Reed	
M A Y	7	Casino Jack and the United States of Money	Jigsaw Productions	Alex Gibney (director)	
M A Y	7	The Lightkeepers	New Films International	Richard Dreyfuss, Blythe Danner	
M A Y	7	Multiple Sarcasms	Multiple Avenue Releasing	Mira Sorvino and Timothy Hutton	
M A Y	7	Mother and Child	Sony Pictures Classics	Rodrigo García (director/screenplay); Naomi Watts, Annette Bening, Kerry Washington, Jimmy Smits, Samuel L. Jackson, David Ramsey, Shareeka Epps, David Morse, Amy Brenneman, Marc Blucas, Carla Gallo, Britt Robertson, Tatyana Ali, Cherry Jones, Elpidia Carrillo, S. Epatha Merkerson, Ahmed Best, Eileen Ryan, Latanya Richardson, LisaGay Hamilton, Elizabeth Peña	
M A Y	7	The Oath	Zeitgeist Films	Laura Poitras	
M A Y	7	Trash Humpers	Drag City	Harmony Korine (director/screenplay)	
M A Y	14	Just Wright	Fox Searchlight Pictures	Sanaa Hamri (director); Michael Elliott (screenplay); Queen Latifah, Common, Paula Patton, James Pickens Jr., Pam Grier, Phylicia Rashad, Laz Alonso, Mehcad Brooks, Michael Landes, Leo Allen, Dwight Howard, Dwyane Wade, Rashard Lewis, Bobby Simmons Jr., Jalen Rose, Rajon Rondo, Chris Paul, Doris Burke, John Legend, Marv Albert, Michael R. Fratello, Kenny Smith, Stuart Scott, Elton Brand, Peter Hermann, Terence Blanchard, Brely Evans, Paolo Montalban, Rod Thorn, Neville Page	
M A Y	14	Letters to Juliet	Summit Entertainment	Gary Winick (director); José Rivera, Tim Sullivan (screenplay); Amanda Seyfried, Christopher Egan, Gael García Bernal, Vanessa Redgrave, Franco Nero, Luisa Ranieri, Marina Massironi, Milena Vukotic, Luisa De Santis, Lidia Biondi, Oliver Platt	
M A Y	14	Robin Hood	Universal Pictures / Imagine Entertainment / Relativity Media / Scott Free Productions	Ridley Scott (director); Brian Helgeland (screenplay); Russell Crowe, Mark Addy, Cate Blanchett, Mark Strong, William Hurt, Oscar Isaac, Danny Huston, Kevin Durand, Scott Grimes, Matthew Macfadyen, Eileen Atkins, Simon McBurney, Max von Sydow, Alan Doyle, Léa Seydoux, Douglas Hodge, Gerard McSorley, Robert Pugh, Jonathan Zaccaï, Mark Lewis Jones, Denis Menochet, Jessica Raine	
M A Y	14	Daddy Longlegs	Sundance Selects	Ben Safdie, Joshua Safdie (directors/screenplay)	
M A Y	14	Princess Kaiulani	Matador Pictures / Island Film Group / Trailblazer Films	Marc Forby (director); Q'orianka Kilcher, Barry Pepper, Will Patton, Shaun Evans, Jimmy Yuill, Julian Glover, Tamzin Merchant, Catherine Steadman, Kainoa Kilcher	
M A Y	14	Touching Home	CFI Releasing	Logan Miller, Noah Miller (directors/screenplay)	
M A Y	21	MacGruber	Relativity Media / Rogue Pictures / Michaels-Goldwyn	Jorma Taccone (director/screenplay); Will Forte, John Solomon (screenplay); Will Forte, Kristen Wiig, Ryan Phillippe, Val Kilmer, Powers Boothe, Maya Rudolph, Timothy V. Murphy, Chris Jericho, Montel Vontavious Porter, The Great Khali, Paul Wight, Mark Henry, Glenn Jacobs, Derek Mears, Rhys Coiro, Marielle Heller, John Bradshaw Layfield, Amar'e Stoudemire, DJ Nu-Mark	
M A Y	21	Shrek Forever After	Paramount Pictures / DreamWorks Animation	Mike Mitchell (director); Josh Klausner, Darren Lemke (screenplay); Mike Myers, Eddie Murphy, Cameron Diaz, Antonio Banderas, Julie Andrews, John Cleese, Walt Dohrn, Jon Hamm, Jane Lynch, Craig Robinson, Lake Bell, Kathy Griffin, Mary Kay Place, Kristen Schaal, Meredith Vieira, Ryan Seacrest, Cody Cameron, Larry King, Regis Philbin, Christopher Knights, Conrad Vernon, Aron Warner, Billie Hayes, Chris Miller, Mike Mitchell, James Ryan, Jack Blessing, Eddie Frierson, Ashley Boettcher, Elisa Gabrielli, Paul Pape, Jean Gilpin, Dominic Hoffman, Jake Short, Aramis Knight, Jennifer Crystal Foley, Ellery Sprayberry, Leigh French, Oliver Muirhead, Shane Sweet, Laraine Newman, Harry Van Gorkum	
M A Y	21	Holy Rollers	First Independent Pictures	Kevin Asch (director), Antonio Macia (screenplay); Jesse Eisenberg, Justin Bartha, Ari Graynor, Danny A. Abeckaser, Q-Tip, Jason Fuchs, Mark Ivanir, Hallie Kate Eisenberg, Elizabeth Marvel, David Vadim, Bern Cohen	
M A Y	21	Racing Dreams	White Buffalo Entertainment	Marshall Curry (director)	
M A Y	21	Solitary Man	Anchor Bay Films	Brian Koppelman (director/screenplay); David Levien (director); Michael Douglas, Mary-Louise Parker, Jenna Fischer, Jesse Eisenberg, Imogen Poots, Susan Sarandon, Danny DeVito, Ben Shenkman, David Costabile, Richard Schiff, Bruce Altman, Olivia Thirlby, Arthur J. Nascarella, Lenny Venito, Douglas McGrath, Gillian Jacobs	
M A Y	25	The 7 Adventures of Sinbad	The Asylum		
M A Y	27	Sex and the City 2	New Line Cinema / HBO Films / Village Roadshow Pictures	Michael Patrick King (director/screenplay); Sarah Jessica Parker, Kristin Davis, Cynthia Nixon, Kim Cattrall, Chris Noth, David Eigenberg, Evan Handler, Mario Cantone, Willie Garson, Noah Mills, Liza Minnelli, Michael T. Weiss, Kelli O'Hara, David Alan Basche, Viola Harris, Norm Lewis, Alice Eve, Lynn Cohen, Neal Bledsoe, Ron White, Selenis Leyva, Condola Rashad, Jason Lewis, Jennifer Ferrin, Miley Cyrus, Tim Gunn, Art Malik, Penelope Cruz, Omid Djalili, Raza Jaffrey, John Corbett, Max Ryan, Waleed F. Zuaiter, Goldy Notay, Megan Boone, Nick Adams, Jay Armstrong Johnson, Kyle Dean Massey, Jeffrey Omura, Andrew Rannells, Max von Essen, Tuesday Knight	
M A Y	28	Prince of Persia: The Sands of Time	Walt Disney Pictures / Jerry Bruckheimer Films	Mike Newell (director); Carlo Bernard (screenplay); Jake Gyllenhaal, Gemma Arterton, Ben Kingsley, Alfred Molina, Toby Kebbell, Ronald Pickup, Reece Ritchie, Richard Coyle, Steve Toussaint, Darwin Shaw, Gísli Örn Garðarsson	
M A Y	28	Survival of the Dead	Magnolia Pictures	George A. Romero (director); Alan van Sprang, Devon Bostick	
M A Y	29	The Special Relationship	HBO Films / BBC Films	Richard Loncraine (director); Peter Morgan (screenplay); Michael Sheen, Dennis Quaid, Hope Davis, Helen McCrory, Adam Godley, Demetri Goritsas, John Schwab, Kerry Shale, Lara Pulver, Rufus Wright, Matthew Marsh, Gerry Adams, Tony Blair, George H. W. Bush, Barbara Bush, George W. Bush, James Callaghan, Jimmy Carter, Dick Cheney, Winston Churchill, Bill Clinton, Dwight D. Eisenhower, Al Gore, William Hague, Edward Heath, Richard Holbrooke, Lady Bird Johnson, Lyndon B. Johnson, Jacqueline Kennedy, John F. Kennedy, Monica Lewinsky, Harold Macmillan, John Major, Martin McGuinness, Slobodan Milosevic, Richard Nixon, Ronald Reagan, Nancy Reagan, Franklin D. Roosevelt, Denis Thatcher, Margaret Thatcher, Harry S. Truman, Harold Wilson, Boris Yeltsin, Eric Meyers, Marc Rioufol, Mark Bazeley, Chris Wilson, Max Cottage	
J U N E	4	Get Him to the Greek	Universal Pictures / Relativity Media / Spyglass Entertainment / Apatow Productions	Nicholas Stoller (director/screenplay); Jonah Hill, Russell Brand, Rose Byrne, Elisabeth Moss, Sean Combs, Aziz Ansari, Nick Kroll, Ellie Kemper, Kali Hawk, Jake Johnson, Colm Meaney, Karl Theobald, Greg "Mr. Gee" Sekweyama, Jamie Sives, Carla Gallo, T.J. Miller, Neal Brennan, Lino Facioli, Jim Piddock, Kristen Schaal, Kristen Bell, Ato Essandoh, Carlos Jacott, Stephanie Faracy, Lindsey Broad, DeRay Davis, Rino Romano, Lars Ulrich, Tom Felton, Christina Aguilera, Pink, Kurt Loder, Meredith Vieira, Mario Lopez, Pharrell Williams, Paul Krugman, Rick Schroder, Zöe Salmon, Meghan Markle, Dee Snider, Holly Weber, Billy Bush, Rachel Roberts	
J U N E	4	Killers	Lionsgate	Robert Luketic (director); Bob DeRosa, Ted Griffin (screenplay); Ashton Kutcher, Katherine Heigl, Tom Selleck, Catherine O'Hara, Katheryn Winnick, Kevin Sussman, Lisa Ann Walter, Casey Wilson, Rob Riggle, Martin Mull, Alex Borstein, Usher Raymond IV, LeToya Luckett, Michael Daniel Cassady, Larry Joe Campbell, Mary Birdsong, Ric Reitz, Ariel Winter	
J U N E	4	Marmaduke	20th Century Fox / Regency Enterprises / Davis Entertainment	Tom Dey (director); Tim Rasmussen, Vince Di Meglio (screenplay); Owen Wilson, George Lopez, Emma Stone, Fergie, Christopher Mintz-Plasse, Steve Coogan, Kiefer Sutherland, Damon Wayans Jr., Marlon Wayans, Sam Elliott, Ice-T, Lee Pace, Judy Greer, William H. Macy, Raugi Yu, Finley Jacobsen, Caroline Sunshine, Milana Haines, Frank Topol, Glenn McCuen, David Walliams, Heather Doerksen, Todd Glass, Devon Werkheiser, Chris Colfer, Ryan Devlin, Jeff Garcia, Anjelah N. Johnson, Liza Lapira, Josh Gad, Eddie "Piolin" Sotelo, Jack McGee	
J U N E	4	Splice	Warner Bros. Pictures / Dark Castle Entertainment / Gaumont / Copperheart Entertainment	Vincenzo Natali (director/screenplay); Antoinette Terry Bryant, Doug Taylor (screenplay); Adrien Brody, Sarah Polley, Delphine Chanéac, David Hewlett, Brandon McGibbon, Simona Maicanescu, Abigail Chu	
J U N E	4	Finding Bliss	Phase 4 Films	Julie Davis (director/screenplay); Leelee Sobieski, Kristen Johnston, Matt Davis, Denise Richards, Jamie Kennedy	
J U N E	4	Gone with the Pope	Grindhouse Releasing	Bill Boyd, John Bruno, Carl Cocomo, Lorenzo Dardado, Paul DiAmico, Steve DiBiaso, Nola Hand, Jeanne Hibbard	
J U N E	4	Living in Emergency	Truly Indie	Chris Brasher, Davinder Gill, Tom Krueger, Chiara Lepora	
J U N E	4	Rosencrantz and Guildenstern Are Undead	Indican Pictures	Jake Hoffman, Devon Aoki, John Ventimiglia, Kris Lemche, Ralph Macchio, Joey Kern	
J U N E	11	The A-Team	20th Century Fox / Dune Entertainment	Joe Carnahan (director/screenplay); Brian Bloom, Skip Woods (screenplay); Liam Neeson, Bradley Cooper, Quinton "Rampage" Jackson, Sharlto Copley, Jessica Biel, Patrick Wilson, Gerald McRaney, Henry Czerny, Yul Vazquez, Brian Bloom, Maury Sterling, Terry Chen, Omari Hardwick, C. Ernst Harth, Christian Tessier, Joe Carnahan, Tom Butler, Dirk Benedict, Dwight Schultz, Corey Burton, Hélène Cardona, Jon Hamm	
J U N E	11	The Karate Kid	Columbia Pictures / Overbrook Entertainment / Jerry Weintraub Productions	Harald Zwart (director); Christopher Murphey (screenplay); Jackie Chan, Jaden Smith, Taraji P. Henson, Yu Rongguang, Zhang Bo, Wenwen Han, Zhenwei Wang, Luke Carberry, Shijia Lü, Ji Wang, Zhensu Wu, Zhiheng Wang, Yi Zhao, Cameron Hillman, Ghye Samuel Brown	
J U N E	11	12th & Delaware	Loki Films	Heidi Ewing, Rachel Grady (directors)	
J U N E	11	Joan Rivers: A Piece of Work	IFC Films	Ricki Stern (director/screenplay); Anne Sundberg (director); Joan Rivers, Melissa Rivers, Don Rickles, Kathy Griffin, Richard Belzer, Garry Shandling, Lily Tomlin, Bill Maher, Brad Garrett, Greg Giraldo, Jeffrey Ross, David Muir, Billy Sammeth, Larry A. Thompson, George Burns, George Carlin, Johnny Carson, Phyllis Diller, Annie Duke, Edgar Rosenberg, Donald Trump, Denis Leary, Jack Paar	
J U N E	11	The Lottery	Variance Films	Madeleine Sackler	
J U N E	11	Winter's Bone	Roadside Attractions	Debra Granik (director/screenplay); Anne Rosellini (screenplay); Jennifer Lawrence, John Hawkes, Garret Dillahunt, Dale Dickey, Tate Taylor, Sheryl Lee	
J U N E	18	Jonah Hex	Warner Bros. Pictures / Legendary Pictures / DC Comics / Weed Road Pictures	Jimmy Hayward (director); Neveldine & Taylor (screenplay); Josh Brolin, John Malkovich, Megan Fox, Michael Fassbender, Will Arnett, John Gallagher Jr., Tom Wopat, Michael Shannon, Wes Bentley, Julia Jones, J.D. Evermore, Jimmy Hayward, Seth Gabel, Aidan Quinn, Rance Howard, Michael Papajohn, Lance Reddick, Jeffrey Dean Morgan, Brent Hinds	
J U N E	18	Toy Story 3	Walt Disney Pictures / Pixar Animation Studios	Lee Unkrich (director); Michael Arndt (screenplay); Tom Hanks, Tim Allen, Joan Cusack, Ned Beatty, Don Rickles, Michael Keaton, Wallace Shawn, John Ratzenberger, Estelle Harris, John Morris, Jodi Benson, Emily Hahn, Laurie Metcalf, Blake Clark, Teddy Newton, Bud Luckey, Beatrice Miller, Timothy Dalton, Lori Alan, Kristen Schaal, Jeff Garlin, Bonnie Hunt, John Cygan, Jeff Pidgeon, Whoopi Goldberg, Jack Angel, R. Lee Ermey, Jan Rabson, Richard Kind, Erik von Detten, Jack Willis, Carlos Alazraqui, Teresa Ganzel, Jess Harnell, Danny Mann, Laraine Newman, Colleen O'Shaughnessey, Bob Peterson, Jerome Ranft, Lee Unkrich, James Kevin Ward, Javier Fernández Peña, Charlie Bright, Amber Kroner, Brianna Maiwand, Woody Smith	
J U N E	18	45365	Seventh Art Releasing	Ross brothers	
J U N E	18	8: The Mormon Proposition	Red Flag Releasing	Reed Cowan	
J U N E	18	Cyrus	Fox Searchlight Pictures	Jay Duplass, Mark Duplass (directors/screenplay); John C. Reilly, Jonah Hill, Marisa Tomei, Catherine Keener, Matt Walsh, Katie Aselton, Jamie Donnelly, Tim Guinee, Steve Zissis, Elisa Gabrielli, Bridget Hoffman, Edie Mirman, Michelle Ruff	
J U N E	18	The Killer Inside Me	IFC Films	Michael Winterbottom (director); John Curran (screenplay); Casey Affleck, Jessica Alba, Kate Hudson, Ned Beatty, Elias Koteas, Tom Bower, Simon Baker, Bill Pullman, Brent Briscoe, Matthew Maher, Liam Aiken, Jay R. Ferguson	
J U N E	18	Stonewall Uprising	First Run Features	Kate Davis, David Heilbroner (directors); David Heilbroner (screenplay)	
J U N E	23	Knight and Day	20th Century Fox / Regency Enterprises	James Mangold (director); Patrick O'Neill (screenplay); Tom Cruise, Cameron Diaz, Peter Sarsgaard, Jordi Mollà, Viola Davis, Paul Dano, Falk Hentschel, Marc Blucas, Maggie Grace, Dale Dye, Celia Weston, Gal Gadot, Nilaja Sun, Christian Finnegan, Brian Tarantina, Hélène Cardona, Olivier Martinez, Lennie Loftin, Rich Manley, Jack A. O'Connell, Trevor Loomis, Natasha Paczkowski, Lee Wesley	
J U N E	25	Grown Ups	Columbia Pictures / Relativity Media / Happy Madison Productions	Dennis Dugan (director); Adam Sandler, Fred Wolf (screenplay); Adam Sandler, Kevin James, Chris Rock, David Spade, Rob Schneider, Salma Hayek, Maria Bello, Maya Rudolph, Joyce Van Patten, Colin Quinn, Steve Buscemi, Tim Meadows, Madison Riley, Jamie Chung, Ashley Loren, Jake Goldberg, Cameron Boyce, Alexys Nycole Sanchez, Ada-Nicole Sanger, Nadji Jeter, China Anne McClain, Dan Patrick, Tim Herlihy, Blake Clark, Norm Macdonald, Jonathan Loughran, Dennis Dugan, Henriette Mantel, Alec Musser	
J U N E	25	Restrepo	Outpost Films	Tim Hetherington, Sebastian Junger (directors)	
J U N E	25	South of the Border	Cinema Libre Studio	Oliver Stone (director)	
J U N E	30	The Twilight Saga: Eclipse	Summit Entertainment	David Slade (director); Melissa Rosenberg (screenplay); Kristen Stewart, Robert Pattinson, Taylor Lautner, Ashley Greene, Jackson Rathbone, Peter Facinelli, Elizabeth Reaser, Nikki Reed, Kellan Lutz, Bryce Dallas Howard, Xavier Samuel, Billy Burke, Dakota Fanning, Jodelle Ferland, Gil Birmingham, Cameron Bright, Anna Kendrick, Michael Welch, Sarah Clarke, Christian Serratos, Justin Chon, Monique Ganderton, Jack Huston, Daniel Cudmore, Kirsten Prout, Chaske Spencer, Catalina Sandino Moreno	
J U N E	30	Love Ranch	E1 Entertainment	Taylor Hackford (director); Mark Jacobson (screenplay); Helen Mirren, Joe Pesci, Sergio Peris-Mencheta, Bryan Cranston, Gina Gershon, Scout Taylor-Compton, Taryn Manning, Gil Birmingham, Bai Ling, Rick Gomez, Leslie Jordan, M. C. Gainey, Elise Neal, Emily Rios, Melora Walters, Raoul Trujillo, Wendell Pierce, Harve Presnell, Maulik Pancholy	

== July–September ==
Opening		Title	Production company	Cast and crew	Ref.
J U L Y	1	The Last Airbender	Paramount Pictures / Nickelodeon Movies / Blinding Edge Pictures / The Kennedy/Marshall Company	M. Night Shyamalan (director/screenplay); Noah Ringer, Dev Patel, Nicola Peltz, Jackson Rathbone, Shaun Toub, Aasif Mandvi, Cliff Curtis, Seychelle Gabriel, Katharine Houghton, Francis Guinan, Damon Gupton, Summer Bishil, Randall Duk Kim, Keong Sim, John Noble, Dee Bradley Baker, Ben Cooke, J.W. Cortes, Jessica Andres	
J U L Y	2	Great Directors	Anisma Films	Angela Ismailos (director/screenplay); Bernardo Bertolucci, Catherine Braillat, David Lynch	
J U L Y	9	Despicable Me	Universal Pictures / Illumination Entertainment	Chris Renaud, Pierre Coffin (directors); Cinco Paul, Ken Daurio (screenplay); Steve Carell, Jason Segel, Russell Brand, Miranda Cosgrove, Dana Gaier, Elsie Fisher, Will Arnett, Kristen Wiig, Julie Andrews, Pierre Coffin, Chris Renaud, Jemaine Clement, Jack McBrayer, Danny McBride, Mindy Kaling, Rob Huebel, Ken Daurio, Ken Jeong, Katie Leigh, Scott Menville, Edie Mirman, Al Rodrigo, James Kyson Lee, Tony Lee, Debi Mae West, Rene Bitorajac	
J U L Y	9	Predators	20th Century Fox / Troublemaker Studios	Nimród Antal (director); Alex Litvak, Michael Finch (screenplay); Adrien Brody, Topher Grace, Alice Braga, Walton Goggins, Oleg Taktarov, Laurence Fishburne, Danny Trejo, Louis Ozawa Changchien, Mahershalalhashbaz Ali, Derek Mears, Brian Steele, Carey L. Jones	
J U L Y	9	The Kids Are All Right	Focus Features	Lisa Cholodenko (director/screenplay); Stuart Blumberg (screenplay); Annette Bening, Julianne Moore, Mark Ruffalo, Mia Wasikowska, Josh Hutcherson, Yaya DaCosta, Zosia Mamet, Joaquín Garrido, Kunal Sharma, Eddie Hassell, Rebecca Lawrence, Lisa Eisner, Eric Eisner, James Macdonald, Stuart Blumberg	
J U L Y	9	Winnebago Man	Kino International	Ben Steinbauer (director); Jack Rebney, Joe Pickett, Nick Preuher, Douglas Rushkoff, Mike Mitchell	
J U L Y	14	The Sorcerer's Apprentice	Walt Disney Pictures / Jerry Bruckheimer Films	Jon Turteltaub (director); Doug Miro, Carlo Bernard, Matt Lopez (screenplay); Nicolas Cage, Jay Baruchel, Alfred Molina, Teresa Palmer, Toby Kebbell, Omar Benson Miller, Monica Bellucci, Alice Krige, Jake Cherry, Robert B. Capron, Peyton Roi List, Ethan Peck, Joe Lisi, Ian McShane	
J U L Y	16	Inception	Warner Bros. Pictures / Legendary Pictures / Syncopy Inc.	Christopher Nolan (director/screenplay); Leonardo DiCaprio, Ken Watanabe, Joseph Gordon-Levitt, Marion Cotillard, Elliot Page, Tom Hardy, Cillian Murphy, Tom Berenger, Michael Caine, Dileep Rao, Pete Postlethwaite, Lukas Haas, Tim Kelleher, Talulah Riley, Michael Gaston, Felix Scott, Andrew Pleavin, Hélène Cardona, Matt Vogel	
J U L Y	16	Standing Ovation	Rocky Mountain Pictures	Stewart Raffill (director/screenplay); Alexis Blesiada, Alanna P, London Clark	
J U L Y	23	Ramona and Beezus	20th Century Fox / Fox 2000 Pictures / Walden Media	Elizabeth Allen (director); Laurie Craig, Nick Pustay (screenplay); Joey King, Selena Gomez, John Corbett, Bridget Moynahan, Ginnifer Goodwin, Josh Duhamel, Jason Spevack, Sierra McCormick, Sandra Oh, Kate Zenna, Janet Wright, Hutch Dano, Patti Allan, Aila and Zanti McCubbing, Lynda Boyd	
J U L Y	23	Salt	Columbia Pictures / Relativity Media	Phillip Noyce (director); Kurt Wimmer (screenplay); Angelina Jolie, Liev Schreiber, Chiwetel Ejiofor, Daniel Olbrychski, August Diehl, Hunt Block, Andre Braugher, Olek Krupa, Corey Stoll, Gaius Charles, Zoe Lister-Jones, Tika Sumpter, Yara Shahidi, Jeremy Davidson, Michelle Ray Smith, Marion McCorry, Victoria Cartagena, Kamar de los Reyes, Victor Slezak, Mike Colter, Frank Harts, Daniel Pearce	
J U L Y	23	Countdown to Zero	Magnolia Pictures	Lucy Walker (director)	
J U L Y	23	Life During Wartime	IFC Films	Todd Solondz (director/screenplay); Ally Sheedy, Allison Janney, Ciarán Hinds, Chris Marquette, Paul Reubens, Dylan Riley Snyder, Shirley Henderson, Michael Lerner, Charlotte Rampling, Renée Taylor, Michael K. Williams, Gaby Hoffmann, Rich Pecci	
J U L Y	23	Spoken Word	Variance Films	Victor Nuñez (director); Kuno Becker, Miguel Sandoval, Monique Gabriela Curnen, Persia White, Rubén Blades	
J U L Y	30	Cats & Dogs: The Revenge of Kitty Galore	Warner Bros. Pictures / Village Roadshow Pictures	Brad Peyton (director); Ron J. Friedman, Steve Bencich (screenplay); Chris O'Donnell, Jack McBrayer, Fred Armisen, Paul Rodriguez, Kiernan Shipka, Malcolm Stewart, Pascale Hutton, James Marsden, Nick Nolte, Christina Applegate, Katt Williams, Bette Midler, Neil Patrick Harris, Sean Hayes, Wallace Shawn, Roger Moore, Joe Pantoliano, Michael Clarke Duncan, E.G. Daily, Phil LaMarr, Michael Beattie, Jeff Bennett, Grey DeLisle, Chris Parson, Bumper Robinson, Rick D. Wasserman, Roger L. Jackson, J.K. Simmons, André Sogliuzzo, Carlos Alazraqui, Eric Bradley, Cathy Cavadini, Bruce Lanoil, Karen Strassman, Len Morganti, Christopher L. Parson, Bonnie Cahoon	
J U L Y	30	Charlie St. Cloud	Universal Pictures / Relativity Media	Burr Steers (director); Burr Steers, Craig Pearce, James Schamus, Lewis Colick (screenwriters); Zac Efron, Charlie Tahan, Amanda Crew, Kim Basinger, Ray Liotta, Augustus Prew, Donal Logue, Dave Franco, Tegan Moss, Brenna O'Brien, Ted Whittall	
J U L Y	30	Dinner for Schmucks	Paramount Pictures / DreamWorks Pictures / Spyglass Entertainment / Reliance BIG Entertainment	Jay Roach (director); David Guion, Michael Handelman (screenplay); Steve Carell, Paul Rudd, Zach Galifianakis, Jemaine Clement, Stéphanie Szostak, Lucy Punch, Bruce Greenwood, David Walliams, Ron Livingston, Larry Wilmore, Kristen Schaal, P.J. Byrne, Andrea Savage, Nick Kroll, Randall Park, Lucy Davenport, Chris O'Dowd, Jeff Dunham, Octavia Spencer, Patrick Fischler, Rick Overton, Alex Borstein, Blanca Soto, Jacques A. Dehonn	
J U L Y	30	The Dry Land	Freestyle Releasing	Ryan Piers Williams (director/screenplay); America Ferrera, Wilmer Valderrama, Melissa Leo, Jason Ritter, Evan Jones, Sasha Spielberg	
J U L Y	30	The Extra Man	Magnolia Pictures	Shari Springer Berman, Robert Pulcini (directors/screenplay); Jonathan Ames (screenplay); Kevin Kline, Paul Dano, Katie Holmes, John C. Reilly, Patti D'Arbanville, Alicia Goranson, Marian Seldes, Dan Hedaya, Alex Burns, Jason Butler Harner, Lynn Cohen, John Pankow, Jackie Hoffman, Jonathan Ames	
J U L Y	30	Get Low	Sony Pictures Classics	Aaron Schneider (director); Chris Provenzano, C. Gaby Mitchell, Scott Seeke (screenplay); Robert Duvall, Sissy Spacek, Bill Murray, Lucas Black, Gerald McRaney, Bill Cobbs, Scott Cooper, Lori Beth Edgeman, Andrea Powell, Chandler Riggs, Danny Vinson, Blerim Destani, Tomasz Karolak, Andrew Stahl, Arin Logan, Rebecca Grant, Nick Searcy	
J U L Y	30	Smash His Camera	HBO Films	Leon Gast (director)	
J U L Y	30	What's the Matter with Kansas?	Ow Myeye Productions Inc.	Joe Winston	
A U G U S T	6	Flipped	Warner Bros. Pictures / Castle Rock Entertainment	Rob Reiner (director/screenplay); Andrew Scheinman (screenplay); Madeline Carroll, Callan McAuliffe, Rebecca De Mornay, Anthony Edwards, John Mahoney, Penelope Ann Miller, Aidan Quinn, Kevin Weisman, Morgan Lily, Ryan Ketzner, Cody Horn, Shane Harper, Michael Christopher Bolten, Stefanie Scott, Israel Broussard, Ashley Taylor, Matthew Gold, Jake Reiner, Gillian Pfaff	
A U G U S T	6	The Other Guys	Columbia Pictures / Mosaic Media Group / Gary Sanchez Productions	Adam McKay (director/screenplay); Chris Henchy (screenplay); Will Ferrell, Mark Wahlberg, Eva Mendes, Michael Keaton, Steve Coogan, Ray Stevenson, Samuel L. Jackson, Dwayne Johnson, Lindsay Sloane, Natalie Zea, Rob Riggle, Damon Wayans Jr., Viola Harris, Rob Huebel, Brett Gelman, Bobby Cannavale, Andy Buckley, Ben Schwartz, Adam McKay, Zach Woods, Chris Gethard, Zoe Lister-Jones, Zak Orth, Malachy McCourt, Alison Becker, Anne Heche, Ice-T, Horatio Sanz, Thomas Middleditch, Derek Jeter, Brooke Shields, Rosie Perez, Tracy Morgan, Billy Gunn, Road Dogg	
A U G U S T	6	Step Up 3D	Touchstone Pictures / Summit Entertainment	Jon Chu (director); Amy Andelson, Emily Meyer (screenplay); Rick Malambri, Adam G. Sevani, Sharni Vinson, Alyson Stoner, Stephen "tWitch" Boss, Chadd "Madd Chadd" Smith, Martín Lombard, Facundo Lombard, Daniel "Cloud" Campos, Carolina Ravassa, Harry Shum Jr., Joe Slaughter, Keith Stallworth, Kendra Andrews, Jonathan "Legacy" Perez, Oren "Flearock" Michaeli	
A U G U S T	6	Middle Men	Paramount Vantage	George Gallo (director/screenplay); Andy Weiss (screenplay); Luke Wilson, Giovanni Ribisi, Gabriel Macht, James Caan, Jacinda Barrett, Kevin Pollak, Laura Ramsey, Rade Šerbedžija, Terry Crews, Kelsey Grammer, Graham McTavish, Robert Forster, John Ashton, Jason Antoon, Martin Kove, Claudia Jordan, Hunter Gomez, Shannon Whirry	
A U G U S T	6	Twelve	Hannover House	Joel Schumacher (director); Chace Crawford, Emma Roberts, Curtis "50 Cent" Jackson, Rory Culkin, Ellen Barkin, Kiefer Sutherland	
A U G U S T	6	The Wildest Dream	National Geographic Entertainment	Alan Rickman, Conrad Anker, Hugh Dancy, Leo Houlding, Liam Neeson, Natasha Richardson, Ralph Fiennes	
A U G U S T	13	Eat Pray Love	Columbia Pictures	Ryan Murphy (director/screenplay); Jennifer Salt (screenplay); Julia Roberts, Javier Bardem, James Franco, Richard Jenkins, Viola Davis, Billy Crudup, Sophie Thompson, Mike O'Malley, Christine Hakim, Arlene Tur, Tuva Novotny, Luca Argentero, Hadi Subiyanto, Gita Reddy, Rushita Singh	
A U G U S T	13	The Expendables	Lionsgate / Millennium Films	Sylvester Stallone (director/screenplay); David Callaham (screenplay); Sylvester Stallone, Jason Statham, Jet Li, Dolph Lundgren, Randy Couture, Stone Cold Steve Austin, Terry Crews, Mickey Rourke, Bruce Willis, Eric Roberts, David Zayas, Giselle Itié, Charisma Carpenter, Gary Daniels, Amin Joseph, Lauren Jones, Arnold Schwarzenegger	
A U G U S T	13	Scott Pilgrim vs. the World	Universal Pictures	Edgar Wright (director/screenplay); Michael Bacall (screenplay); Michael Cera, Mary Elizabeth Winstead, Kieran Culkin, Chris Evans, Anna Kendrick, Brie Larson, Alison Pill, Aubrey Plaza, Brandon Routh, Jason Schwartzman, Johnny Simmons, Mark Webber, Mae Whitman, Ellen Wong, Satya Bhabha, Jean Yoon, Nelson Franklin, Bill Hader, Erik Knudsen, Thomas Jane, Clifton Collins Jr., Ben Lewis, Tennessee Thomas, Kjartan Hewitt, Michael Lazarovitch, Joe Dinicol	
A U G U S T	18	Neshoba	First Run Features	Micki Dickoff, Tony Pagano (directors)	
A U G U S T	18	The People I've Slept With	Margin Films	Quentin Lee (director); Archie Kao, Cathy Shim, Chris Zylka, Elizabeth Sung, James Shigeta, Karin Anna Cheung, Perry Smith, Randall Park, Wilson Cruz	
A U G U S T	18	Salt of this Sea	Lorber Films	Annamarie Jacir (director/screenplay)	
A U G U S T	18	Tales from Earthsea	Walt Disney Pictures / Studio Ghibli	Gorō Miyazaki (director); Gorō Miyazaki, Keiko Niwa (screenplay); Timothy Dalton, Willem Dafoe, Matt Levin, Cheech Marin, Mariska Hargitay, Blaire Restaneo, Jean Smart	
A U G U S T	18	Vampires Suck	20th Century Fox / Regency Enterprises	Jason Friedberg, Aaron Seltzer (directors/screenplay); Matt Lanter, Jenn Proske, Chris Riggi, Ken Jeong, Anneliese van der Pol, Diedrich Bader, Arielle Kebbel, B. J. Britt, Charlie Weber, Crista Flanagan, Jun Hee Lee, David DeLuise, Ike Barinholtz, Dave Foley, Randal Reeder, Nick Eversman, Zane Holtz	
A U G U S T	20	Lottery Ticket	Warner Bros. Pictures / Alcon Entertainment	Erik White (director); Abdul Williams (screenplay); Bow Wow, Ice Cube, Brandon T. Jackson, Naturi Naughton, Loretta Devine, Keith David, Terry Crews, Mike Epps, Charlie Murphy, Bill Bellamy, Gbenga Akinnagbe, Leslie Jones, Jason Weaver, Teairra Marí, T-Pain, Chris Williams, Vince Green, Malieek W. Straughter	
A U G U S T	20	Nanny McPhee and the Big Bang	Universal Pictures / StudioCanal / Relativity Media / Working Title Films	Susanna White (director); Emma Thompson (screenplay); Emma Thompson, Maggie Gyllenhaal, Rhys Ifans, Maggie Smith, Ewan McGregor, Ralph Fiennes, Bill Bailey, Katy Brand, Asa Butterfield, Lil Woods, Oscar Steer, Eros Vlahos, Rosie Taylor-Ritson, Sinead Matthews, Nonso Anozie, Daniel Mays, Ed Stoppard, Toby Sedgwick	
A U G U S T	20	Piranha 3D	Dimension Films / Atmosphere Entertainment	Alexandre Aja (director/screenplay); Elisabeth Shue, Adam Scott, Jerry O'Connell, Ving Rhames, Jessica Szohr, Steven R. McQueen, Christopher Lloyd, Richard Dreyfuss, Kelly Brook, Riley Steele, Ricardo Antonio Chavira, Paul Scheer, Cody Longo, Sage Ryan, Brooklynn Proulx, Eli Roth, Ashlynn Brooke, Bonnie Morgan, Franck Khalfoun, Jason Spisak, Gregory Nicotero	
A U G U S T	20	The Switch	Miramax Films	Josh Gordon, Will Speck (directors); Allan Loeb (screenplay); Jason Bateman, Jennifer Aniston, Patrick Wilson, Juliette Lewis, Jeff Goldblum, Caroline Dhavernas, Scott Elrod, Diane Sawyer	
A U G U S T	20	Mao's Last Dancer	ATO Pictures	Bruce Beresford (director)	
A U G U S T	20	The Tillman Story	The Weinstein Company	Pat Tillman	
A U G U S T	20	What If...	Pure Flix	Dallas Jenkins (director); Kevin Sorbo, Kristy Swanson, Debby Ryan, John Ratzenberger	
A U G U S T	27	The Last Exorcism	Lionsgate / Strike Entertainment / StudioCanal	Daniel Stamm (director); Huck Botko, Andrew Gurland (screenplay); Patrick Fabian, Ashley Bell, Iris Bahr, Louis Herthum, Caleb Landry Jones, Tony Bentley, Shanna Forrestall, Becky Fly, Logan Craig Reed, Adam Grimes	
A U G U S T	27	Takers	Screen Gems / Rainforest Films	John Luessenhop (director/screenplay); Peter Allen, Gabriel Casseus, Avery Duff (screenplay); Matt Dillon, Paul Walker, Idris Elba, Jay Hernandez, Michael Ealy, Tip 'T.I.' Harris, Chris Brown, Hayden Christensen, Zoe Saldaña, Steve Harris, Johnathon Schaech, Marianne Jean-Baptiste, Gaius Charles, Gideon Emery, Zulay Henao, Glynn Turman, Nick Turturro, Isa Briones, Gino Anthony Pesi, Benito Martinez, Andrew Fiscella	
A U G U S T	27	Avatar: Special Edition	20th Century Fox / Lightstorm Entertainment	James Cameron (director/screenplay); Sam Worthington, Zoe Saldaña, Sigourney Weaver, Giovanni Ribisi, Michelle Rodriguez, Stephen Lang, CCH Pounder, Joel David Moore, Dileep Rao, Wes Studi, Laz Alonso, Peter Mensah	
A U G U S T	27	Make-out with Violence	Factory 25	The Deagol Brothers (directors); Eric Lehning, Cody DeVos, Leah High, Shellie Marie Shartzer, Brett Miller, Tia Shearer, Josh Duensing	
S E P T E M B E R	1	The American	Focus Features	Anton Corbijn (director); Rowan Joffé (screenplay); George Clooney, Violante Placido, Thekla Reuten, Paolo Bonacelli, Irina Björklund, Johan Leysen, Filippo Timi, Anna Foglietta, Björn Granath	
S E P T E M B E R	3	Going the Distance	New Line Cinema	Nanette Burstein (director); Geoff LaTulippe (screenplay); Drew Barrymore, Justin Long, Charlie Day, Jason Sudeikis, Christina Applegate, Ron Livingston, Kelli Garner, Natalie Morales, June Diane Raphael, Rob Riggle, Leighton Meester, Kristen Schaal, Jim Gaffigan, Sarah Burns, Matt Servitto, Oliver Jackson-Cohen, Mick Hazen, Mike Birbiglia, Meredith Hagner, Ron Bottitta	
S E P T E M B E R	3	Machete	20th Century Fox / Troublemaker Studios	Robert Rodriguez (director/screenplay); Ethan Maniquis (director); Alvaro Rodriguez (screenplay); Danny Trejo, Steven Seagal, Michelle Rodriguez, Jessica Alba, Robert De Niro, Jeff Fahey, Cheech Marin, Don Johnson, Lindsay Lohan, Shea Whigham, Daryl Sabara, Gilbert Trejo, Ara Celi, Tom Savini, Billy Blair, Felix Sabates, Electra and Elise Avellan, Juan Gabriel Pareja, Tito Larriva, Cheryl "Chin" Cunningham, Nimród Antal, Rose McGowan, Stacy Keach, James Parks	
S E P T E M B E R	10	Resident Evil: Afterlife	Screen Gems / Capcom Films	Paul W. S. Anderson (director/screenplay); Milla Jovovich, Ali Larter, Wentworth Miller, Shawn Roberts, Boris Kodjoe, Kim Coates, Sergio Peris-Mencheta, Kacey Clarke, Norman Yeung, Spencer Locke, Sienna Guillory, Fulvio Cecere, Mika Nakashima	
S E P T E M B E R	17	Alpha and Omega	Lionsgate / Crest Animation Productions	Ben Gluck (director); Christopher Denk, Steve Moore (screenplay); Justin Long, Hayden Panettiere, Christina Ricci, Danny Glover, Dennis Hopper, Larry Miller, Eric Price, Vicki Lewis, Chris Carmack, Kevin Sussman, Brian Donovan, Christine Lakin, Eric Lopez, Paul Nakauchi, Bitsie Tulloch, Nika Futterman, Fred Tatasciore, Mindy Sterling, Steve Vinovich, Marcelo Tubert, Toby Huss, Aziz Ansari	
S E P T E M B E R	17	Devil	Universal Pictures / Media Rights Capital / The Night Chronicles	Drew Dowdle, John Erick Dowdle (directors); Brian Nelson (screenplay); Chris Messina, Logan Marshall-Green, Geoffrey Arend, Bojana Novakovic, Jenny O'Hara, Bokeem Woodbine, Matt Craven, Jacob Vargas, Caroline Dhavernas, Zoie Palmer, Vincent Laresca, Joseph "Joe" Cobden, Joshua "Josh" Peace	
S E P T E M B E R	17	Easy A	Screen Gems	Will Gluck (director); Bert V. Royal (screenplay); Emma Stone, Penn Badgley, Amanda Bynes, Dan Byrd, Thomas Haden Church, Patricia Clarkson, Cam Gigandet, Lisa Kudrow, Malcolm McDowell, Aly Michalka, Stanley Tucci, Fred Armisen, Juliette Goglia, Jake Sandvig, Braeden Lemasters, Mahaley Manning, Blake Hood, Stacey Travis, Eddie Applegate, Norma Michaels, Andrew Fleming, Johanna Braddy, Lalaine, Rawson Marshall Thurber, Max Crumm, Yoshi Sudarso	
S E P T E M B E R	17	The Town	Warner Bros. Pictures / Legendary Pictures / GK Films	Ben Affleck (director/screenplay); Peter Craig, Aaron Stockard (screenplay); Ben Affleck, Jon Hamm, Rebecca Hall, Jeremy Renner, Pete Postlethwaite, Chris Cooper, Blake Lively, Slaine, Titus Welliver, Chris Collins, Victor Garber	
S E P T E M B E R	17	Catfish	Relativity Media	Henry Joost, Ariel Schulman (directors); Megan Faccio, Nev Schulman, Rel Schulman	
S E P T E M B E R	17	Jack Goes Boating	Overture Films / Relativity Media	Philip Seymour Hoffman (director); Robert Glaudini (screenplay): Philip Seymour Hoffman, Amy Ryan, John Ortiz, Daphne Rubin-Vega, Thomas McCarthy, Lola Glaudini, Stephen Adly Guirgis, Elizabeth Rodriguez	
S E P T E M B E R	17	Last Day of Summer	E1 Entertainment Distribution	Vlad Yudin (director); DJ Qualls, Nikki Reed, William Sadler	
S E P T E M B E R	17	Leaves of Grass	First Look Studios	Tim Blake Nelson (director/screenplay); Edward Norton, Tim Blake Nelson, Susan Sarandon, Richard Dreyfuss, Keri Russell, Melanie Lynskey, Steve Earle, Lucy DeVito, Lee Wilkof, Ken Cheeseman, Maggie Siff, Josh Pais, Ty Burrell, Pruitt Taylor Vince, Randal Reeder	
S E P T E M B E R	18	Fred: The Movie	Nickelodeon	Clay Weiner (director); David A. Goodman (screenplay); Lucas Cruikshank, Jennette McCurdy, Pixie Lott, John Cena, Siobhan Fallon Hogan, Jake Weary, Oscar Nunez, Stephanie Courtney, Gary Anthony Williams, Chris Wylde, Jordan Black, Kevin Olson, Mak Kriksciun, Jack Coughlan	
S E P T E M B E R	21	Tinker Bell and the Great Fairy Rescue	Walt Disney Pictures / Disneytoon Studios	Bradley Raymond (director/screenplay); Jeffrey M. Howard (screenplay); Mae Whitman, Pamela Adlon, Lauren Mote, Michael Sheen, Lucy Liu, Raven-Symoné, Kristin Chenoweth, Angela Bartys, Rob Paulsen, Jeff Bennett, Jesse McCartney, Cara Dillon, Faith Prince, Bob Bergen	
S E P T E M B E R	22	You Will Meet a Tall Dark Stranger	Sony Pictures Classics	Woody Allen (director/screenplay); Antonio Banderas, Josh Brolin, Anthony Hopkins, Gemma Jones, Freida Pinto, Lucy Punch, Naomi Watts, Roger Ashton-Griffiths, Ewen Bremner, Fenella Woolgar, Neil Jackson, Jim Piddock, Celia Imrie, Pauline Collins, Anna Friel, Theo James, Alex Macqueen, Meera Syal, Anupam Kher, Natalie Walter, Christian McKay, Philip Glenister, Zak Orth	
S E P T E M B E R	24	Legend of the Guardians: The Owls of Ga'Hoole	Warner Bros. Pictures / Village Roadshow Pictures	Zack Snyder (director); John Orloff, Emil Stern (screenplay); Jim Sturgess, Hugo Weaving, Joel Edgerton, Abbie Cornish, Geoffrey Rush, Emily Barclay, Sam Neill, Helen Mirren, Ryan Kwanten, Anthony LaPaglia, Miriam Margoyles, Richard Roxburgh, David Wenham, Sacha Horler, Essie Davis, Deborra-Lee Furness, Barry Otto, Angus Sampson, Leigh Whannell, Bill Hunter	
S E P T E M B E R	24	Wall Street: Money Never Sleeps	20th Century Fox	Oliver Stone (director); Allan Loeb, Stephen Schiff (screenplay); Michael Douglas, Shia LaBeouf, Carey Mulligan, Josh Brolin, Frank Langella, Susan Sarandon, John Buffalo Mailer, Vanessa Ferlito, Eli Wallach, Maria Bartiromo, Austin Pendleton, Waltrudis Buck, John Bedford Lloyd, Jason Clarke, Oliver Stone, Anthony Scaramucci, Sean Stone, James Chanos, Jim Cramer, Noelle Beck, Graydon Carter, Natalie Morales, Michael Cumpsty, Nouriel Roubini, Warren Buffett, Sylvia Miles, Edmund Lyndeck, Tom Mardirosian, Julianne Michelle, Annie McEnroe, Carl Quintanilla, Joan Rivers, Charlie Sheen, Donald Trump, Neil Cavuto	
S E P T E M B E R	24	You Again	Touchstone Pictures	Andy Fickman (director); Moe Jelline (screenplay); Kristen Bell, Jamie Lee Curtis, Sigourney Weaver, Odette Yustman, Victor Garber, Betty White, James Wolk, Kristin Chenoweth, Sean Wing, Kyle Bornheimer, Billy Unger, Christine Lakin, Meagan Holder, Patrick Duffy, Reginald VelJohnson, Henry G. Sanders, Brytni Sarpy, Shanola Hampton, Jenna Leigh Green, Ashley Fink, Catherine Bach, Staci Keanan, Hall & Oates, Dwayne Johnson, Cloris Leachman	
S E P T E M B E R	24	Like Dandelion Dust	Downes Brothers Entertainment / Blue Collar Releasing	Jon Gunn (director); Mira Sorvino, Barry Pepper, Kate Levering, Maxwell Perry Cotton, Cole Hauser	

== October–December ==
Opening		Title	Production company	Cast and crew	Ref.
O C T O B E R	1	Case 39	Paramount Pictures / Misher Films / Anonymous Content	Christian Alvart (director); Ray Wright (screenplay); Renée Zellweger, Jodelle Ferland, Ian McShane, Bradley Cooper, Callum Keith Rennie, Adrian Lester, Kerry O'Malley, Cynthia Stevenson, Alexander Conti, Fulvio Cecere, Andrew Airlie, Sarah-Jane Redmond, Georgia Craig	
O C T O B E R	1	Hatchet II	Dark Sky Films / ArieScope Pictures	Adam Green (director/screenplay); Kane Hodder, Danielle Harris, Tony Todd, Parry Shen, Tom Holland, Alexis Peters, R.A. Mihailoff, A. J. Bowen, Ed Ackerman, David Foy, Colton Dunn, Rick McCallum, Erika Hamilton, John Carl Buechler, Kathryn Fiore, Rileah Vanderbilt, Joel Murray, Mercedes McNab, Shawn Ashmore, Emma Bell, Adam Green, Joe Lynch, Marcus Dunstan, Lloyd Kaufman, Ryan Schifrin	
O C T O B E R	1	Let Me In	Overture Films	Matt Reeves (director/screenplay); Kodi Smit-McPhee, Chloë Grace Moretz, Richard Jenkins, Elias Koteas, Cara Buono, Sasha Barrese, Chris Browning, Ritchie Coster, Dylan Minnette, Jimmy 'Jax' Pinchak, Ronald Reagan	
O C T O B E R	1	The Social Network	Columbia Pictures / Relativity Media	David Fincher (director); Aaron Sorkin (screenplay); Jesse Eisenberg, Andrew Garfield, Justin Timberlake, Armie Hammer, Max Minghella, Brenda Song, Rashida Jones, Rooney Mara, John Getz, David Selby, Douglas Urbanski, Joseph Mazzello, Wallace Langham, Dakota Johnson, Malese Jow, Trevor Wright, Shelby Young, Barry Livingston, Josh Pence, Brian Palermo, Mark Saul, Aaron Sorkin, Oliver Muirhead, Caleb Landry Jones, Jason Flemyng, Adina Porter, Riley Voelkel	
O C T O B E R	8	It's Kind of a Funny Story	Focus Features / Wayfare Entertainment Ventures LLC	Anna Boden, Ryan Fleck (directors/screenplay); Keir Gilchrist, Emma Roberts, Zach Galifianakis, Viola Davis, Zoë Kravitz, Thomas Mann, Jeremy Davies, Aasif Mandvi, Bernard White, Lauren Graham, Jim Gaffigan, Alan Aisenberg, Daniel London, Lou Myers, Matthew Maher, Adrian Martinez, Leo Allen, Mary Birdsong, Novella Nelson, Morgan Murphy, Susan Blommaert, Ned Vizzini, Laverne Cox	
O C T O B E R	8	Life as We Know It	Warner Bros. Pictures / Village Roadshow Pictures	Greg Berlanti (director); Ian Deitchman, Kristin Rusk Robinson (screenplay); Katherine Heigl, Josh Duhamel, Josh Lucas, Christina Hendricks, Hayes MacArthur, Sarah Burns, Jessica St. Clair, Rob Huebel, Melissa McCarthy, DeRay Davis, Kumail Nanjiani, Andrew Daly, Bill Brochtrup, Will Sasso, Majandra Delfino, Melissa Ponzio, Reggie Lee, Markus Flanagan, Andy Buckley, Steve Nash, Eddie Frierson, Faizon Love, Jean Smart	
O C T O B E R	8	My Soul to Take	Relativity Media / Rogue Pictures	Wes Craven (director/screenplay); Max Thieriot, John Magaro, Denzel Whitaker, Zena Grey, Nick Lashaway, Paulina Olszynski, Jeremy Chu, Emily Meade, Raúl Esparza, Jessica Hecht, Frank Grillo, Danai Gurira, Harris Yulin, Shareeka Epps, Dennis Boutsikaris, Felix Solis, Trevor St. John, Lou Sumrall, Alexandra Wilson, Michael Bell, Robert Clotworthy, Terri Douglas, Lynnanne Zager	
O C T O B E R	8	Secretariat	Walt Disney Pictures	Randall Wallace (director); Mike Rich, Sheldon Turner (screenplay); Diane Lane, John Malkovich, Dylan Walsh, James Cromwell, Kevin Connolly, Scott Glenn,	
O C T O B E R	8	I Spit on Your Grave	Anchor Bay Entertainment	Steven R. Monroe (director); Stuart Morse (screenplay); Sarah Butler, Jeff Branson, Daniel Franzese, Rodney Eastman, Chad Lindberg, Tracey Walter, Andrew Howard, Mollie Milligan, Saxon Sharbino	
O C T O B E R	8	Inside Job	Sony Pictures Classics	Charles H. Ferguson (director)	
O C T O B E R	8	Stone	Overture Films	John Curran (director); Angus MacLachlan (screenplay); Robert De Niro, Edward Norton, Milla Jovovich, Frances Conroy, Enver Gjokaj, Pepper Binkley	
O C T O B E R	15	Jackass 3D	Paramount Pictures / MTV Films / Dickhouse Productions	Jeff Tremaine (director); Preston Lacy (screenplay); Johnny Knoxville, Bam Margera, Steve-O, Wee Man, Ryan Dunn, Preston Lacy, Dave England, Chris Pontius, Danger Ehren, Paul Heyman, Phil Margera, April Margera, Mat Hoffman, Tony Hawk, Spike Jonze, Mike Judge, Rip Taylor, Eric Koston, Kerry Getz, Andy Bell, Brandon Novak, Rake Yohn, Seann William Scott, Jeff Tremaine, Manny Puig, Jared Allen, Josh Brown, Loomis Fall, Will Oldham, Edward Barbanell, The Dudesons, Nitro Circus	
O C T O B E R	15	Red	Summit Entertainment / DC Comics	Robert Schwentke (director); Erich Hoeber, Jon Hoeber (screenplay); Bruce Willis, Morgan Freeman, John Malkovich, Mary-Louise Parker, Helen Mirren, Karl Urban, Rebecca Pidgeon, Brian Cox, Richard Dreyfuss, Julian McMahon, Ernest Borgnine, James Remar, Jefferson Brown, Chris Owens, Jaqueline Fleming, Emily Kuroda, Audrey Wasilewski, Dmitry Chepovetsky, Greg Bryk, Robert Morse, Michelle Nolden	
O C T O B E R	15	Conviction	Fox Searchlight Pictures	Tony Goldwyn (director); Pamela Gray (screenplay); Hilary Swank, Sam Rockwell, Minnie Driver, Melissa Leo, Peter Gallagher, Juliette Lewis, Ari Graynor, Loren Dean, Karen Young, Clea DuVall, Owen Campbell, Conor Donovan, John Pyper-Ferguson, Ele Bardha, Marc Macaulay, Bailee Madison, Talia Balsam	
O C T O B E R	16	Scooby-Doo! Curse of the Lake Monster	Warner Premiere / Cartoon Network	Brian Levant (director); Daniel Altiere, Steven Altiere (screenplay); Robbie Amell, Kate Melton, Hayley Kiyoko, Nick Palatas, Frank Welker, Ted McGinley, Richard Moll, Nichelle Nichols, Marion Ross, Beverly Sanders	
O C T O B E R	22	Hereafter	Warner Bros. Pictures / Amblin Entertainment/The Kennedy/Marshall Company	Clint Eastwood (director); Peter Morgan (screenplay); Matt Damon, Cécile de France, Jay Mohr, Bryce Dallas Howard, Thierry Neuvic, Marthe Keller, Derek Jacobi, Lyndsey Marshal, Richard Kind, Steven R. Schirripa, Jenifer Lewis, Charlie Creed-Miles, Franz Drameh, Mylène Jampanoï, Stéphane Freiss, Laurent Bateau, Jean-Yves Berteloot, Niamh Cusack, George Costigan, Mathew Baynton, Tom Price, Frankie and George McLaren, Céline Sallette, Hélène Cardona	
O C T O B E R	22	Paranormal Activity 2	Paramount Pictures / Blumhouse Productions	Tod Williams (director); Michael R. Perry, Christopher Landon, Tom Pabst (screenplay); Katie Featherston, Micah Sloat, Molly Ephraim, Sprague Grayden, Brian Boland, Jackson Xenia Prieto, William Juan Prieto, David Bierbend, Seth Ginsberg, Vivis Colombetti	
O C T O B E R	29	Saw 3D	Lionsgate / Twisted Pictures	Kevin Greutert (director); Patrick Melton, Marcus Dunstan (screenplay); Tobin Bell, Costas Mandylor, Betsy Russell, Cary Elwes, Sean Patrick Flanery, Chad Donella, Gina Holden, Dean Armstrong, Naomi Snieckus, Sebastian Pigott, Jon Cor, Chester Bennington, Gabby West, Kim Schraner, Oluniké Adeliyi, Ish Morris, Carlos Díaz, Christine Simpson, Rachel Wilson, Tanedra Howard, Shauna MacDonald, Greg Bryk, Chris Owens, Michael Emerson, Franky G, Erik Knudsen, Bahar Soomekh, Leigh Whannell	
N O V E M B E R
N O V E M B E R	5	Due Date	Warner Bros. Pictures / Legendary Pictures	Todd Phillips (director/screenplay); Alan R. Cohen, Alan Freedland, Adam Sztykiel (screenplay); Robert Downey Jr., Zach Galifianakis, Michelle Monaghan, Juliette Lewis, Jamie Foxx, Matt Walsh, RZA, Danny McBride, Todd Phillips, Mimi Kennedy, Keegan-Michael Key, Aaron Lustig, Margo Rodríguez, Brody Stevens, Charlie Sheen, Jon Cryer	
N O V E M B E R	5	Fair Game	Summit Entertainment	Doug Liman (director); Jez Butterworth, John Butterworth (screenplay); Naomi Watts, Sean Penn, Noah Emmerich, Ty Burrell, Sam Shepard, Polly Holliday, Bruce McGill, Jessica Hecht, Norbert Leo Butz, Rebecca Rigg, Brooke Smith, Tom McCarthy, Michael Kelly, Nicholas Sadler, Iris Bahr, Tim Griffin, Liraz Charhi, Khaled El Nabawy, Anand Tiwari, David Denman, David Andrews, David Warshofsky, Geoffrey Cantor, Adam LeFevre, Nassar, Satya Bhabha, Dan Abrams, John Ashcroft, George W. Bush, Dick Cheney, Hillary Clinton, Dominique de Villepin, Peter King, Chris Matthews, Valerie Plame Wilson, Colin Powell, Dan Rather, Condoleezza Rice, Tom Ridge, Karl Rove, Joe Scarborough	
N O V E M B E R	5	For Colored Girls	Lionsgate / 34th Street Films / Tyler Perry Studios	Tyler Perry (director/screenplay); Janet Jackson, Thandie Newton, Whoopi Goldberg, Phylicia Rashad, Anika Noni Rose, Loretta Devine, Kimberly Elise, Kerry Washington, Tessa Thompson, Macy Gray, Michael Ealy, Omari Hardwick, Hill Harper, Khalil Kain, Richard Lawson	
N O V E M B E R	5	Megamind	Paramount Pictures / DreamWorks Animation	Tom McGrath (director); Alan Schoolcraft, Brent Simons (screenplay); Will Ferrell, Brad Pitt, Tina Fey, Jonah Hill, David Cross, Ben Stiller, Justin Theroux, J.K. Simmons, Rob Corddry, Tom McGrath, Christopher Knights, Mike Mitchell, Jack Blessing, Jessica Schulte	
N O V E M B E R	5	Transformers & Transformers: Revenge of the Fallen in 3-D: The Double Freeway – Re-released in 3-D	Paramount Pictures	Michael Bay (director); Shia LaBeouf, Megan Fox, John Turturro, Kevin Dunn, Julie White, Rachael Taylor, Anthony Anderson, Tyrese Gibson, Jon Voight, Josh Duhamel, Ramón Rodríguez, Isabel Lucas Voices of Peter Cullen, Hugo Weaving, Charlie Adler, Robert Foxworth, Jess Harnell, Reno Wilson, Billy West, Tom Kenny, Tony Todd, Jim Wood (cast)	
N O V E M B E R	5	127 Hours	Fox Searchlight Pictures / Pathé / Everest Entertainment	Danny Boyle (director/screenplay); Simon Beaufoy (screenplay); James Franco, Kate Mara, Amber Tamblyn, Lizzy Caplan, Clémence Poésy, Treat Williams, Kate Burton, Pieter Jan Brugge, Aron Ralston	
N O V E M B E R	5	Guy and Madeline on a Park Bench	Variance Films	Damien Chazelle (director)	
N O V E M B E R	10	Morning Glory	Paramount Pictures / Bad Robot	Roger Michell (director); Aline Brosh McKenna (screenplay); Rachel McAdams, Harrison Ford, Diane Keaton, Patrick Wilson, Jeff Goldblum, John Pankow, Matt Malloy, Ty Burrell, Patti D'Arbanville, Jeff Hiller, Linda Powell, Adrian Martinez, Maddie Corman, Chris Matthews, Morley Safer, Jonathan Bennett, Bob Schieffer, Elaine Kaufman, G-Unit, George Clooney, Eva Longoria, Condoleezza Rice	
N O V E M B E R	12	Skyline	Rogue Pictures / Relativity Media	Greg Strause, Colin Strause (director); Joshua Cordes, Liam O'Donnell (screenplay); Eric Balfour, Scottie Thompson, Brittany Daniel, Crystal Reed, Neil Hopkins, David Zayas, Donald Faison, Robin Gammell, Tanya Newbould, J. Paul Boehmer	
N O V E M B E R	12	Unstoppable	20th Century Fox / Dune Entertainment / Scott Free Productions	Tony Scott (director); Mark Bomback (screenplay); Denzel Washington, Chris Pine, Rosario Dawson, Ethan Suplee, Kevin Dunn, Kevin Corrigan, Kevin Chapman, Lew Temple, T.J. Miller, Jessy Schram, David Warshofsky, Andy Umberger, Elizabeth Mathis, Meagan Tandy, Aisha Hinds, Jeff Wincott	
N O V E M B E R	19	Harry Potter and the Deathly Hallows – Part 1	Warner Bros. Pictures / Heyday Films	David Yates (director); Steve Kloves (screenplay); Daniel Radcliffe, Rupert Grint, Emma Watson, Helena Bonham Carter, Robbie Coltrane, Warwick Davis, Ralph Fiennes, Michael Gambon, Brendan Gleeson, Richard Griffiths, John Hurt, Jason Isaacs, Alan Rickman, Fiona Shaw, Timothy Spall, Imelda Staunton, David Thewlis, Julie Walters, Bill Nighy, Mark Williams, Bonnie Wright, James Phelps, Oliver Phelps, Domhnall Gleeson, Clémence Poésy, Helen McCrory, Tom Felton, Natalia Tena, Evanna Lynch, Freddie Stroma, Frances de la Tour, Rhys Ifans, Toby Jones, Simon McBurney	
N O V E M B E R	19	The Next Three Days	Lionsgate	Paul Haggis (director/screenplay); Russell Crowe, Elizabeth Banks, Brian Dennehy, Lennie James, Olivia Wilde, Ty Simpkins, Liam Neeson, Daniel Stern, Kevin Corrigan, Jason Beghe, Aisha Hinds, Tyrone Giordano, Jonathan Tucker, Allan Steele, RZA, James Ransone, Moran Atias, Michael Buie, Trudie Styler	
N O V E M B E R	23	The Search for Santa Paws	Walt Disney Studios Home Entertainment / Keystone Entertainment	Robert Vince (director/screenplay); Anna McRoberts (screenplay); Madison Pettis, Bonnie Somerville, Wendi McLendon-Covey, John Ducey, Danny Woodburn, Kaitlyn Maher, Richard Riehle, Bill Cobbs, G. Hannelius, Patrika Darbo, Chris Coppola, Pete Gardner, Jonathan Morgan Heit, Michelle Creber, Kathryn Kirkpatrick, Diedrich Bader, Zachary Gordon, Mitchel Musso, Richard Kind, Josh Flitter, Jason Connery, Christopher Massey, Sahar Biniaz, C. Ernst Harth, Eric Keenleyside, Tom McBeath, Mikey Post, Megan Lee, Pia Mia, Eddie Pepitone, Melody B. Choi, Nicole Leduc, Michael Deyermond, Nic Novicki	
N O V E M B E R	24	Burlesque	Screen Gems	Steven Antin (director/screenplay); Cher, Christina Aguilera, Eric Dane, Cam Gigandet, Julianne Hough, Alan Cumming, Peter Gallagher, Kristen Bell, Stanley Tucci, Dianna Agron, Glynn Turman, David Walton, Terrence Jenkins, Chelsea Traille, Tanee McCall, Tyne Stecklein, Paula Van Oppen, James Brolin, Isabella Hofmann, Stephen Lee, Denise Faye, Michael Landes, Wendy Benson, Blair Redford	
N O V E M B E R	24	Faster	CBS Films / Castle Rock Entertainment	George Tillman Jr. (director); Tony Gayton, Joe Gayton (screenplay); Dwayne Johnson, Billy Bob Thornton, Maggie Grace, Carla Gugino, Oliver Jackson-Cohen, Moon Bloodgood, Courtney Gains, Lester Speight, Adewale Akinnuoye-Agbaje, Tom Berenger, Mike Epps, Xander Berkeley, Matt Gerald, Annie Corley, Jennifer Carpenter, Michael Irby	
N O V E M B E R	24	Love & Other Drugs	20th Century Fox / Fox 2000 Pictures / Regency Enterprises	Edward Zwick (director/screenplay); Charles Randolph, Marshall Herskovitz (screenplay); Jake Gyllenhaal, Anne Hathaway, Oliver Platt, Hank Azaria, Josh Gad, Gabriel Macht, Judy Greer, George Segal, Jill Clayburgh, Kate Jennings Grant, Katheryn Winnick, Kimberly Scott, Peter Friedman, Nikki DeLoach, Natalie Gold, Megan Ferguson, Michael Chernus, Michael Buffer, Maite Schwartz, Max Osinski, Scott Cohen, Jaimie Alexander	
N O V E M B E R	24	Tangled	Walt Disney Pictures / Walt Disney Animation Studios	Nathan Greno (director); Byron Howard; Mark Kennedy, Dean Wellins (screenplay); Mandy Moore, Zachary Levi, Donna Murphy, Ron Perlman, M.C. Gainey, Jeffrey Tambor, Brad Garrett, Paul F. Tompkins, Richard Kiel, Nathan Greno, Byron Howard, Tim Mertens, Michael Bell, Bob Bergen, Susanne Blakeslee, Roy Conli, Pat Fraley, Eddie Frierson, Nicholas Guest, Bridget Hoffman, Anne Lockhart, Mona Marshall, Scott Menville, Laraine Newman, Paul Pape, Fred Tatasciore, Hynden Walch, Kari Wahlgren	
D E C E M B E R	3	Black Swan	Fox Searchlight Pictures / Cross Creek Pictures	Darren Aronofsky (director); Mark Heyman, Andres Heinz, John McLaughlin (screenplay); Natalie Portman, Mila Kunis, Vincent Cassel, Barbara Hershey, Winona Ryder, Benjamin Millepied, Ksenia Solo, Kristina Anapau, Janet Montgomery, Sebastian Stan, Toby Hemingway, Mark Margolis, Sergio Torrado, Tina Sloan, Marcia Jean Kurtz, Chris Gartin, Deborah Offner, John Epperson, Tim Fain, Patrick Heusinger	
D E C E M B E R	3	I Love You Phillip Morris	Roadside Attractions	John Requa, Glenn Ficarra (directors/screenplay); Jim Carrey, Ewan McGregor, Leslie Mann, Rodrigo Santoro, Antoni Corone, Brennan Brown, Michael Mandell, Annie Golden, Marylouise Burke, Louis Herthum, Dameon Clarke, Joe Chrest, Griff Furst, Aunjanue Ellis, Michael Showers, J.D. Evermore, Marc Macaulay, Phillip Morris	
D E C E M B E R	3	Night Catches Us	Magnolia Pictures	Tanya Hamilton (director/screenplay); Kerry Washington, Anthony Mackie, Novella Nelson, Thomas Roy	
D E C E M B E R	10	The Chronicles of Narnia: The Voyage of the Dawn Treader	20th Century Fox / Fox 2000 Pictures / Walden Media	Michael Apted (director); Christopher Markus, Stephen McFeely, Michael Petroni (screenplay); Ben Barnes, Skandar Keynes, Georgie Henley, Will Poulter, Liam Neeson, William Moseley, Anna Popplewell, Tilda Swinton, Simon Pegg, Gary Sweet, Shane Rangi, Steven Rooke, Laura Brent, Bille Brown, Terry Norris, Bruce Spence, Arabella Morton, Nathaniel Parker, Roy Billing, Douglas Gresham, David Vallon	
D E C E M B E R	10	The Tourist	Columbia Pictures / GK Films / Spyglass Entertainment	Florian Henckel von Donnersmarck (director/screenplay); Julian Fellowes, Christopher McQuarrie, Jeffrey Nachmanoff (screenplay); Johnny Depp, Angelina Jolie, Timothy Dalton, Paul Bettany, Steven Berkoff, Rufus Sewell, Christian De Sica, Raoul Bova, Alessio Boni, Daniele Pecci, Bruno Wolkowitch, Mhamed Arezki, Marc Ruchmann, Nino Frassica, Igor Jijikine, Neri Marcorè, Renato Scarpa, Maurizio Casagrande, Giovanni Esposito, Giovanni Guidelli, Julien Baumgartner, François Vincentelli	
D E C E M B E R	10	The Tempest	Touchstone Pictures / Miramax Films	Julie Taymor (director/screenplay); Helen Mirren, David Strathairn, Djimon Hounsou, Russell Brand, Felicity Jones, Alfred Molina, Ben Whishaw, Tom Conti, Reeve Carney, Chris Cooper, Alan Cumming	
D E C E M B E R	17	The Fighter	Paramount Pictures / Relativity Media / Mandeville Films	David O. Russell (director); Paul Attanasio, Lewis Colick (screenplay); Mark Wahlberg, Christian Bale, Amy Adams, Melissa Leo, Jack McGee, Frank Renzulli, Jenna Lamia, Bianca Hunter, Erica McDermott, Sugar Ray Leonard, Mickey O'Keefe, Kate O'Brien	
D E C E M B E R	17	How Do You Know	Columbia Pictures	James L. Brooks (director/screenplay); Reese Witherspoon, Paul Rudd, Owen Wilson, Jack Nicholson, Dean Norris, Kathryn Hahn, John Tormey, Yuki Matsuzaki, Andrew Wilson, Shelley Conn, Tony Shalhoub, Domenick Lombardozzi, Ron McLarty, Lenny Venito, Mark Linn-Baker, Molly Price	
D E C E M B E R	17	Tron: Legacy	Walt Disney Pictures	Joseph Kosinski (director); Edward Kitsis, Adam Horowitz (screenplay); Jeff Bridges, Garrett Hedlund, Olivia Wilde, Bruce Boxleitner, Michael Sheen, James Frain, Beau Garrett, Serinda Swan, Yaya DaCosta, Elizabeth Mathis, Jeffrey Nordling, Conrad Coates, Daft Punk, Steven Lisberger, Donnelly Rhodes, Belinda Montgomery, Dean Redman, Catherine Lough Haggquist, Brent Stait, Christine Adams, Jack McGee, John Reardon, Edie Mirman, Patrick Sabongui, Cillian Murphy	
D E C E M B E R	17	Yogi Bear	Warner Bros. Pictures	Eric Brevig (director); Brad Copeland, Joshua Sternin, Jeffrey Ventimilia (screenplay); Dan Aykroyd, Justin Timberlake, Anna Faris, Tom Cavanagh, T.J. Miller, Nate Corddry, Andrew Daly, Josh Robert Thompson, Isabella Acres, Kirk Baily, Shane Baumel, Emily Hahn, Luisa Leschin, Seth Morris, Raymond Ochoa, Michelle Ruff, Stephen Stanton	
D E C E M B E R	17	Rabbit Hole	Lionsgate	John Cameron Mitchell (director); David Lindsay-Abaire (screenplay); Nicole Kidman, Aaron Eckhart, Dianne Wiest, Sandra Oh, Miles Teller, Tammy Blanchard, Giancarlo Esposito, Jon Tenney, Stephen Mailer, Mike Doyle, Patricia Kalember, Deidre Goodwin, Rob Campbell	
D E C E M B E R	22	Little Fockers	Universal Pictures / Paramount Pictures / Relativity Media	Paul Weitz (director); John Hamburg, Larry Stuckey (screenplay); Robert De Niro, Ben Stiller, Owen Wilson, Blythe Danner, Teri Polo, Jessica Alba, Laura Dern, Harvey Keitel, Dustin Hoffman, Barbra Streisand, John DiMaggio, Yul Vazquez, Kevin Hart, Daisy Tahan, Olga Fonda, Tom McCarthy, Jordan Peele, Sergio Calderón, Colin Baiocchi	
D E C E M B E R	22	True Grit	Paramount Pictures / Skydance Productions / Mike Zoss Productions	Joel Coen, Ethan Coen (directors/screenplay); Jeff Bridges, Matt Damon, Josh Brolin, Hailee Steinfeld, Barry Pepper, Domhnall Gleeson, Ed Lee Corbin, Paul Rae, Nicholas Sadler, Dakin Matthews, Elizabeth Marvel, Leon Russom, Jarlath Conroy, J.K. Simmons, Bruce Green, Roy Lee Jones, Jake Walker, Don Pirl	
D E C E M B E R	22	Somewhere	Focus Features	Sofia Coppola (director/screenplay); Stephen Dorff, Elle Fanning, Benicio del Toro, Michelle Monaghan, Chris Pontius, Ellie Kemper, Lala Sloatman, Amanda Anka, Paul Greene, Eliza Coupe, Erin Wasson, Angela Lindvall, Maryna Linchuk, Kristina Shannon, Karissa Shannon, Aurélien Wiik, Lisa Lu, Alexander Nevsky, Emanuel Levy, Nicole Trunfio, Jo Champa, Laura Chiatti, Giorgia Surina, Simona Ventura, Nino Frassica, Maurizio Nichetti, Valeria Marini, Damián Delgado, Laura Ramsey, Alden Ehrenreich, Robert Schwartzman	
D E C E M B E R	22	Country Strong	Screen Gems	Shana Feste (director/screenplay); Gwyneth Paltrow, Tim McGraw, Garrett Hedlund, Leighton Meester, Marshall Chapman, Lari White, Jeremy Childs, Jim Lauderdale, Amanda Shires, Chris Scruggs	
D E C E M B E R	25	Gulliver's Travels	20th Century Fox / Dune Entertainment / Davis Entertainment	Rob Letterman (director); Joe Stillman, Nicholas Stoller (screenplay); Jack Black, Emily Blunt, Jason Segel, Catherine Tate, James Corden, Amanda Peet, Chris O'Dowd, Billy Connolly, T.J. Miller, Olly Alexander	
D E C E M B E R	29	Blue Valentine	The Weinstein Company	Derek Cianfrance (director/screenplay); Cami Delavigne, Joey Curtis (screenplay); Ryan Gosling, Michelle Williams, Mike Vogel, John Doman, Ben Shenkman, Maryann Plunkett, Faith Wladyka, Marshall Johnson, Jen Jones	

== See also ==
- List of 2010 box office number-one films in the United States
- 2010 in the United States
