= Our Sons =

1991 American television film

- Genre: Drama
- Based on: Too Little, Too Late (documentary) by Micki Dickoff
- Written by: William Hanley
- Directed by: John Erman
- Starring: Ann-Margret; Julie Andrews; Hugh Grant; Željko Ivanek; Tony Roberts
- Composer: John Morris
- Country of origin: United States
- Original language: English

Production
- Executive producers: William Hanley; Robert Greenwald; Carla Singer
- Producers: Micki Dickoff; Philip K. Kleinbart
- Production locations: Van Buren, Arkansas; Balboa Medical Center; Los Angeles
- Cinematography: Tony Imi
- Running time: 96 minutes
- Production company: Robert Greenwald Productions

Original release
- Network: ABC
- Release: May 19, 1991

Our Sons is a 1991 American made-for-television drama film starring Julie Andrews and Ann-Margret as two mothers of gay sons, one of whom is dying of AIDS. It was inspired by Micki Dickoff's 1987 documentary, Too Little, Too Late, about three families who had supported children with AIDS which had won an Emmy Award.

As it was a TV movie, "It's much safer to take the route of dealing with the two mothers" as the protagonists, said director John Erman.

It was broadcast the same day as GMHC's annual AIDS Walk in New York.

== Plot ==
In San Diego, California, Audrey Grant learns that her son James's partner, architect Donald Barnes, is dying of AIDS. Audrey and James have a strained relationship, partly because James believes his mother disapproves of his relationship with Donald. James spends most of his time caring for Donald in the hospital and refuses to be tested for HIV himself, despite Audrey's concerns. Donald has been estranged for years from his conservative and homophobic mother, Luanne Barnes, who lives in Fayetteville, Arkansas. Without Donald's knowledge, James asks Audrey to travel to Arkansas and convince Luanne to visit her dying son. Audrey flies to Little Rock and travels to Fayetteville, where she discovers that Luanne lives in a poor trailer park. Audrey informs her that Donald is dying, but Luanne initially reacts coldly, claiming she expected her son would eventually contract AIDS. Audrey conceals the romantic nature of Donald and James's relationship, describing them only as close friends, which further infuriates Luanne. After Audrey leaves, Luanne reconsiders and later agrees to travel to San Diego.

Because of a previous traumatic experience involving an airplane accident, Luanne insists on traveling by car at first. Audrey drives with her to Little Rock, and during the journey the two women discuss their relationships with their sons. Luanne reveals that she forced Donald out of the house when he was seventeen and has not seen him since, though she remains in contact with her two daughters. Audrey admits that James came out to her voluntarily, while Luanne says she discovered Donald's sexuality by accident. They eventually fly together to San Diego. Throughout the trip, Audrey and Luanne clash over their views on homosexuality. Audrey appears uncomfortable but largely accepting of James's sexuality, while Luanne openly condemns it and questions Audrey's attitude toward her son. After arriving in San Diego and staying at Audrey's home, tensions escalate into an argument, causing Luanne to leave during the night. Although she initially intends to return to Arkansas, she changes her mind and returns before her flight departs.

Donald is initially furious that James is bringing his mother from Arkansas, and admits that he is scared of her disapproval. Audrey and Luanne visit Donald in the hospital, where he reunites with his mother for the first time in years. Donald is pleased to see her but disappointed that she still fears physical contact because of misconceptions about AIDS. Luanne refuses to touch him and declines his offer of chocolates. Later, Audrey admits to Luanne that she barely knew Donald before his hospitalization and realizes that she would likely have made more of an effort to know him if he had been a woman. Audrey tells Luanne that she now better understands the difficulties faced by gay people and no longer sees James and Donald's relationship as different from any other. Audrey later meets James at a restaurant and confesses that she was devastated when he came out as gay and had hoped it was only a phase, though she never expressed those feelings openly. James says he was already aware of her discomfort. Audrey apologizes and tells him she now accepts him fully. She again urges him to be tested for HIV, and James admits that he is frightened of the possibility that he may also be infected.

Donald asks to spend his remaining days at the home he shares with James. Audrey and Luanne stay there as well. During this time, Luanne expresses her wish to return Donald's body to Arkansas after his death. She later visits Donald in his room and finally takes his hand, emotionally reconciling with him before he dies. After Donald's death, a memorial service is held in San Diego. His body is then flown to Arkansas for burial, with Luanne arranging the funeral in Fayetteville. After Luanne boards the plane with Donald's body, James discovers that she had preserved one of Donald's childhood drawings of a castle.

== Cast ==
- Ann-Margret as Luanne Barnes
- Julie Andrews as Audrey Grant
- Hugh Grant as James Grant
- Željko Ivanek as Donald Barnes
- Tony Roberts as Harry
- Hal England as Charley
- Loyda Ramos as Patient's Wife
- Annabelle Weenick as Nurse
- Lisa Blake Richards as Female Bar Patron
- Essex Smith as Trailer Park Manager
- Frank Whiteman as George
- Elizabeth Austin as Sally

== Reception ==
Ken Tucker of Entertainment Weekly magazine stated "Our Sons means well, and performances are above reproach. But it's also an infuriating piece of work that insults the intelligence of everyone invoked, especially its audience". He gave the movie a score of D.

"While the movie is too talky and not poignant enough to be great television, it rates high for integrity" is the opinion of David Hiltbrand of People. He also said that Julie Andrews brings "enormous dignity and clarity to her role".

Co-producer Micki Dickoff later stated "a father in Philadelphia was so moved by the television movie, he reconciled with his AIDS-stricken child".
