= Knights of Badassdom =

2013 American comedy-horror film directed by Joe Lynch

- Theatrical release poster
- Directed by: Joe Lynch
- Screenplay by: Kevin Dreyfuss; Matt Wall; Kurtis Long
- Produced by: Mark Burton; Matt Wall; Kevin Dreyfuss
- Starring: Steve Zahn; Ryan Kwanten; Summer Glau; Margarita Levieva; Jimmi Simpson; Peter Dinklage
- Cinematography: Sam McCurdy
- Edited by: Howard E. Smith
- Music by: Bear McCreary
- Production companies: IndieVest Pictures; Bayview Films
- Distributed by: Entertainment One
- Release dates: September 24, 2013 (ICon festival); January 21, 2014 (United States)
- Running time: 85 minutes
- Country: United States
- Language: English
- Box office: $123,854

Knights of Badassdom is a 2013 American comedy horror film, directed by Joe Lynch, written by Kevin Dreyfuss and Matt Wall. It stars Ryan Kwanten, Steve Zahn, Summer Glau, and Peter Dinklage.

== Plot ==
In a forest, a group of friends is participating in a LARP when their activities are brought to an end by abusive "paintballers". Their friend Joe Revitt, a slacker, aspiring rockstar, and a fan of metal music, is dumped by his girlfriend Beth. Joe's friends Eric and Hung bring him unwillingly to a fantasy LARP event to cheer him up. Game master Ronnie Kwok, who was once humiliated by Joe as a result of an embarrassing Dungeons & Dragons incident, demands that Eric cast an advanced regeneration spell to allow Joe into the game. Eric recites a random passage from a grimoire he ordered online to allow Joe into the game, and unknowingly summons a succubus which resembles Beth.

Hung teaches Joe the rules of LARP combat, and Joe begins bonding with a female LARPer named Gwen. She is accompanied by her brutish cousin Gunther, who believes that the LARP event is an actual fantasy world and that he is an actual warrior. After the LARP event begins, the succubus begins murdering LARPers, including Hung and their friend Lando, with Ronnie narrowly escaping. Joe, Eric, Gwen, and Gunther discover the aftermath of the killings, and Ronnie informs Eric that the spell he recited was a genuine Enochian spell that can summon demons. They are confronted by the succubus, and Eric recites a different spell to mortally wound the succubus but instead causes it to transform into a large monster.

The LARP battle of "Evermore" is accidentally started early, and the LARPers begin fighting. Amidst the combat, the LARPers are ambushed by the paintballers from much earlier, who proceed to shoot them, scaring some of them away, while others take a stand against them. To make matters worse, the succubus monster suddenly appears and slaughters many of the LARPers, including Ronnie, and the aforementioned paintballers, with Johnny, one of the assistant game masters being the only survivor, due to Gunther's timely arrival. Joe, Eric, and Gwen arrive to confront the beast, and they manage to pin it in place with the paintballers' truck. Joe, brandishing a mystical gem taken from the spine of the grimoire, sings a spell in a metal style, causing a spectral version of Hung to appear and defeat the monster. Six months later, Joe and Gwen are shown to have started a doom metal band, vowing to never LARP again, and that Joe has "gotten over" his breakup with Beth. In light of the monster's rampage, Gunther's belief that he is an actual warrior is reinforced. Ronnie was posthumously recognized as "game master extraordinaire", Eric is learning Enochian, becoming a "27th level sorcerer", and Hung's fight against the monster is now immortalized as legendary.

== Cast ==
- Ryan Kwanten as Joe Revitt
  - Brendan McCreary as Joe's singing voice
- Steve Zahn as Eric
- Peter Dinklage as Hung
- Summer Glau as Gwen
- Margarita Levieva as Beth / Succubus
- Jimmi Simpson as Ronnie Kwok
- Brett Gipson/Tom Hopper as Gunther
- Danny Pudi as Lando
- Michael Gladis as King Diamond
- Douglas Tait as Abominog
- Brian Posehn as Gilberto
- Khanh Doan as Andie
- Basil Harris/Dan Anderson as Eddie
- Dan Anderson as Johnny
- Joshua Malina as Travis
- Brandon Petty as Jake
- Kim Stodel as Ira

== Production ==
The film is directed by Joe Lynch and stars Peter Dinklage, Ryan Kwanten, Steve Zahn, and Summer Glau. Spectral Motion contributed the special effects in the film. The film was co-written by Kevin Dreyfuss and Matt Wall.

Filming began in July 2010 in and around Spokane, Washington. In September 2012, Wade Bradley of IndieVest reported that Knights of Badassdom was still in "post-production" and that the film was anticipated to be released theatrically in "the first half of 2013."

On March 4, 2013, updates reported that an edit of the film was screened on March 5, 2013, to potential buyers in Los Angeles.

On July 25, 2013, it was announced that Entertainment One had bought the North American distribution rights to the film with Wade Bradley negotiating the deal for IndieVest Pictures.

Some footage from the film and interviews with Douglas Tait are featured in the monster movie documentary Men in Suits.

The initial DVD and Blu-ray releases were in the United States on April 1, 2014. On February 9, 2015, the DVD was also released in the U.K.

As of March 2015, the film has been broadcast on Sky Movies in the U.K. and on Netflix in the United States.

== Reception ==
On review aggregator Rotten Tomatoes, the film holds an approval rating of 63% based on 16 reviews, with an average rating of 5.1/10. On Metacritic, the film has a weighted average score of 56 out of 100, based on four critics, indicating "mixed or average" reviews.

=== #ReleaseTheLynchCut campaign ===
Director Joe Lynch has since expressed disdain for the released version of the film and blamed the Media Society producers for removing the horror from the film, which inspired Twitter users calling for Lynch's cut, including Kevin Dreyfuss and Matt Wall through their shared Twitter account and is one of several anticipated horror director’s cuts according to Bloody Disgusting.
