= Life After Manson =

- Film poster
- Directed by: Olivia Klaus
- Produced by: Micki Dickoff, Ann-Caryn Cleveland, Kristen Irving, Olivia Klaus
- Starring: Patricia Krenwinkel; Charles Manson; Leslie Van Houten; Susan Atkins; Vincent Bugliosi
- Cinematography: Sunny Peabody, Clark Severson
- Edited by: Monique Zavistovski
- Music by: Luke Rothschild
- Distributed by: Women Make Movies, Network Ireland Television
- Release date: May 23, 2014 (Seattle)
- Running time: 25 minutes
- Country: United States
- Language: English

Life After Manson is a 2014 documentary film, and is based on the story of Manson Family member Patricia Krenwinkel, who was involved in the infamous Tate-LaBianca murders in 1969. In the documentary Krenwinkel discusses her childhood, her life with the family, and her life in prison. The film premiered at the 2014 Tribeca Film Festival.
