= Great Directors =

- Directed by: Angela Ismailos
- Written by: Angela Ismailos
- Cinematography: John Pirozzi
- Edited by: Christina Burchard; Sabine Hoffmann
- Music by: Joel Douek
- Production company: Anisma Films
- Distributed by: Paladin (II)
- Release dates: May 19, 2009 (Cannes); July 2, 2010 (United States)
- Running time: 90 minutes
- Country: United States
- Language: English
- Box office: $17,921

Great Directors is a 2009 documentary film which was written and directed by Angela Ismailos. In the film, Ismailos interviews directors of the late 20th and early 21st centuries, including Bernardo Bertolucci, Catherine Breillat, Liliana Cavani, Stephen Frears, Todd Haynes, Richard Linklater, Ken Loach, David Lynch, John Sayles, and Agnès Varda.

== Content ==
Filmmaker Angela Ismailos has conversations with 10 of the world's most known directors, soliciting their point of view about the creative process and the context of their work in the contemporary world. Among those interviewed are Bernardo Bertolucci, David Lynch, Stephen Frears, Agnès Varda, Ken Loach, Liliana Cavani, Todd Haynes, Catherine Breillat, Richard Linklater, and John Sayles, who traced the origins of their art to the influence of their predecessors—Lynch credits Fellini, and, for Haynes' outsider cinema, the work of Rainer Werner Fassbinder plays a role.

Great Directors was debuted at the 2009 Cannes Film Festival in May, and was released in New York City on July 2, 2010.

== Critical reception ==
On the review aggregator website Rotten Tomatoes, 66% of 38 critics' reviews are positive. The website's consensus reads: "Great Directors spreads itself too thin by focusing on 10 different filmmakers, but the thin overview still provides an intriguing primer for audiences who aren't already familiar with the profession." On Metacritic, the film has a rating score of 49 based on 10 critic reviews. The film received a number of mixed reviews. The idea of hearing important filmmakers talk about their works was praised, DVD Talk, stating for instance "everything flows together quite well as a smooth, enlightening, and privileged conversation about the meaning and making of cinema with people who know more about, and have more to say on, the subject than virtually anyone.everything flows together quite well as a smooth, enlightening, and privileged conversation about the meaning and making of cinema with people who know more about, and have more to say on, the subject than virtually anyone." but, according to The Guardian, "there's no coherent organisation, so Todd Haynes discusses Fassbinder, Richard Linklater critics, and Agnès Varda must come up with a response to such posers as: "Why are you known as the grandmother of the new wave?" You'd learn more just watching one of their films." The Los Angeles Times called the film a "vanity documentary"
