= IndieVest =

Defunct independent film studio

- Company type: Private
- Founded: Los Angeles, California 2004
- Defunct: July 2015
- Headquarters: Los Angeles, California
- Key people: Wade Bradley, Chairman/CEO
- Products: Independent Film Financing, Production, and Distribution
- Website: www.indievest.com

IndieVest, founded in 2004 by venture capitalist Wade Bradley, was an independent film studio, financier, and distributor based in Los Angeles. The company used a membership-based platform for financing film projects. The company served high-net-worth individuals and institutional investors. Following the failure of its only two films, several investors sued IndieVest and Bradley for fraud. The company went dormant in early 2012, and in July 2015, Bradley told investors that he had begun "winding down" IndieVest.

== Business plan ==
The company used a membership-based platform for financing film projects. The company served high-net-worth individuals and institutional investors. Members paid a fee of either $2,950 or $4,950 yearly along with a 10% syndication fee. Members were given film pitches to choose from, with a minimum investment of $50,000.

IndieVest documents promised investors a full return on investment, plus a preference payment of 15%. IndieVest stated that investors were to be paid out before the company profited.

== Film productions ==
IndieVest Pictures, a subsidiary of IndieVest, started production on their first film, Saint John of Las Vegas, in August 2008. The film is a buddy comedy featuring Steve Buscemi, Romany Malco, Sarah Silverman, and Tim Blake Nelson. Filming took place in New Mexico and Las Vegas. Saint John was released in January, 2010. The film received $21,666 in its opening weekend at #50 and reportedly the domestic box office receipts totaled just over $100,000. The film received mostly negative reviews, with a 17% rating with 6 "fresh" ratings and 30 "rotten" on Rotten Tomatoes. Chris Nashaway of Entertainment Weekly called the film "Excruciatingly awful" and "a shaggy road movie to nowhere".

In July 2010, IndieVest started filming a second movie, Knights of Badassdom, an American comedy horror film, directed by Joe Lynch, written by Kevin Dreyfuss and Matt Wall. The film was shelved and significantly re-cut by Bradley; Lynch later stated that this was a violation of their contract. On March 4, 2013 updates reported that the film was screened March 5, 2013 to potential buyers in Los Angeles. On July 25, 2013, it was announced that Entertainment One had bought the North American distribution rights to Knights of Badassdom with Wade Bradley negotiating the deal for IndieVest Pictures.

== Investor suits ==
On July 23, 2013, the Financial Industry Regulatory Authority (FINRA) settled a regulatory complaint against Wade Bradley, who provided a statement of mitigating circumstances and neither admitted nor denied the findings . The penalty was a thirty-day suspension associating with any FINRA-member organization, and a $7,500 fine (payable if he re-registers with a FINRA firm).

In 2013, several IndieVest investors launched an arbitration filing with FINRA against IndieVest and Bradley seeking $1.6 million to be returned to them. The investors alleged that Bradley illegitimately withdrew their funds from escrow despite the fact that the minimum amount had not been reached to break escrow. Bradley stated that he had believed that the minimum amount had been reached at the time he withdrew the funds. The investors alleged that Bradley's company Media Society, founded in late 2012 about seven months after IndieVest became dormant, was a successor entity that should have borne IndieVest's liabilities. Bradley responded that Media Society was a separate entity and not connected to IndieVest.

In fall 2013, Comen VFX, a visual effects company, was awarded $119,649 in an arbitration judgement against IndieVest, after it was found that IndieVest had not paid for work performed on Knights.
