= Micki Dickoff =

- Occupations: Director; Writer; Producer

Micki Dickoff is an American director, writer and producer of social justice films. Her documentary Neshoba: The Price of Freedom opened theatrically in New York and Los Angeles, winning a number of Best Documentary and Special Jury Awards in film festivals. Neshoba was one of three finalists for the Humanitas Prize and selected to participate in the American Documentary Showcase in Kenya. Dickoff's film, The Gathering, profiles exonerated death row survivors who become advocates against the death penalty. The film premiered at the French Embassy in Washington, D.C., presented by the EU Delegation to the United States and won Best Short Documentary at the Fort Lauderdale International Film Festival. Her new film, The Legacy, focuses on generational poverty and children at risk.

Dickoff was raised and educated in New York and Florida and received her master's degree from the University of Florida where she was named an alumna of distinction in 1993. After graduate school, she moved to Boston and taught filmmaking at Grahm Junior College and Emerson College for more than a decade. After winning an Emmy Award for her AIDS documentary Too Little, Too Late, she went to Los Angeles to make films about AIDS and other social issues.

Dickoff was selected for the Directing Workshop for Women at the American Film Institute where she developed her multi-award-winning AIDS drama, Mother, Mother. The film was funded in part by actors Bess Armstrong, Polly Bergen, Piper Laurie and John Dye, and composer Henry Mancini. Singer-songwriter Cris Williamson wrote the title song. Too Little, Too Late and Mother, Mother inspired Our Sons, a television movie Dickoff co-produced about AIDS and families starring Julie Andrews, Ann-Margret and Hugh Grant; the film won a Peabody Award.

Dickoff produced and directed, In the Blink of an Eye, a television movie about the death penalty and the power of friendship, starring Mimi Rogers, Veronica Hamel, Polly Bergen, Piper Laurie, Jeffrey Dean Morgan and Denise Richards. She directed and produced Bush's Deadly Ambition, a news feature for British television about the wrongful execution of Gary Graham (Shaka Sankofa) and presidential politics. Dickoff produced Life After Manson: The Untold Story of Patricia Krenwinkel, about what led Manson follower Patricia Krenwinkel to participate in the murders. The short documentary premiered at the 2014 Tribeca Film Festival in New York City.

Dickoff heads Pro Bono Productions where she continues to develop and produce documentary and narrative films. She is a member of the Directors Guild of America (DGA) and the Independent Documentary Association (IDA).

== Films ==
- The Legacy (in post production)
- The Gathering
- In the Blink of an Eye
- Mother, Mother
- Neshoba: The Price of Freedom
- Get on Board
- Bush's Deadly Ambition
- Justice on Trial: The Case of Gary Graham
- Step By Step: A Journey of Hope
- Not in my Name
- Our Sons
- Something About The Women
- Goldbeating: The Making of Gold Leaf
- Food For Thought
- Show Me A Story
- Too Little, Too Late
- It's Never Too Late: A Portrait of Buffy
- Monday Morning Pronouns
- Life After Manson
- African Airlift (PSA)
- Rosie's Place (PSA)
