= Hélène Cardona =

French-American poet

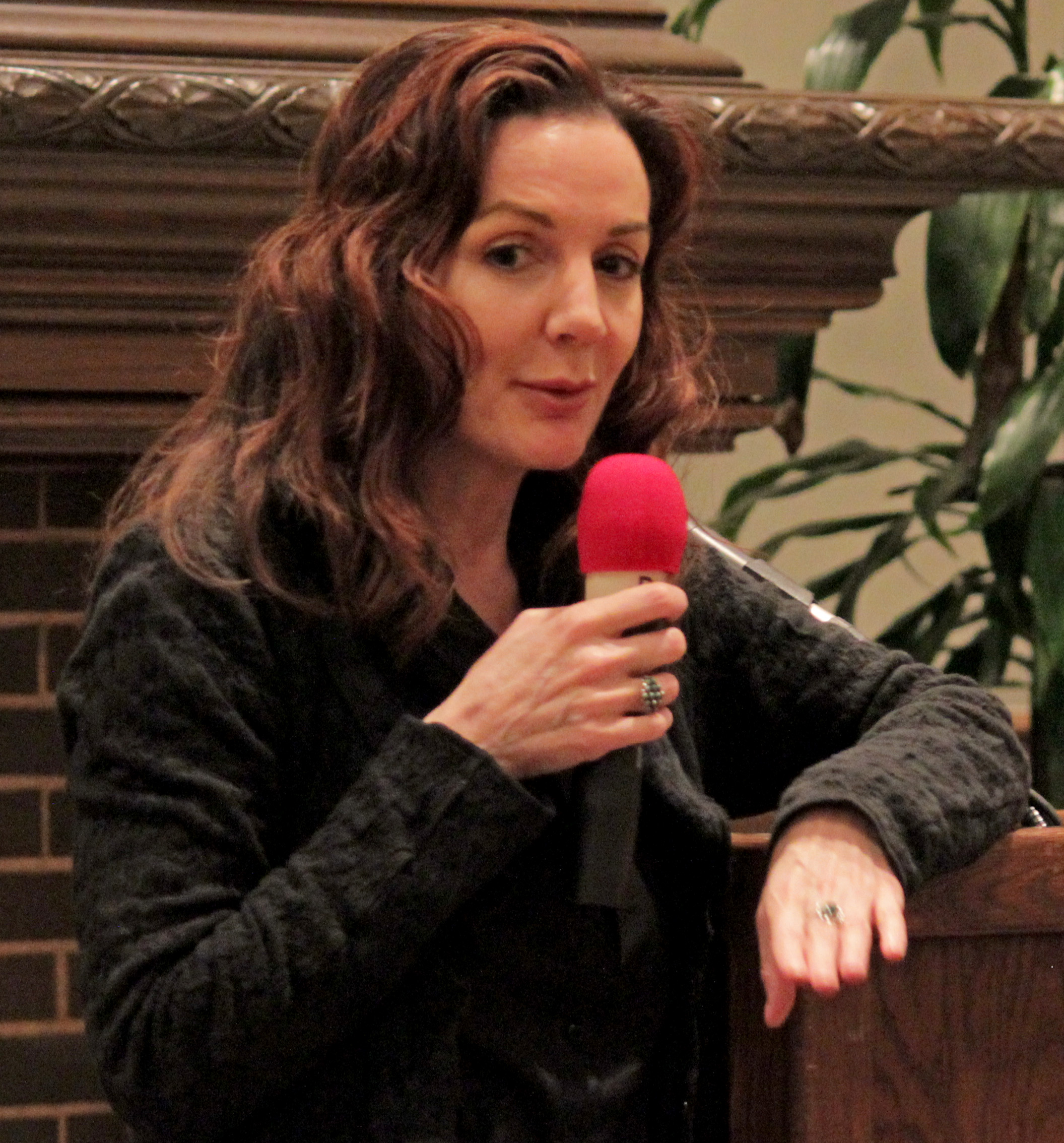
Cardona at 2014 Puterbaugh Festival

Hélène Cardona is a French poet, linguist, literary translator and actor. She was born in Paris, the daughter of Spanish poet Jose Manuel Cardona, from Ibiza, and a Greek mother. She is a citizen of France, Spain, and the United States.

== Biography ==
She studied in the University of Cantabria, Spain and in the Sorbonne in Paris, gaining a master's degree in American Literature. She has received fellowships from the Goethe-Institut and the International University of Andalucía.

Cardona has worked as a translator for the French Chamber of Commerce, the Canadian Embassy, and for the film industry. her book Life in Suspension won the 2017 International Book Award in Poetry.

She played the part of Françoise "Fuffi" Drou, the beauty shop proprietor in the film Chocolat.

== Works ==
She is author of:

- Dreaming My Animal Selves (Bilingual English/French)
- The Astonished Universe/ L'Univers Stupefait
- Life in Suspension

She has translated:

- José Manuel Cardona's Birnam Wood/ El Bosque de Birnam (Bilingual English/Spanish)
- Gabriel Arnou-Laujeac's Beyond Elsewhere
- Dorianne Laux's Ce que nous portons
- Walt Whitman's Civil War Writings (Whitman et la Guerre de Sécession)
