= Kathryn Kirkpatrick =

Kathryn Kirkpatrick (born Columbia, South Carolina in 1957) is a poet, scholar, and English professor at Appalachian State University. Her works of poetry focus on the natural world and the ways humans interact with nature, and the ethical treatment of animals. As an academic, she also specializes in Irish literature and culture, which is a common theme in her published works. She has received several awards for her poetry collections.

== Education ==
Born into a military family, Kirkpatrick grew up in the Philippines, Texas, Germany, and the Carolinas. She received her B.A. in English from Winthrop University, her M.A. in English from University of North Carolina at Chapel Hill, and her Ph.D. in Theories of Interpretation from Emory University.

== Career ==
Her works include seven poetry collections: The Body's Horizon (1996), Beyond Reason (2004), Out of the Garden (2007), Unaccountable Weather (2011), Our Held Animal Breath (2012), Her Small Hands Were Not Beautiful (2014), and The Fisher Queen: New & Selected Poems (2019). She has also written two chapbooks entitled Looking for Ceilidh and The Master's Wife. Kirkpatrick places great emphasis on the ethical treatment of animals and explores the ways in which these issues overlap with human societal and cultural conflict.

Her poetry has been featured in a number of anthologies and other publications, including Facing the Change: Personal Encounters with Global Warming; Animal Companions, Animal Doctors, Animal People; Cadence of Hooves: A Celebration of Horses; The Carol Adams Reader; Don't Leave Hungry: Fifty Years of Southern Poetry Review; and Poetry from Sojourner: A Feminist Anthology. Her academic essays have been published in New Hibernia Review; Eire-Ireland; An Sionnach; Canadian Journal of Irish Studies; and Irish University Review.

Kirkpatrick has explored feminist and ecofeminist themes within her works, as well as societal perceptions of womanhood as women age. Kirkpatrick is a breast cancer survivor and writes about her experience in her 2011 poetry collection, Unaccountable Weather.

She is an English professor at Appalachian State University. Her profile on the university's English Department webpage lists her specialties as poetry and poetics, Irish literature and culture, ecocriticism and ecofeminism, and animal studies.

== Writings ==
=== Poetry ===
- The Body's Horizon, Signal Books, 1996, ISBN 978-0930095031
- Beyond Reason, Pecan Grove Press, 2004, ISBN 978-1931247092
- Out of the Garden, Mayapple Press, 2007, ISBN 978-0932412515
- Unaccountable Weather, Press 53, 2011, ISBN 978-1-935708-37-7
- Our Held Animal Breath, WordTech Editions, 2012, ISBN 978-1936370917
- Her Small Hands Were Not Beautiful, Clemson University Press, 2014, ISBN 978-0989082631
- “what happened next, happened fast.” North Carolina Literary Review. Iss. 26 (2017).
- The Fisher Queen: New & Selected Poems, Salmon Poetry, 2019, ISBN 978-1-912561-45-2

=== Chapbooks ===
- Looking for Ceilidh, 2004
- The Master's Wife, 2004

=== Scholarly essays ===
This is a non-exhaustive list.

- "'Gentlemen Have Horrors Upon This Subject': West Indian Suitors in Maria Edgeworth's Belinda. Eighteenth-Century Fiction: Vol. 5: Iss. 4, Article 3. pp. 331-348.
- "Sermons and Strictures: Conduct-Book Propriety and Property Relations In Late Eighteenth-Century England". History, Gender & Eighteenth-Century Literature. University of Georgia Press (1994). pp. 198-226.
- "Putting Down the Rebellion: Notes and Glosses on Castle Rackrent". Éire-Ireland. Irish American Cultural Institute (1994). pp. 77-90.
- "Going to Law About that Jointure: Women and Property in Castle Rackrent". The Canadian Journal of Irish Studies: Vol. 22: Number 1. 1996. pp. 21-29.
- "The Limits of Liberal Feminism in Maria Edgeworth's Belinda". Jane Austen and Mary Shelley and Their Sisters. University Press of America (2000). pp. 73-82.
- "'Between Breath and No Breath': Witnessing Class Trauma in Paula Meehan's Dharmakaya. An Sionnach: A Journal of Literature, Culture, and the Arts. Creighton University Press (2004). pp. 47-64.
- "'A Murmuration of Starlings in a Rowan Tree': Finding Gary Snyder in Paula Meehan's Eco-Political Poetics". An Sionnach: A Journal of Literature, Culture, and the Arts: Vol. 5: Numbers 1 & 2. pp. 195-207.
- "Paula Meehan's Gardens". New Hibernia Review: Vol. 17: Number 2. pp. 45-61.
- "Between Country and City: Paula Meehan's Ecofeminist Poetics". Out of the Earth: Ecocritical readings of Irish texts. Cork University Press (2010). pp. 108-126.
- “Strand Sonnets.” Facing the Change: Personal Encounters with Global Warming. Ed. Steven Pavlos Holmes. Salt Lake City, Utah: Torrey House Press. 2013.
- "'Old Maedhe, Dagda, and the Sidhe: Maud Gonne's Menagerie'". Representing the Modern Animal in Culture. Palgrave Macmillan (2014). pp. 59-79.
- "Quick, Red Foxes: Irish Women Write the Hunt". Animals in Irish Literature and Culture. 2015. pp. 26-41.
- "Othering the Animal, Othering the Nation". Animals in Irish Literature and Culture. 2015. pp. 1-10.
- “Calf.” The Carol Adams Reader. London: Bloomsbury, 2016.
- "Memory in Paula Meehan's Geomantic". Irish University Review: Vol. 47.1. 2017. pp. 10-14.
- "Vegans in Locavore Literature". Through a Vegan Studies Lens: Textual Ethics and Lived Activism. 2019. pp. 1-16.
- "Ecofeminist Embodiment in the Anthropocene". 2020.

=== Editorial works ===
- Belinda (Oxford World's Classics), by Maria Edgeworth, 1994, ISBN 978-0192831231
- Border Crossings: Irish Women Writers and National Identities, 2000, ISBN 978-0817309961
- The Wild Irish Girl: A National Tale (Oxford World's Classics), 2008, ISBN 978-0199552498
- Castle Rackrent (Oxford World's Classics), by Maria Edgeworth, 2009, ISBN 978-0199537556
- Animals in Irish Literature and Culture, 2015, ISBN 978-1-137-43480-7

== Awards and honors ==
She was awarded the N.C. Poetry Society's Brockman-Campbell Award for her poetry collections, The Body's Horizon (1997), Our Held Animal Breath (2013), and Her Small Hands Were Not Beautiful (2015). The North Carolina Literary and Historical Association awarded her with the Roanoke-Chowan Poetry Prize for her poetry collections, Beyond Reason (2004) and The Fisher Queen (2019). Her book, Out of the Garden (2007), was a finalist for the Southern Independent Booksellers Association poetry award.
