= Neshoba (film) =

2008 film by Micki Dickoff

Neshoba: The Price of Freedom
- Film poster
- Directed by: Micki Dickoff; Tony Pagano
- Written by: Micki Dickoff
- Produced by: Micki Dickoff; Tony Pagano
- Release date: October 2008 (Indie Memphis)
- Country: United States
- Language: English

Neshoba: The Price of Freedom is a 2008 documentary film about events and attitudes in Neshoba County, Mississippi, especially the 1964 murders of Chaney, Goodman, and Schwerner. The film premiered at the 2008 Indie Memphis Film Festival, where it won the Jury Award for Best Documentary.

== Synopsis ==
Neshoba explores the history and changing racial attitudes of Neshoba County, Mississippi four decades after the murders of James Chaney, Andrew Goodman, and Michael Schwerner during Freedom Summer. The film captures the trial of Edgar Ray Killen, who granted the filmmakers "extraordinary access".

== Awards ==
- Best Documentary – Boston Film Festival
- Best Political Documentary & Best Directors – New York International Independent Film and Video Festival
- Best Documentary – Indie Memphis Film Festival
- Best Documentary – Ft. Lauderdale International Film Festival
- Best Mississippi Film – Oxford Film Festival
- Best Overall Film – Texas Black Film Festival
- Best Documentary – Texas Black Film Festival
- Best Human Rights Film – Canada International Film Festival
- Best Documentary – Teaneck International Film Festival
- Best Film – Berlin Black International Film Festival
- Special Jury Award – WorldFest-Houston International Film Festival
- Special Jury Award – Monaco Film Festival
- Audience Award – Albuquerque Film Festival
- Humanitas Prize Nominee
- American Documentary Showcase – Kenya International Film Festival

== Reception ==
Though critical of certain production elements, Variety praised Neshoba as "a disturbing peek at how little some people have changed, as well as an inspiring portrait of others' determination to see crime punished at last".

On the review aggregator website Rotten Tomatoes, the film holds an approval rating of 88%, based on 16 reviews, with an average rating of 7.5/10.

== See also ==
- Civil rights movement in popular culture
