= Saint John of Las Vegas =

- Theatrical release poster
- Directed by: Hue Rhodes
- Screenplay by: Hue Rhodes
- Story by: Dante Alighieri
- Produced by: Mark Burton; Matt Wall; Spike Lee; Steve Buscemi; Stanley Tucci
- Starring: Steve Buscemi; Romany Malco; Sarah Silverman; Peter Dinklage; Tim Blake Nelson
- Cinematography: Giles Nuttgens
- Edited by: Annette Davey
- Music by: David Torn
- Production company: Circle of Confusion
- Distributed by: IndieVest Pictures
- Release dates: June 10, 2009 (CineVegas); January 29, 2010 (United States)
- Running time: 85 minutes
- Country: United States
- Language: English
- Budget: $2 million
- Box office: $102,647

Saint John of Las Vegas is a 2009 American comedy-drama film starring Steve Buscemi, Romany Malco, and Sarah Silverman.

St. John of Las Vegas was the first film released by IndieVest Pictures, a subsidiary of IndieVest.

The film, directed and written for the screen by Hue Rhodes (based on a story by Dante Alighieri) and produced by Steve Buscemi, Stanley Tucci, and Spike Lee, follows an ex-gambler as he takes a road trip with his new partner, an auto insurance fraud debunker, to investigate a fraud, while meeting a series of offbeat characters, including a carnival's human torch, a paraplegic stripper, and a nude militant, along the way.

The film was shown in film festivals and was released in limited release on January 29, 2010.

== Plot ==
A compulsive gambler attempts to cure his addiction by moving from Las Vegas to Albuquerque and working at an auto insurance company, only to find old temptations cropping up once again when he's sent out to investigate a dubious car accident just outside Sin City.

After a string of bad luck at the tables, John (Steve Buscemi) decides to give up gambling and take a shot at a "normal" life. Arriving in Albuquerque and landing a job at an auto insurance company, John goes to work for Mr. Townsend (Peter Dinklage), who pairs him with the company's top fraud debunker, Virgil (Romany Malco), and sends them out on an investigation together. While John is eager to get a promotion, he's reluctant to go anywhere near Las Vegas, and before he leaves he strikes up a tenuous romance with his eccentric co-worker, Jill (Sarah Silverman).

On the road, Virgil and John encounter a series of offbeat characters including Ned, a nude militant (Tim Blake Nelson), Tasty D Lite, a wheelchair-using stripper (Emmanuelle Chriqui), and a carnival human torch (John Cho). But while Virgil is the one with the experience, John gradually begins to assert himself and soon his efforts begin to pay off as the case moves closer to conclusion. As John's confidence grows, he becomes increasingly aware of the fact that running away from his gambling problem is not the solution, and that he'll only be able to move forward by returning to Las Vegas to face his demons head on.

== Cast ==
- Steve Buscemi as John, a quitting gambler
- Romany Malco as Virgil, an insurance fraud investigator
- Sarah Silverman as Jill, John's co-worker and love interest
- Peter Dinklage as Mr. Townsend, John's boss
- Tim Blake Nelson as Ned, a nude militant
- Danny Trejo as Bismarck
- John Cho as Smitty, a carnival human torch
- Emmanuelle Chriqui as "Tasty D Lite", a paraplegic stripper
- Aviva Farber as Penny
- Isaac Kappy as Geek

== Release and reception ==
The film received $21,666 in its opening weekend at #50 and reportedly gross domestic box office receipts totaled just over $100,000.

The film received mostly negative reviews. The film holds a 23% approval rating on Rotten Tomatoes, based on 52 reviews. The website's critics' consensus reads: "Writer-director Hue Rhodes' debut is a poorly-paced, forgettable comedy that wastes the quirky talents of stars Steve Buscemi and Sarah Silverman."

Initially, critics panned the film. Chris Nashaway of Entertainment Weekly called the film "Excruciatingly awful" and "a shaggy road movie to nowhere". Roger Ebert of RogerEbert.com wrote "This movie is all elbows. Nothing fits. It doesn't add up. It has some terrific free-standing scenes, but they need more to lean on."

More recent reviews are slightly more positive. In 2016 Perri Nemiroff published a review in CinemaBlend that said "It’s far from a masterpiece, but Hue Rhodes manages to do Buscemi justice providing him with a character ripe with emotion and a fascinating complexity. Buscemi returns the favor by powering the film with an engaging oddity."

In 2020, Mike Massie rated it 7/10 on Rotten Tomatoes describing it as "a surrealistic fable of one man's descent into hell through a supreme loss of luck and a little trickery from unsavory denizens of the underworld."
