= Hunting Season =

Hunting Season may refer to:

- The Hunting Season, the Haganah's suppression of the Irgun's insurgency against the government of the British Mandate in Palestine
- Hunting season, the time when it is legal to hunt and kill a particular species of animal
- Hunting Season (2010 film), a 2010 Turkish film
- Hunting Season (2017 film), a 2017 Argentine film
- Hunting Season (2025 film), a 2025 American film
- Hunting Season (web series), a 2012 American web-series
- "Hunting Season" (Due South), a 1999 television episode
