= Adam Kane =

American cinematographer & television director

- Education: AFI Conservatory
- Occupations: Cinematographer, television director, television producer
- Years active: 1989–present
- Spouse: Leslie Hope (m. 2005; div. 2015)

Adam Kane is an American cinematographer, film director, television director and producer.

Since the 1990s, Kane has cinematography credits for the films Hail Caesar, The Boondock Saints, The Man, and Skinwalkers.

In 2005, he transitioned to directing, starting with the short film The Fix starring Robert Patrick. As a television director, his credits include Pushing Daisies, My Own Worst Enemy, Supernatural, Kings, Mercy, Heroes, The Mentalist, Haven, Being Human, Hannibal, 24: Live Another Day, Daredevil, Supergirl, and Star Trek: Discovery. In 2009, Kane directed the film Formosa Betrayed starring James Van Der Beek.

He is an alumnus of New York University's Tisch School of the Arts and the AFI Conservatory. He was married to actress Leslie Hope.
