= The Real Full Monty (American TV special) =

2024 TV special

- Directed by: Sam Wrench
- Presented by: Anthony Anderson; Mandy Moore
- Starring: Anthony Anderson; Taye Diggs; Chris Jones; Tyler Posey; Bruno Tonioli; James Van Der Beek
- Country of origin: United States
- Original language: English

Production
- Executive producers: Anthony Anderson; Dan Norris; Ashley Edens; Nick Bullen; Daniela Neumann
- Producer: Connor Malbeuf
- Production companies: Spun Gold TV; FOX Alternative Entertainment

Original release
- Network: Fox
- Release: December 9, 2024

The Real Full Monty is a television special that premiered on December 9, 2024, on Fox. The special was hosted by Anthony Anderson and was based on the British television specials of the same name. The special featured six male celebrities stripping to raise money for cancer charities. Mandy Moore appeared to coach the celebrities and choreograph.

== Production ==
On March 4, 2024, Fox ordered the special. On May 13, 2024, the six male contestants were announced. On September 5, 2024, it was announced that the special would premiere on December 9, 2024. On February 18, 2026, Fox reaired the special following the death of contestant James Van Der Beek from colorectal cancer on February 11. During the broadcast, a QR code was displayed to encourage viewers to donate to the Colorectal Cancer Alliance.

== Contestants ==
Celebrity	Known for
Anthony Anderson	Actor/comedian
Bruno Tonioli	Choreographer/Dancing with the Stars judge
Chris Jones	NFL player
James Van Der Beek	Actor
Taye Diggs	Actor
Tyler Posey	Actor/musician

- Dwight Howard was supposed to join but he decided to withdraw.
- Don Cheadle, Joel McHale, and Mario Lopez make cameo appearances.
