= Sofia Hublitz =

American actress (born 2000)

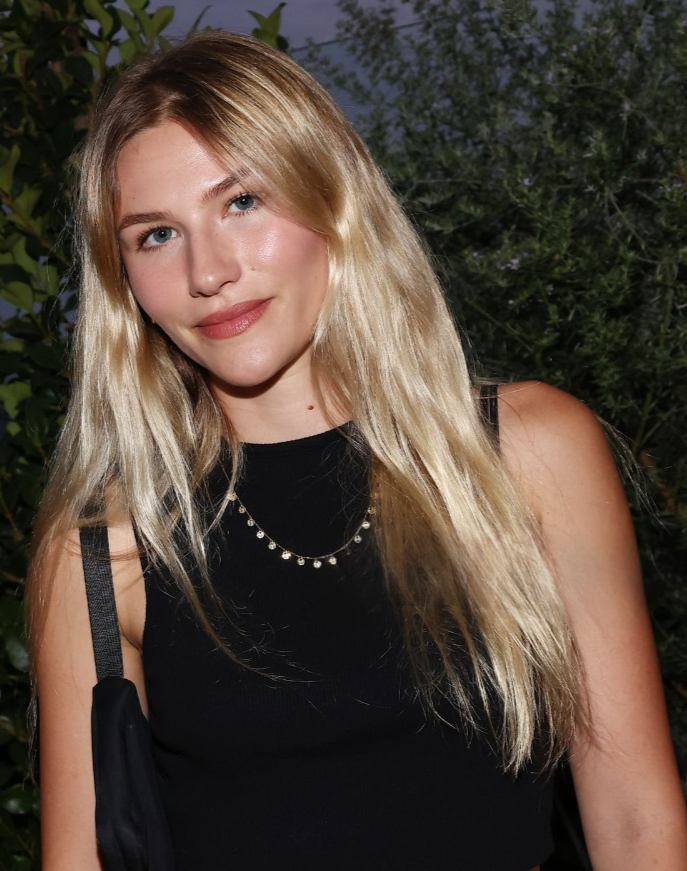
- Hublitz in 2023
- Born: June 1, 2000 (age 26); Richmond, Virginia, U.S.
- Occupation: Actress
- Years active: 2013–present

Sofia Hublitz (born June 1, 2000) is an American actress. She is best known for her role as Charlotte Byrde in the Netflix crime drama series Ozark (2017–2022).

== Early life ==
Hublitz was born in Richmond, Virginia, on June 1, 2000. Due to her mother Sosie Hublitz's work as a screen art director, she became familiar with film production from an early age. The family moved to New York City in 2007, when she was seven years old.

== Career ==
Hublitz first appeared on TV as a contestant on MasterChef Junior in 2013. At one point, she was seen crying over a mistake she had made during one of the tasks, with Gordon Ramsay comforting her and assisting her in redoing the task. The following year, she landed her first acting role as Danielle Hoffman in two episodes of Louis C.K.'s television series Louie, and a young Sylvia in an episode of Horace and Pete in 2016. From 2017 to 2022, she starred as Charlotte Byrde in the Netflix series Ozark. She is set to appear in I Let You In, a virtual reality 6-episode series based on the Talk to Me universe, which is set to debut on Meta Platforms in 2027.

== Filmography ==
=== Film ===
Year	Title	Role	Notes
2020	What Breaks the Ice	Sammy	
2021	Ida Red	Darla Walker	
2025	Hunting Season	Tag	
2026	The Gates	Roxy	

=== Television ===
Year	Title	Role	Notes
2013	MasterChef Junior	Self (contestant)	7 episodes
2014	Louie	Danielle Hoffman	2 episodes
2016	Horace and Pete	Young Sylvia	Episode #1.10
2017–2022	Ozark	Charlotte Byrde	Main role; 43 episodes
2025	Good American Family	Young Kristine Barnett	Guest; 1 Episode

=== Virtual reality series ===
Year	Title	Role	Notes
2027	I Let You In	TBA	Post-production

== Awards and nominations ==
Year	Award	Category	Work	Result	Ref.
2019	Screen Actors Guild Awards	Outstanding Performance by an Ensemble in a Drama Series (shared)	Ozark	Nominated	
2021	Screen Actors Guild Awards	Outstanding Performance by an Ensemble in a Drama Series (shared)	Ozark	Nominated	
2023	Screen Actors Guild Awards	Outstanding Performance by an Ensemble in a Drama Series (shared)	Ozark	Nominated	
