= Will Tiao =

American actor

- Chinese: 刁毓能
- Born: October 31, 1973 (age 52); Manhattan, Kansas
- Education: Tufts University (BA); Columbia University (MA)
- Occupations: Actor, producer, realtor, and businessman

Will Tiao (born October 31, 1973) is a Taiwanese-American actor, producer, and real estate broker, developer and investor.

== Early life and education ==
Tiao was born and raised in Manhattan, Kansas. Tiao graduated from Manhattan High School.

Tiao majored in cello performance at the University of Michigan School of Music, Theatre & Dance before transferring to Tufts University, where he received a B.A. in international relations magna cum laude and studied EU politics and economy at Sciences Po as a foreign exchange student in France. Tiao then earned a M.A. in international affairs from Columbia University School of International and Public Affairs and received a Fulbright Scholarship from De La Salle University for his research on ASEAN.

== Career ==
Tiao worked for Senate Committee on Foreign Relations, U.S. Department of Labor and House Committee on Ways and Means. He was a Presidential Management Fellow under the Clinton administration and went on to become an international economist under the George W. Bush administration. However, after having spent a decade in international politics on the East Coast and abroad, Tiao decided to leave politics and came to Los Angeles to pursue a career in entertainment.

In 2002, Tiao's entertainment career began as an actor in Sex and the City. In 2005, Tiao became a writer and producer in A Starbucks Story. Tiao has worked as an actor, producer, and writer/translator for TV, film, and stage. His TV credits include MADtv (FOX), Yes, Dear (CBS), Untold Stories from the ER (TLC), Mind of Mencia (Comedy Central), The Winner (FOX), and the internet series Quarterlife. His theatre credits include Waiting for Lefty, Extremities, Marty, In the Boom Boom Room, and Proof. He starred in and produced the award-winning short film "A Starbucks Story" as well as the independent dark comedy "Stan." He is the writer, actor, and producer of Formosa Betrayed, a feature film based on the true events surrounding Taiwanese democracy and independence activists in the 1980s.

He is the owner of Tiao Properties, a real estate and property management company in Los Angeles.

== Filmography ==
=== Film ===
- 2005 A Starbucks Story - Carl. Screenwriter. Executive producer. Short film.
- 2006 Asian Stories - Casting director.
- 2007 The Third Nail - Store clerk.
- 2009 Formosa Betrayed - Ming. Writer. Producer.
- 2011 Stan - Raul. Producer.

=== Television series ===
- 2002 Sex and the City - Bookstore Patron. The Big Journey (Season 5. Episode 7).
