= Leslie Hope =

Canadian actress and director (born 1965)

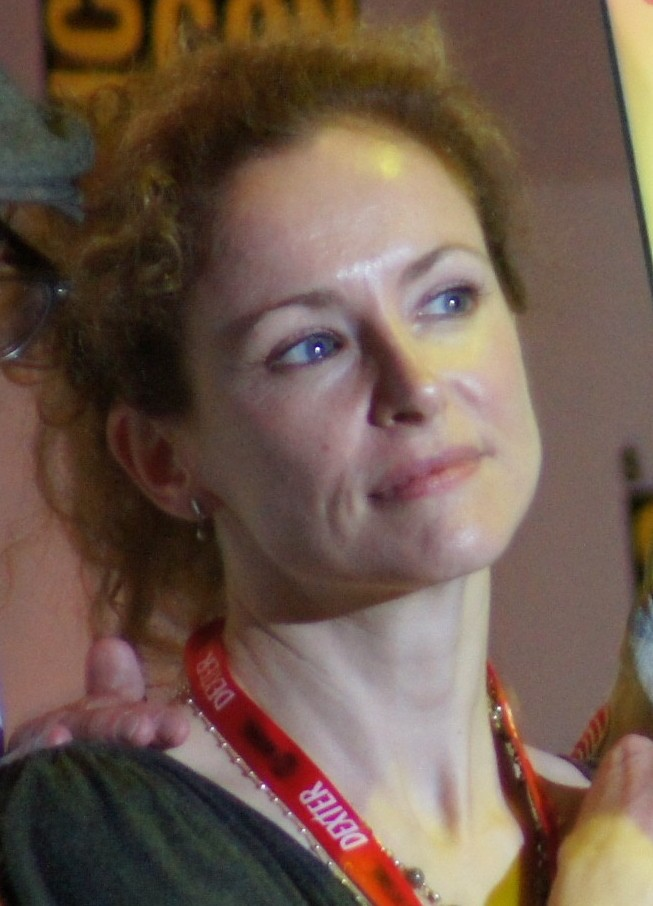
- Hope at the 2011 San Diego Comic-Con
- Born: May 6, 1965 (age 61); Halifax, Nova Scotia, Canada
- Occupations: Actress, director
- Years active: 1981–present
- Spouses: Jamie Angell (m. 1994; div. 1996); Adam Kane (m. 2005; div. 2015)
- Children: 1

Leslie Hope is a Canadian actress and director, best known for her role as Teri Bauer on the Fox television series 24 and prosecutor Anita Gibbs on Suits. Other credits include Shadow Builder (1998), Murdoch Mysteries, The Strain (2015), Lost in Space (2019–2021), Snowpiercer (2021–22), Devil in Ohio (2022).

== Early life ==
Hope was born in Halifax, Nova Scotia, on May 6, 1965, to Ann and Frank Hope. She has one brother, Stephen. She graduated from St. Michael's University School at Victoria, British Columbia in 1982. Hope was married to writer and actor Jamie Angell from 1994 to 1996, with whom she has a son named MacKenzie, and to cinematographer, producer, and director Adam Kane from 2005 to 2015.

== Career ==
Hope has appeared in many Canadian and American films and television series. Her first film role was in the Canadian film Ups and Downs, which was filmed in Victoria, in 1981. In 1982, she worked as a crew member for, and had a bit part in, Love Streams.

On television, in 1985, Hope portrayed Cammie Springer in Berrenger's. In 1987, she played the role of Madeleine Henry in the TV miniseries War and Remembrance. In 1993, she starred in Paris, France, directed by Gerard Ciccoritti. In 1998, she played Jenny Hatcher in the Bram Stoker' film Shadow Builder.

In 2002, she landed the role as Teri Bauer in the first season of 24 (2001–02). Hope starred in George A. Romero's film Bruiser. On television, she appeared in Star Trek: Deep Space Nine, as Kira Nerys' mother Kira Meru and in the Gemini Award-winning series Human Cargo.

In 2003–04, Hope portrayed agent Lisa Cohen on Line of Fire. In 2005–06, she appeared as Attorney General of the United States Melanie Blackston in four episodes of Commander in Chief, and, in the fall of 2006, played Lily Rader in the CW drama series, Runaway. In 2009, she played a detective on Seven Deadly Sins, a miniseries on Lifetime.

In 2014, Hope played attorney Joan Luss, a surviving passenger of Regis Airlines Flight 753, on FX's The Strain. She also has recurring roles in the crime series NCIS, as Secretary of the Navy Sarah Porter. She was in the legal drama Suits, as prosecutor Anita Gibbs. She portrayed the role of a psychic medium Kristina Frye in the television crime drama The Mentalist.

== Filmography ==
=== Film ===
Year	Title	role	Notes
1981	Ups and Downs	Penelope	
1984	Love Streams	Joanie	
1986	Education of Allison	Allison Tate	
1988	Kansas	Lori Bayles	
1988	It Takes Two	Stephanie Lawrence	
1988	Talk Radio	Laura	
1990	Men at Work	Susan Wilkins	
1991	The Big Slice	Jenny Colter	
1991	True Confections	Verna Miller	
1992	The Dance Goes On	Rick's Girl in LA	
1993	Doppelganger	Elizabeth	
1993	Sweet Killing	Eva Bishop	
1993	Paris, France	Lucy	
1994	Boozecan	Helen	
1994	Fun	Jane	
1994	Schemes	Laura Steele	Video
1994	Cityscrapes: Los Angeles	Katie	
1995	First Degree	Hadley Pyne	Video
1996	The Conspiracy of Fear	Jimmy	Video
1996	Rowing Through	Kate Bordeleau	
1998	Shadow Builder	Jenny Hatcher	
1998	Summer of the Monkeys	Sarah Lee	
1999	Water Damage	Arabella Bauer	
1999	The Life Before This	Alice	
2000	Double Frame	Special Agent Kate Olsen	
2000	Bruiser	Rosemary Newley	
2000	The Spreading Ground	Leslie DeLongpre	
2002	Dragonfly	Charisse Darrow	
2005	The Fix	Leslie	Short film
2008	Never Back Down	Margot Tyler	
2009	Formosa Betrayed	Lisa Gilbert	
2012	Mindfield	Maggie	Short film
2015	Crimson Peak	Mrs. McMichael, Alan's mother	
2019	Lie Exposed	Melanie	

=== Television ===
As an actor

Year	Title	Role	Notes
1984	CBS Schoolbreak Special	Linda	Episode: "All the Kids Do It"
1985	Berrenger's	Cammie Springer	Main
1985	Knots Landing	Linda Martin	Recurring
1986	Sword of Gideon	Shoshana	TV movie
1987	Hunter	Julie Lawrence	Episode: "Requiem for Sergeant McCall"
1988	Tales from the Hollywood Hills: Golden Land	Dorrie	TV movie
1988	War and Remembrance	Madeline Henry	Miniseries
1989	American Playhouse	Elizabeth Leopold	Episode: "Ask Me Again"
1990	Working Tra$h	Susan Fahnestock	TV movie
1993	Caught in the Act	Rachel	TV movie
1994	SeaQuest 2032	Marie Piccolo	Episode: "Vapors"
1994	Party of Five	Meg Bennett	Episode: "Grownups"
1995	The Avenging Angel	Liza Rigby	TV movie
1995	Shadow-Ops	Paige	TV movie
1996	Seduced by Madness: The Diane Borchardt Story	Claire Brown	Miniseries
1996	Early Edition	Meredith Carson	Episodes: "The Paper" & "His Girl Thursday"
1998	Blackout Effect	Karen	TV movie
1998	This Matter of Marriage	Hallie Mitchell	TV movie
1998	Star Trek: Deep Space Nine	Kira Meru	Episode: "Wrongs Darker than Death or Night"
1998	Chicago Hope	Vicki Slater	Episodes: "The Ties That Bind" & "Playing Through"
1999	Vengeance Unlimited	Mrs. Thomas	Episode: "Legalese"
1999	Restless Spirits	Charlotte	TV movie
1999	The Outer Limits	Darcy Kipling	Episode: "Alien Radio"
2000	The Outer Limits	Weatherman	Episode: "Zig Zag"
2000	Judging Amy	Dr. Amanda Kubiak	Episode: "Drawing the Line"
2000	Level 9	Grace Bishop aka Gina Bartholomew	Episode: "Mail Call"
2001	RoboCop: Prime Directives	Ann R. Key	Miniseries
2001	Sanctuary	Kirby Fitzsimmons	Television film
2001	The District	Special Agent Grace Curry	Episodes: "Fools Russian: Part 1" & "Fools Russian: Part 2"
2001	Stolen Miracle	Sgt. Jane McKinley	TV movie
2001	24	Teri Bauer	Main role
2003	The Death and Life of Nancy Eaton	Sarah	TV movie
2003	An Unexpected Love	Kate Mayer	TV movie
2003	Line of Fire	Lisa Cohen	Main
2004	Human Cargo	Charlene Fischer	Miniseries
2004	The Incredible Mrs. Ritchie	Joan	TV movie
2004	Meltdown	Zoe Cox	TV movie
2004	Open Heart	Host	TV movie
2004	H_{2}O	Sgt. Leah Collins	Miniseries
2005	House	Victoria Madsen	Episode: "Histories"
2005	The Eleventh Hour	Marsha Segal / Moira Seagull	Episode: "The Miracle Worker"
2005	Hunt for Justice	Camille Gilbert	TV movie
2005–06	Commander in Chief	Melanie Blackston	Episodes: "Pilot", "First Strike", "First... Do No Harm" & "The Price You Pay"
2006	Karol - The Pope, the Man	Julia Ritter	TV movie
2006	Everwood	Laurie Fields	Episodes: "Ghosts", "Lost and Found" & " You're a Good Man, Andy Brown"
2006	Runaway	Lily Rader	Recurring
2007	Eyes	Nan Burgess	Episode: "Karma"
2007	Don't Cry Now	Bonnie	TV movie
2007	CSI: Miami	Denise Partney	Episode: "Permanent Vacation"
2007	Everest '82	Michelle Winegate	Miniseries
2008	The Apostles	Dee Brinjak	TV movie
2008	Law & Order: Criminal Intent	Terri Driver	Episodes: "Neighborhood Watch" & "Last Rites"
2008	Private Practice	Linda	Episode: "Nothing to Talk About"
2008	Faux Baby	Leslie / Dr. Greenfield	Episodes: "Birth of a Faux" & "Valley of the Fauxs"
2008–2010	The Mentalist	Kristina Frye	Episodes: "Seeing Red", "Red Letter", "Red Sky in the Morning" & "The Blood on His Hands"
2009	Jesse Stone: Thin Ice	Sidney Greenstreet	TV movie
2009	Black Rain	Carol Grey	TV movie
2010	Seven Deadly Sins	Det. Sharon Geary	Episodes: " Episode #1.1" & " Episode #1.2"
2010	Tangled	Marlene	TV movie
2011	Off the Map	Bridget Clemmons	Episode: "There's Nothing to Fix"
2012	The River	Tess Cole	Main role
2012	Castle	Gwenn Harwin	Episode: "Secret Santa"
2013	Revolution	President Foster	Recurring
2013–2016	NCIS	SECNAV Sarah Porter	Recurring
2014	The Strain	Joan Luss	Recurring
2014	Tyrant	Lea Exley	Recurring
2015	Blue Bloods	Anne Farrell	Episodes: "Through the Looking Glass" & "Payback"
2015	NCIS: New Orleans	SECNAV Sarah Porter	Episode: "Touched by the Sun"
2015	Jesse Stone: Lost in Paradise	Sidney Greenstreet	TV movie
2016	Murdoch Mysteries	Elizabeth Cummersworth	Episode: "Unlucky in Love"
2016–17	Suits	Anita Gibbs	Recurring
2017	Slasher: Guilty Party	Judith Berry	Main
2018	Station 19	Battalion Chief Frankel	Episodes: "Invisible to Me", "Contain the Flame" & "Stronger Together"

As a director

Year	Title	Notes
2008	What I See When I Close My Eyes	Documentary short
2008	A Very Merry Daughter of the Bride	TV movie
2009	My Neighbor's Secret	TV movie
2010	Gaykeith	Video short
2011–2019	Murdoch Mysteries	8 episodes: "Dial M for Murdoch", "Colour Blinded", "Hades Hath No Fury", "Master Lovecraft", "Crabtree a la Carte", "The Great White Moose", "Secrets and Lies", "Pirates of the Great Lakes"
2012	Merry In-Laws	TV movie
2012	Buried Treasure	Short
2013	Christmas on the Bayou	TV movie
2016	Aftermath	2 episodes: "Now That We Talk of Dying", "Where the Dead Men Lost Their Bones"
2017	Ghost Wars	2 episodes: "The Curse of Copperhead Road", "The Ghost in the Machine"
2017	Frankie Drake Mysteries	Episode: "Whisper Sisters"
2018–2021	Van Helsing	4 episodes: "Hunted Down", "Christ Pose", "State of the Union", "Graveyard Smash"
2019–20	The Order	4 episodes: "Homecoming, Part One", "Homecoming, Part Two", "Free Radicals, Part 1", "Free Radicals, Part 2"
2019–2021	Lost in Space	3 episodes: "Echoes", "Stuck", "Contingencies on Contingencies"
2019–2022	Law & Order: Special Victims Unit	3 episodes: "Counselor, It's Chinatown", "Dance, Lies and Videotape", "Sorry If It Got Weird for You"
2020	Emergence	Episode: "15 Years"
2021	Gratified	Short
2021–22	Snowpiercer	9 episodes: "Keep Hope Alive", "Many Miles from Snowpiercer", "Bound by One Track", "Born to Bleed", "Setting Itself Right", "Life Source", "North Star", "A Moth to a Flame", "By Weeping Cross"
2022	NCIS: Hawai'i	Episode: "Monster"
2022	Star Trek: Strange New Worlds	Episode: "Ghosts of Illyria"
2022	Devil in Ohio	2 episodes: "Alight", "My Love and I"
2023	A Small Light	2 episodes "The Butterfly" and "Schiebfield"
2024	Law & Order: Organized Crime	Episode: "Redcoat"
2024	Murder in a Small Town	Episode: "Fall from Grace"
2025	The Better Sister	2 episodes "Lotta Sky" and "Incoming Widow"
