= List of Ozark characters =

Ozark is an American crime drama television series about a married couple who are forced to relocate their family to the Ozarks following a money laundering scheme that goes awry.

The series features an ensemble cast including Jason Bateman, Laura Linney, Sofia Hublitz, Skylar Gaertner, Julia Garner, Jordana Spiro, Jason Butler Harner, Esai Morales, Peter Mullan, Lisa Emery and Charlie Tahan. Janet McTeer, Tom Pelphrey and Jessica Frances Dukes joined the main cast in the show's third season. Felix Solis, Damian Young, Alfonso Herrera, and Adam Rothenberg joined the cast for the fourth and final season.

This list includes the series' main cast, as well as all recurring characters, and any other guest who is otherwise notable.

== Overview ==
= Main cast (credited)
= Recurring cast (3+)
= Guest cast (1-2)

Portrayed by	Character	Appearances					Count
Portrayed by	Character	Season 1	Season 2	Season 3	Season 4		Count
Portrayed by	Character	Season 1	Season 2	Season 3	Part 1	Part 2	Count
Main characters
Jason Bateman	Marty Byrde	Main	Main	Main	Main	Main	44
Laura Linney	Wendy Byrde	Main	Main	Main	Main	Main	44
Sofia Hublitz	Charlotte Byrde	Main	Main	Main	Main	Main	43
Skylar Gaertner	Jonah Byrde	Main	Main	Main	Main	Main	43
Julia Garner	Ruth Langmore	Main	Main	Main	Main	Main	42
Jordana Spiro	Rachel Garrison	Main	Main			Recurring	18
Jason Butler Harner	Roy Petty	Main	Main				18
Esai Morales	Camino "Del" Del Rio	Main					4
Peter Mullan	Jacob Snell	Main	Main				14
Lisa Emery	Darlene Snell	Main	Main	Main	Main		30
Charlie Tahan	Wyatt Langmore	Recurring	Main	Main	Main	Main	34
Janet McTeer	Helen Pierce		Recurring	Main			17
Tom Pelphrey	Ben Davis			Main		Guest	9
Jessica Frances Dukes	Maya Miller			Main	Main	Main	15
Felix Solis	Omar Navarro			Recurring	Main	Main	19
Damian Young	Jim Rattelsdorf		Recurring	Recurring	Main	Main	15
Alfonso Herrera	Javi Elizondro				Main (Note: Herrera appears in only one episode of season 4 part 2 although credited with the main cast)	Main	6
Adam Rothenberg	Mel Sattem				Main	Main	9
Recurring characters
McKinley Belcher III	Trevor Evans	Recurring	Guest	Recurring	Guest		16
Michael Mosley	Mason Young	Recurring	Recurring				9
Harris Yulin	Buddy Dieker	Recurring	Recurring				12
Marc Menchaca	Russ Langmore	Recurring	Guest			Guest	11
Trevor Long	Cade Langmore	Recurring	Recurring			Guest	15
Kevin L. Johnson	Sam Dermody	Recurring	Recurring	Recurring	Recurring	Recurring	22
Carson Holmes	Three Langmore	Recurring	Recurring	Recurring	Recurring	Recurring	25
Christopher James Baker	Boyd Langmore	Recurring				Guest	8
Evan George Vourazeris	Tuck	Recurring	Recurring			Guest	10
Robert Treveiler	John Nix	Recurring	Recurring	Recurring	Guest		14
Michael Tourek	Ash	Recurring	Guest				6
Bethany Anne Lind	Grace Young	Recurring					5
Joseph Melendez	Garcia	Recurring					4
Lindsay Ayliffe	Harry	Guest	Recurring		Guest	Guest	7
Darren Goldstein	Charles Wilkes		Recurring	Guest		Guest	10
Nelson Bonilla	Nelson		Recurring	Recurring	Recurring	Recurring	21
Melissa Saint-Amand	Jade		Recurring	Recurring			7
John Bedford Lloyd	Frank Cosgrove		Recurring	Recurring	Recurring		10
Tess Malis Kincaid	SAC Hannah Clay		Recurring	Guest	Recurring	Recurring	11
Pedro Lopez	Jorge Mendoza		Guest	Recurring			5
Joseph Sikora	Frank Cosgrove Jr.			Recurring	Recurring	Recurring	14
Madison Thompson	Erin Pierce			Recurring	Guest	Guest	10
Marylouise Burke	Sue Shelby			Recurring			5
Tyler Chase	Tommy Walsh			Recurring			5
Katrina Lenk	Clare Shaw				Recurring	Recurring	8
CC Castillo	Leigh Guerrero				Recurring	Guest	5
Eric Ladin	Kerry Stone				Recurring		3
Ali Stroker	Charles-Ann				Recurring	Guest	4
Richard Thomas	Nathan Davis				Recurring	Recurring	9
Bruce Davison	Randall Schafer				Guest	Recurring	6
Bruno Bichir	Father Benitez				Guest	Recurring	6
Veronica Falcón	Camila Elizondro					Recurring	5
Jane McNeill	Annalise					Recurring	5
Brad Carter	Ronnie Wycoff					Recurring	3

== Main characters ==
=== Marty Byrde ===
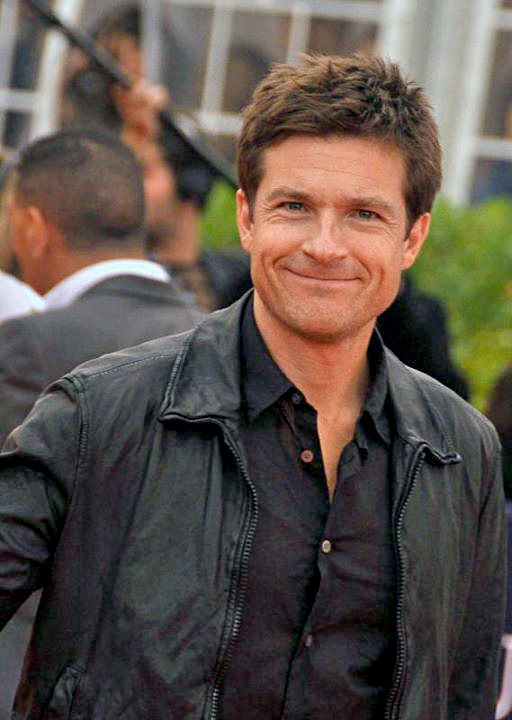
Jason Bateman

Martin "Marty" Byrde (portrayed by Jason Bateman; seasons 1-4) is the husband of Wendy Byrde and father of Charlotte and Jonah Byrde. He was a self-employed financial advisor based in Chicago in 2007, when he and his business partner began to launder money for a Mexican drug cartel.

=== Wendy Byrde ===
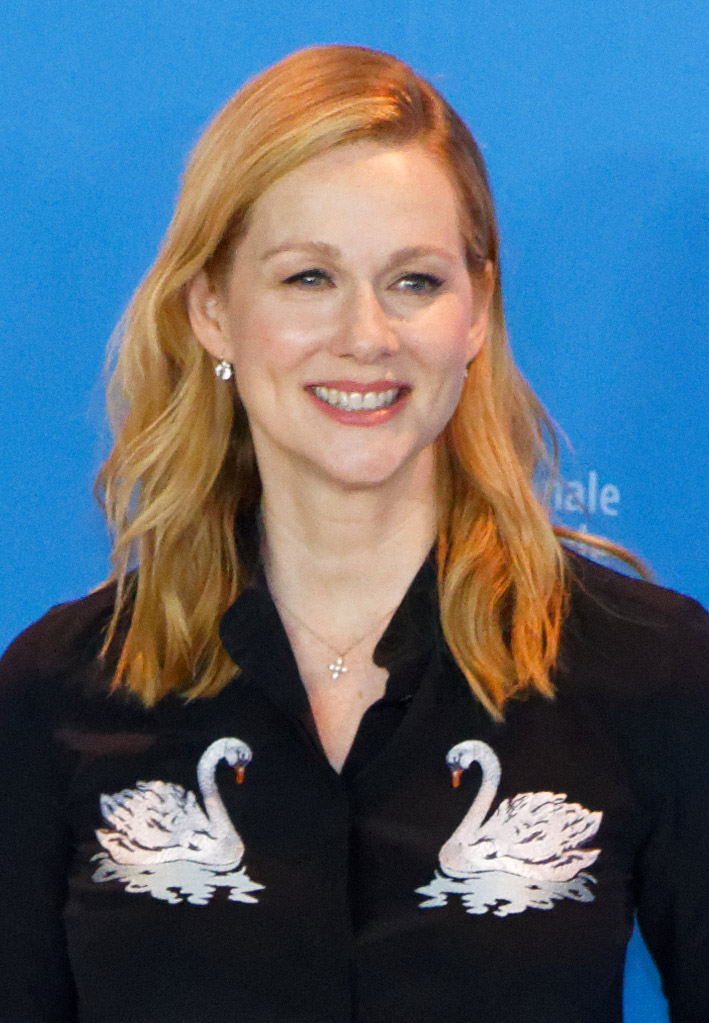
Laura Linney

Wendy Byrde (portrayed by Laura Linney; seasons 1-4) is the wife of Marty Byrde and the mother of Charlotte and Jonah Byrde. Born to a religious family in the Midwest, Wendy ran away from home as a teenager, leaving behind her brother Ben, who was diagnosed with severe bipolar disorder. An experienced political consultant who worked on Barack Obama's Illinois Senate campaigns and Bobby Rush's congressional campaigns, Wendy quit her job after Charlotte was born, and entered a deep depression after suffering a miscarriage resulting from a car crash. She and Marty agreed to launder money for the Navarro drug cartel in 2007, seeing an opportunity to dramatically improve their lives. However, Wendy began feeling emotionally distant from Marty and began an affair with lawyer Gary Silverberg.

Marty is forced to relocate the family to the Ozarks after the cartel murders his business partners for skimming $8 million; the cartel murders Silverberg after Wendy attempts to escape with the family's money. After moving to the Ozarks, Wendy first gets a job as a stager for a local realtor, and later leverages her political experience in currying favor with billionaire philanthropist Charles Wilkes to approve the construction of a casino used to launder the cartel's money. Wendy gradually grows to enjoy the power and status she gains through her activities with the cartel, and orders a hit on Ruth's father Cade Langmore after he assaults Charlotte. This strengthens her relationship with the cartel and spurs her personal ambition while driving a wedge in her marriage with Marty. The family's situation is further complicated when Wendy's brother Ben comes to stay with them; Ben begins a relationship with Ruth and eventually goes off his medication, increasingly jeopardizing the Byrdes' safety. Wendy ultimately allows the cartel to execute Ben, permanently damaging her relationships with Jonah and Ruth. Struggling to cope with her guilt, Wendy misleads police into conducting an investigation into Ben's "disappearance" and falsely tells the public that Ben suffered from a drug addiction.

=== Charlotte Byrde ===
Charlotte Byrde (portrayed by Sofia Hublitz; seasons 1-4) is the daughter of Marty and Wendy Byrde, and older sister to Jonah Byrde. She regularly expresses her dissatisfaction with the family's decision to move to the Ozarks, but gradually becomes more supportive of the family and eventually helps manage the operations of the Byrde Foundation.

=== Jonah Byrde ===
Jonah Byrde (portrayed by Skylar Gaertner; seasons 1-4) is the son of Marty and Wendy Byrde. Shy, reserved, and curious, Jonah demonstrates a precocious intelligence throughout the series, learning how to hunt and handle firearms from the Byrdes' terminally ill tenant Buddy – with whom he develops a close friendship – and eventually laundering money on his own through cryptocurrency investments at age 14. Jonah becomes disillusioned with his family after Wendy allows the cartel to kill her brother Ben for compromising their safety, and spends much of the fourth season rebelling against the Byrdes by working with Ruth (who also fell out with the family over Ben's death).

=== Ruth Langmore ===
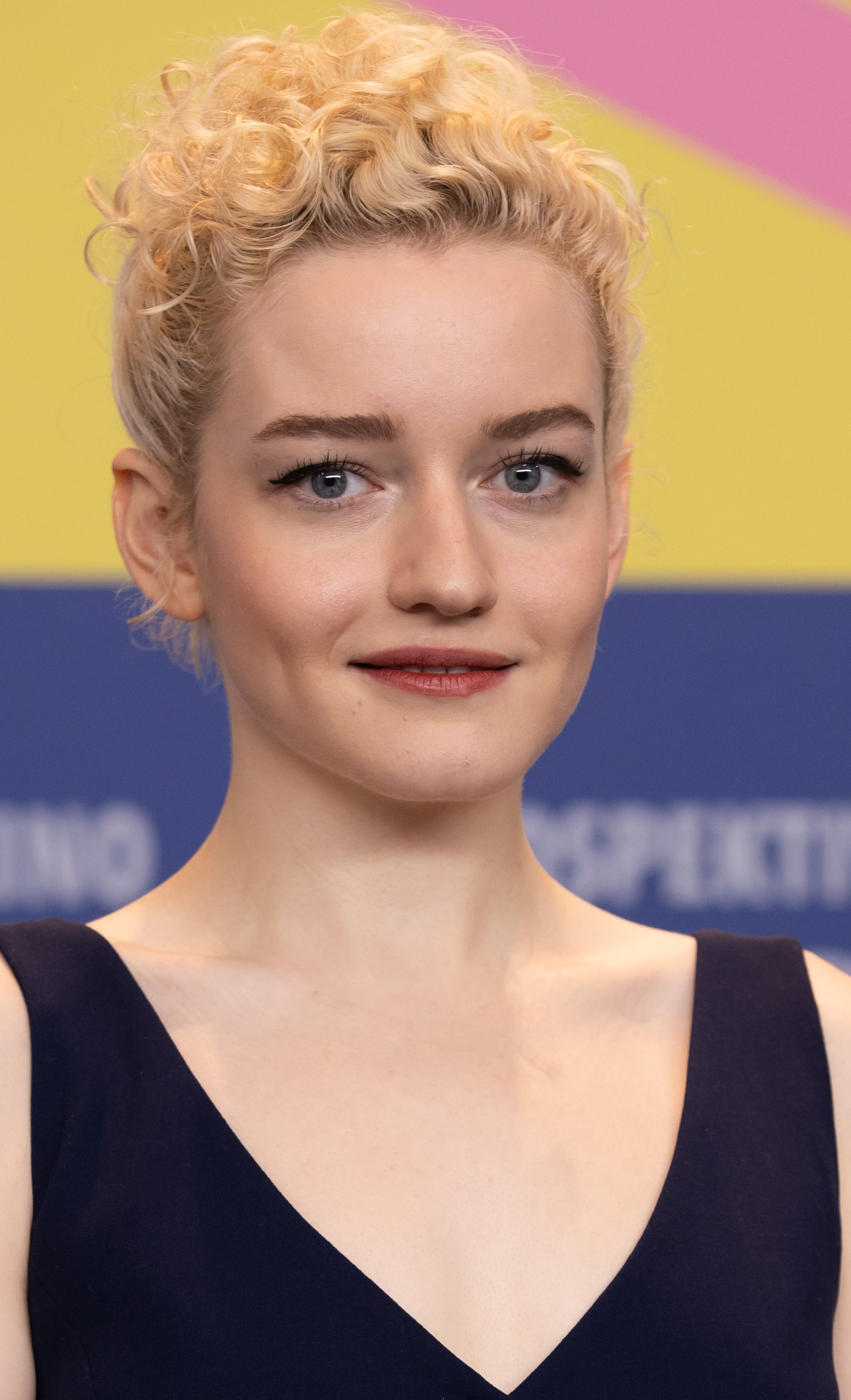
Julia Garner

Ruth Langmore (portrayed by Julia Garner; seasons 1-4) is a young woman who is part of a local criminal family. While initially intending to use and betray Marty, she soon becomes business partners with him and ends up forming a genuine friendship with him. Ruth has a difficult relationship with her father, Cade, who is shown to be a criminal and often abuses and mistreats her. She begins a relationship with Ben Davis in season 3. After Ben goes off his medication and begins jeopardizing the Byrdes' survival, Wendy allows the cartel to execute him; an enraged Ruth quits working for the Byrdes and briefly joins Darlene's heroin operation, with Jonah laundering their money due to his own anger with Wendy. Ruth makes plans to leave the Ozarks with Wyatt, but he and Darlene are murdered by Javi Elizonndro. Upon finding their bodies, a devastated Ruth arrives at Marty's home with a shotgun and threatens to kill him unless he names Wyatt's killer. Jonah gives Ruth Javi's name, and she resolves to hunt him down despite Marty and Wendy's protests.

=== Rachel Garrison ===
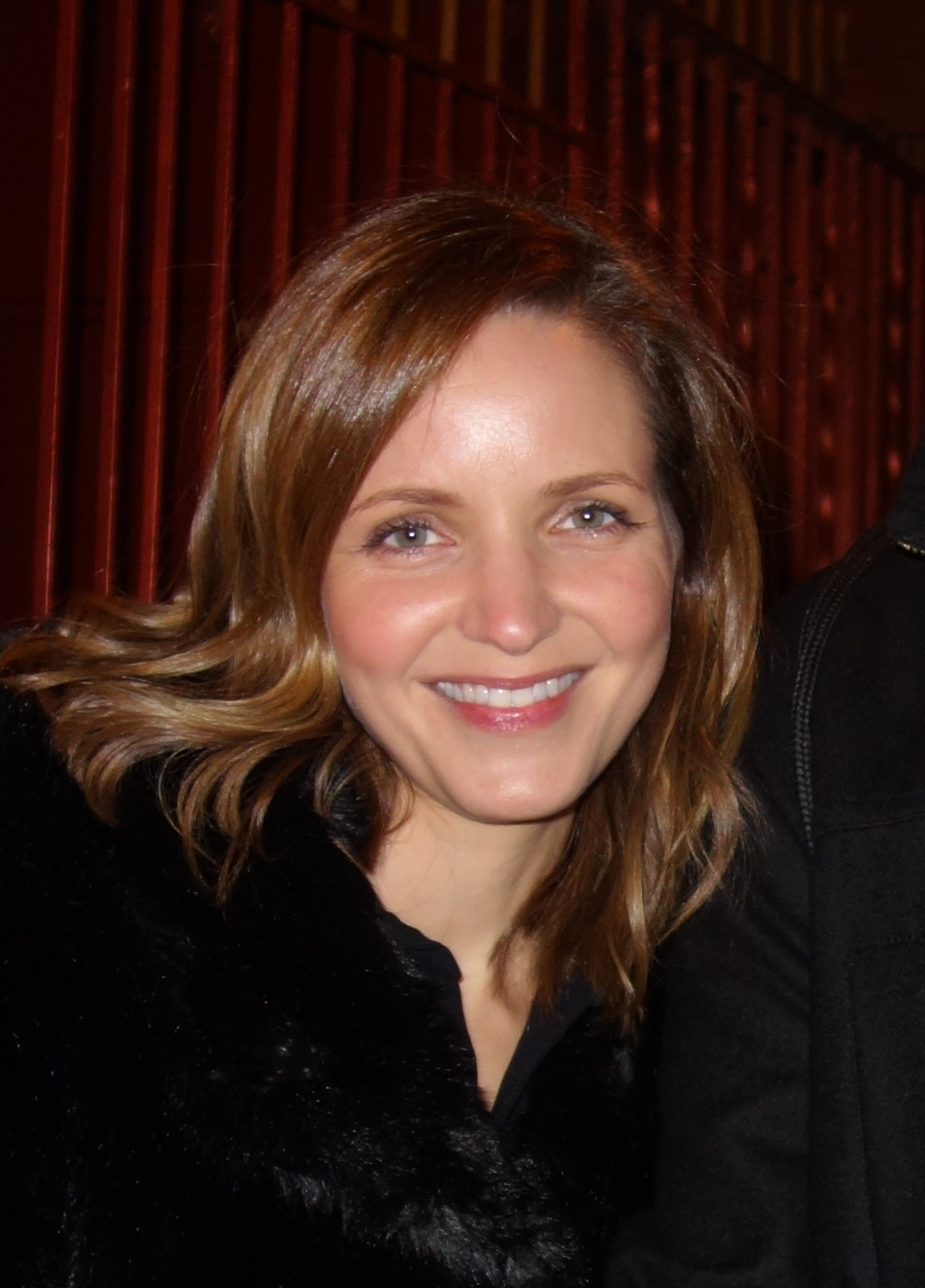
Jordana Spiro

Rachel Garrison (portrayed by Jordana Spiro; main: seasons 1-2; recurring: season 4) is the owner of the Blue Cat hotel and bar and Marty's reluctant business partner. Throughout most of season 1, Rachel has a healthy and friendly relationship with Marty until she discovers his money laundering scheme and, despite agreeing to continue to work with him, loses all trust in him. Rachel later steals $300,000 from Marty from the $50 million of cartel money he had been hiding in the walls of the Blue Cat. With this money she flees the Ozarks and sometime later is seen suffering from substance abuse. While under the influence, Rachel crashes her car into a lamppost. Agent Petty uses these legal troubles to coerce Garrison into returning to the Ozarks and wearing a wire to spy on Marty. Returning in season 4, she returns to the Ozarks from Miami as part of Ruth's plan to purchase the Missouri Belle casino as revenge against the Byrdes, with Rachel being the legal owner due to Ruth's criminal record. Although initially hesitant after learning that the casino is a money laundering front and that Ruth murdered someone, Rachel supports her after learning that the casino resulted in loss of customers for the Blue Cat and Tuck becoming unemployed. Rachel realizes that Ruth may already legally own the casino, assuming that Darlene's share was inherited by Wyatt, and then by Ruth.

=== Roy Petty ===
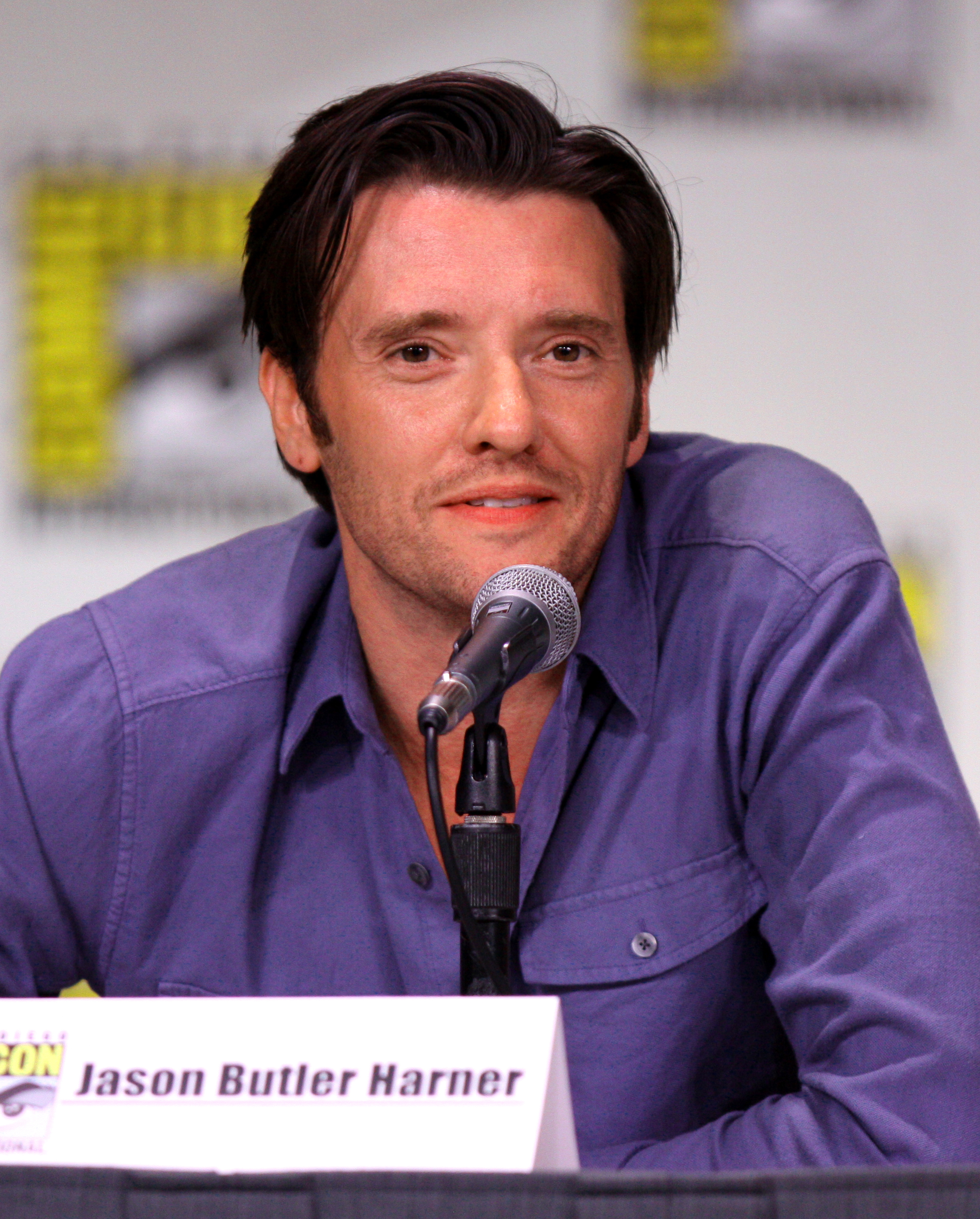
Jason Butler Harner

Roy Petty (portrayed by Jason Butler Harner; seasons 1-2) is an FBI agent investigating Marty. During season 1 Roy develops a sexual relationship with Russ Langmore who he later betrays and blackmails into becoming an informant. This ultimately backfires on Petty when Russ is murdered by Ruth, leading him to turn his attention to Rachel who he forces into spying on Marty. Petty takes care of his drug-addicted mother and also exhibits sociopathic behavior, which makes him a dangerous liability for the FBI. Petty was assaulted and murdered by Cade Langmore, after he taunted him by saying that Ruth would be imprisoned for her involvement with the Byrdes.

=== Camino Del Rio ===
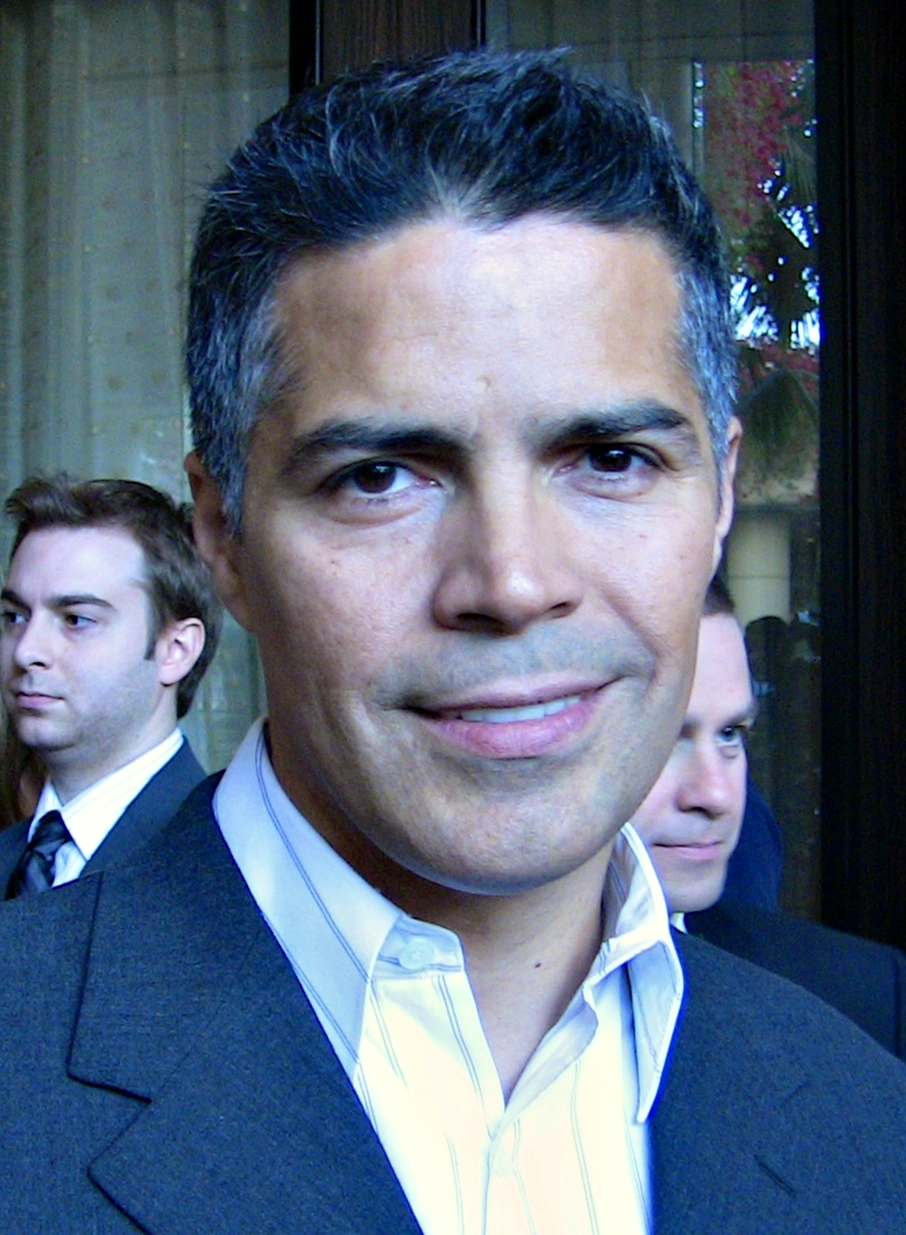
Esai Morales

Camino "Del" Del Rio (portrayed by Esai Morales; season 1) is a lieutenant for Mexico's Navarro drug cartel. He recruited Marty to launder the cartel's money through the latter's Chicago-based firm ten years prior to the series' events, admiring Marty's financial expertise and personal integrity. At the start of the series, Del comes to learn that Marty's business partners have skimmed $8 million in cartel money over a three-year period and murders all of them; Marty saves his own life by making a spur-of-the-moment offer to move his operation from Chicago to the Ozarks, where he promises to launder a significantly larger share of the cartel's money. Marty eventually arranges a deal between Del and the Snells to open a riverboat casino to launder the cartel's profits in exchange for the cartel distributing the Snells' heroin. The two parties shake hands, but Del insults the Snells by calling them "rednecks"; Darlene retaliates by killing Del on the spot.

=== Jacob Snell ===
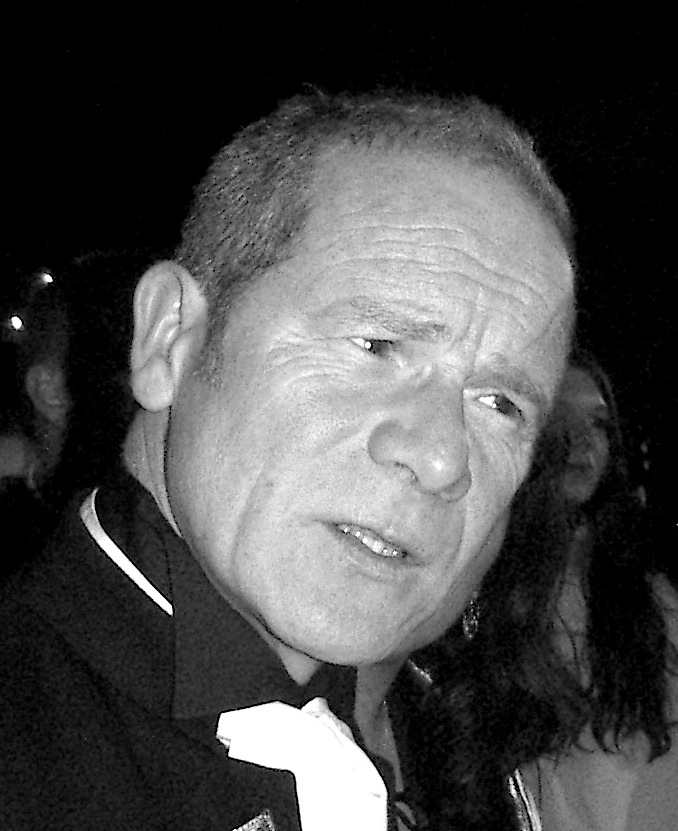
Peter Mullan

Jacob Snell (portrayed by Peter Mullan; seasons 1-2) is the crime boss of Osage Beach. He is an established local heroin producer; his family has supplied and produced heroin in the area since the Great Depression. He is married to Darlene Snell, who is also his business partner. They have a strong bond, which is tested when they go into business with the Byrdes. Eventually, the two have a falling out, with Jacob planning to kill Darlene over a disagreement in what direction to take their business, before Darlene finds out and kills Jacob first.

=== Darlene Snell ===
Darlene Snell (portrayed by Lisa Emery; seasons 1-4) is Jacob's wife and partner in the heroin business. She is shown to be fiercely proud, short-tempered and impulsively violent. At the end of the first season, Marty arranges a deal between the Snells and the Navarro cartel (represented by Del) to open a riverboat casino on the Snells' land, but Darlene kills Del with a shotgun after he refers to the Snells as "rednecks". Jacob in turn murders the Snells' loyal servant Ash - whom Darlene viewed as a surrogate son - in order to appease the cartel. The cartel orders the Snells' poppy fields burned to deter the FBI investigation into the Byrdes; Darlene retaliates by poisoning a heroin shipment, killing 57 people. The cartel in turn attempts to assassinate the Snells. Jacob makes a deal with Marty and Helen to cede much of the Snells' land to the U.S. government to build the Byrdes' casino. Realizing Darlene will never comply with the cartel's terms, Jacob attempts to kill her, but she anticipates this and kills him first. Afterwards, Darlene takes over as the area's crime boss, and becomes the adoptive mother of Zeke. In season 3, she allows Wyatt to live with her in exchange for him helping on her farmland, and the two begin a sexual relationship. Ruth briefly joins Darlene's operation after falling out with the Byrdes, but Darlene cuts ties with her after learning she has been selling their heroin to Marty behind her back. After Wendy arranges to have Social Services remove Zeke from Darlene's care, Wyatt proposes to her to help win the child back. However, Darlene and Wyatt are promptly shot dead by cartel lieutenant Javi Elizonndro after getting married, as retaliation for Darlene continuing to produce heroin against the cartel's wishes.

=== Wyatt Langmore ===
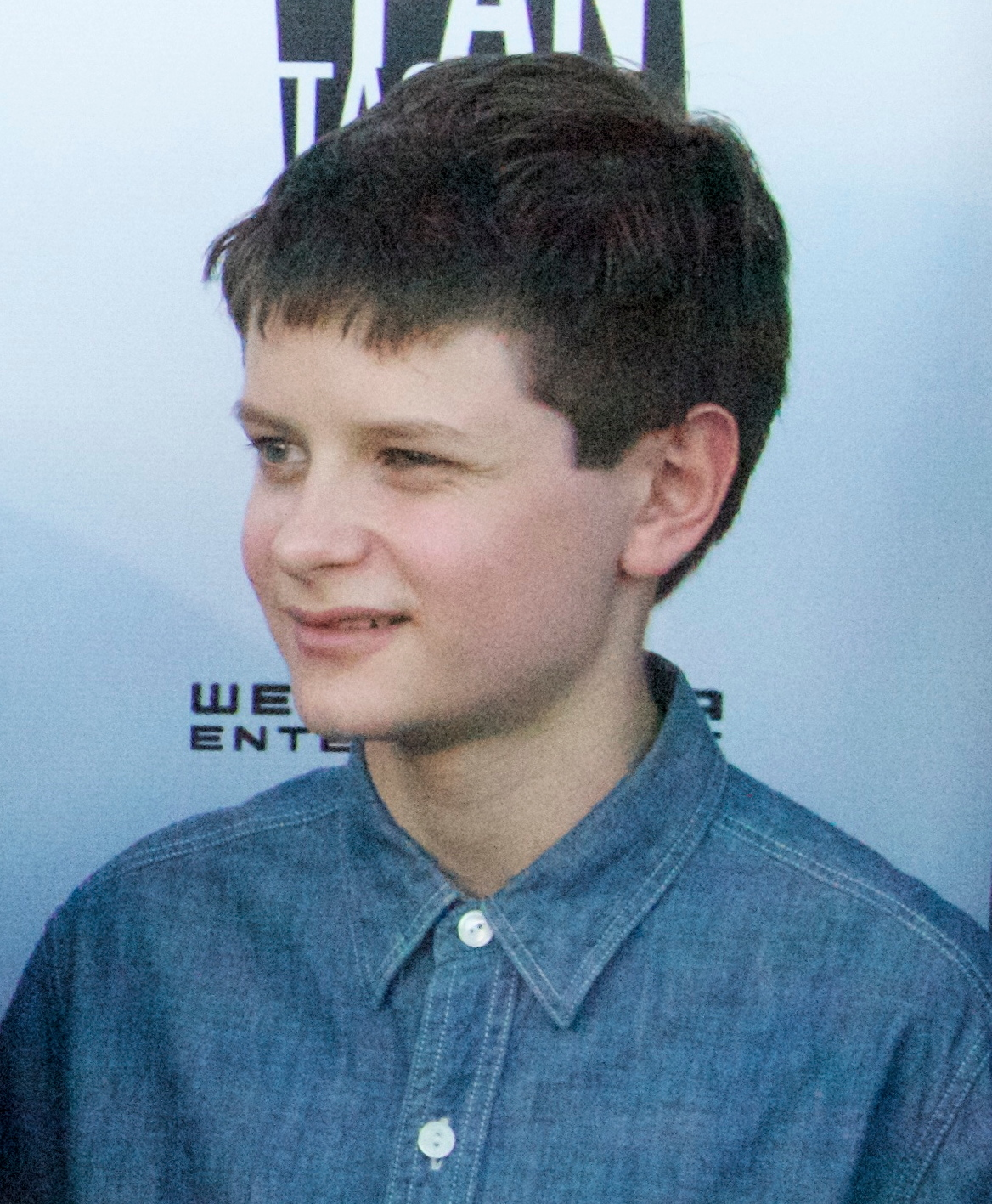
Charlie Tahan

Wyatt Langmore (portrayed by Charlie Tahan; main: seasons 2-4; recurring: season 1) is Russ's elder son and Ruth's cousin. He becomes good friends with Charlotte. He gets into college, but after learning that Ruth killed Russ, instead of attending, he moves in with Darlene Snell in exchange for doing work on her farm land. Eventually, he begins having a relationship with her. He marries her to prevent Zeke from being taken into foster care, but is shot and killed by Javi.

=== Helen Pierce ===
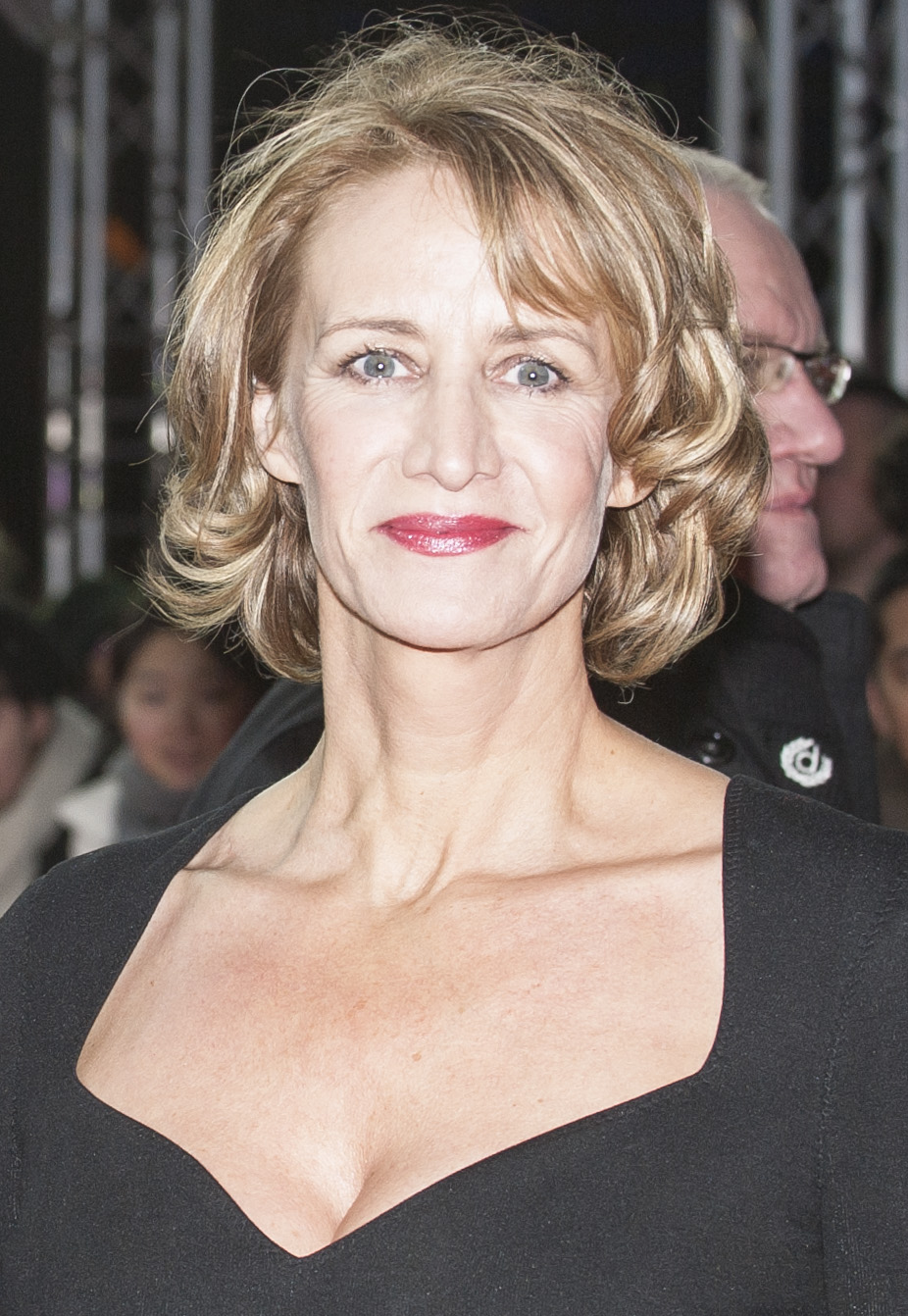
Janet McTeer

Helen Pierce (portrayed by Janet McTeer; main: season 3; recurring: season 2) is the Chicago-based attorney and fixer for the cartel. She takes part in a number of crimes for the cartel, even to the point of ordering murders. She teams up with Wendy Byrde to expand their laundering empire to include casinos and resorts, against the wishes of Marty Byrde. Over time, her relationship with the cartel weakens as Omar Navarro grows closer in his relationship with the Byrdes. At the end of Season 3, he invites Pierce and the Byrdes to visit him in Mexico, where he immediately murders her in front of the Byrdes, as she is no longer of use to him.

=== Ben Davis ===
Ben Davis (portrayed by Tom Pelphrey; main: season 3; guest: season 4) is Wendy's brother, who suffers from severe bipolar disorder. After getting fired from his job as a substitute teacher, Ben moves in with the Byrdes, and learns about their involvement with the cartel after witnessing Marty get kidnapped. He begins a romantic relationship with Ruth and goes off his medication to perform sexually. However, he gradually begins to unravel and is committed to a mental institution after assaulting Marty at a fundraiser event. Ruth gets him released with Darlene's help, but Ben travels to Helen Pierce's house and reveals her cartel activities to her daughter Erin, making him a liability for both the Byrdes and the cartel. He and Wendy flee the Ozarks, but after Ben repeatedly tries to contact the cartel to make amends, Wendy realizes he will not be able to keep himself safe and gives up his location to the cartel, allowing them to execute him. His death permanently damages Wendy's relationships with Ruth and Jonah. Wendy later fabricates the story that Ben suffered from drug addiction and is missing, resulting in a public effort to locate him.

=== Maya Miller ===
Maya Miller (portrayed by Jessica Frances Dukes; seasons 3-4) is an FBI forensic accountant investigating the Byrdes' casino business. Marty spends much of the third season attempting to turn her into an asset for the cartel, despite knowing she is likely incorruptible. In season 4, Maya briefly moves in with the Byrdes, becoming their third tenant (after Buddy and Ben). Maya strikes a deal with Navarro for him to become an informant to the FBI in exchange for immunity, but after she finds out the FBI has no intention of stopping the Navarro cartel, she turns him in to the local police jurisdiction.

=== Omar Navarro ===
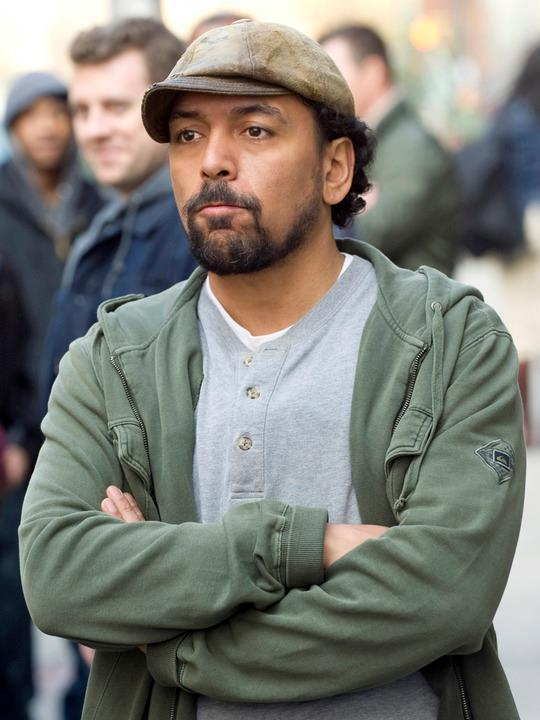
Felix Solis

Omar Navarro (portrayed by Felix Solis; main: season 4; recurring: season 3) is the leader of a Mexican drug cartel. He becomes close to the Byrdes, to the point where he kills Helen Pierce and communicates directly with Marty and Wendy. While ruthless, he is cautious and careful with his movements. In season 4, sensing that his nephew Javi's reckless leadership is going to bring down the cartel, he decides to "retire", while agreeing with Maya to be an FBI informant in exchange for immunity. However, when Maya learns that the FBI has no intention of stopping the Navarro cartel, she reneges on the deal and has Navarro arrested by the local police jurisdiction.

=== Jim Rattelsdorf ===
Jim Rattelsdorf (portrayed by Damian Young; main: season 4; recurring: seasons 2-3) is Charlie Wilkes' right-hand man who becomes an ally of the Byrdes. In season 4, they hire him as their personal attorney.

=== Javier "Javi" Elizonndro ===
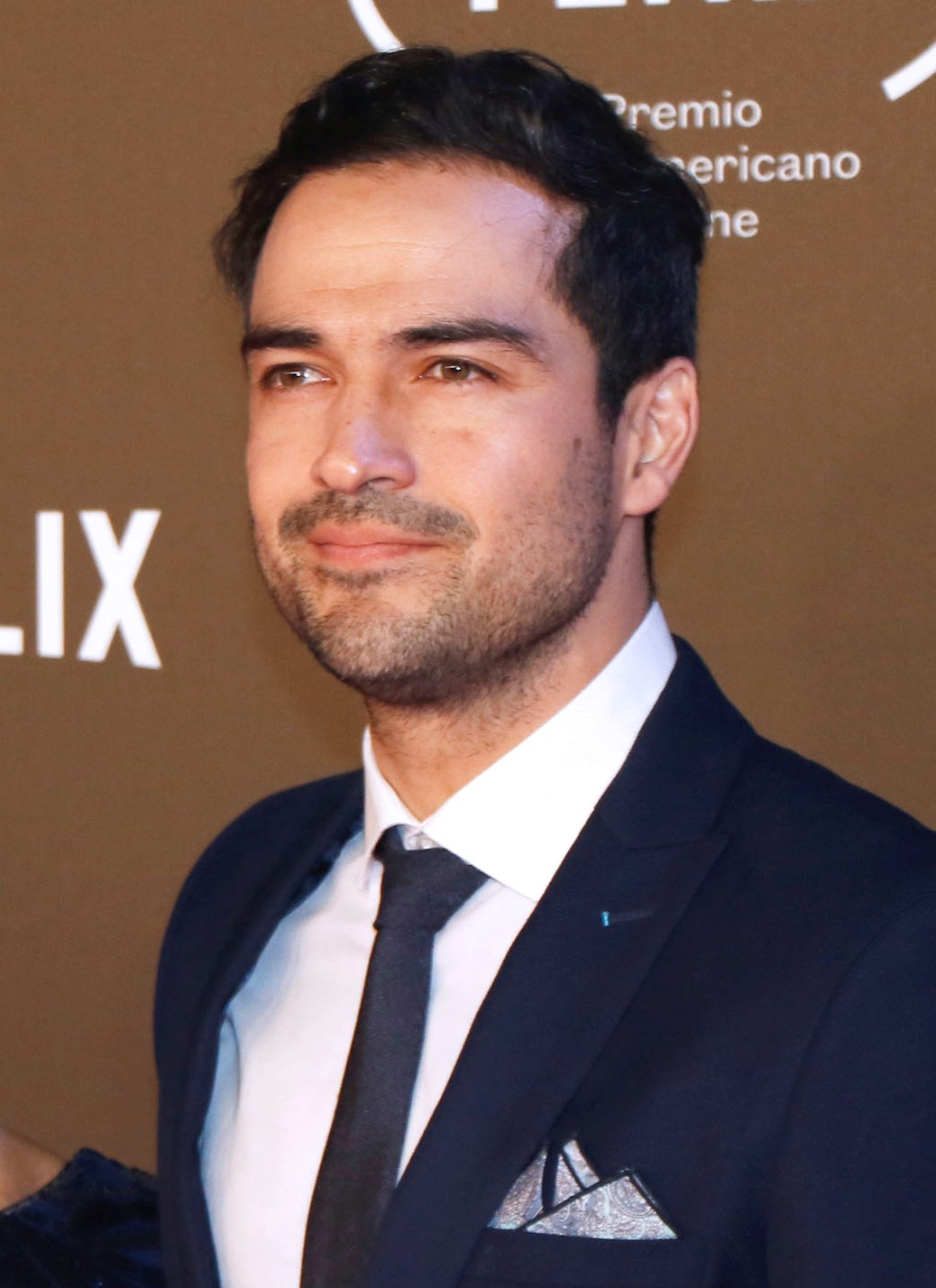
Alfonso Herrera

Javier "Javi" Elizonndro (portrayed by Alfonso Herrera; season 4), is Omar Navarro's hotheaded nephew and a lieutenant in the cartel. He wants a bigger leadership role, so he heads to the Ozarks to learn more about the Byrdes. Navarro does not trust Javi because of his immaturity and impulsiveness, so he decides to "retire", making Javi the de facto leader. Javi kills Darlene and Wyatt as punishment for continuing Darlene's heroin operation in competition with the cartel. Ruth kills Javi as revenge for murdering Wyatt.

=== Mel Sattem ===
Mel Sattem (portrayed by Adam Rothenberg; season 4), is a disgraced former cop turned private investigator. Initially, he searches for Helen Pierce to get divorce papers from her ex-husband signed. However, as he learns more about what's going on with the Byrdes, he starts pursuing other investigations as well.

== Recurring characters ==
=== Buddy Dieker ===
Buddy Dieker (portrayed by Harris Yulin) is the terminally ill tenant of the Byrde's. He develops a close bond with the family, in particular with Wendy and Jonah, and would later help them with their dealings. He was originally from Detroit, Michigan and was a Teamsters Union leader at General Motors before retiring and moving to Missouri. He also was a veteran and a helicopter pilot in the Vietnam War. He was married at one point, but little is known about what happened to his "one true love." At Buddy's funeral, Wendy states "we weren't related, but he was family."

=== Trevor Evans ===
Trevor Evans (portrayed by McKinley Belcher III) is an FBI agent and Petty's ex-lover. He takes over the FBI's investigation into the Byrdes after Petty's death, and comes at odds with agent Maya Miller in his dogged commitment to arresting Marty as retribution for Petty's death. Maya eventually gets him suspended from the Bureau.

=== John Nix ===
John Nix (portrayed by Robert Treveiler) is the sheriff of Osage Beach, who is indebted to the Snells. He tends to look the other way in regards to the Byrdes' activities due to their own partnership with the Snells. In season 4, he is murdered by cartel lieutenant Javi Elizondro while investigating Helen Pierce's disappearance.

=== Sam Dermody ===
Sam Dermody (portrayed by Kevin L. Johnson) is a hapless, gullible realtor that Wendy first meets when looking for a home in the Ozarks. After Sam's overbearing mother Eugenia dies in a freak accident, Marty and Wendy pay for her funeral and end up buying the funeral home as a laundering front. Sam is later employed as the manager of the Lickety Splitz, a strip club purchased by the Byrdes for money laundering, and forms a romantic relationship with Jade, one of the strippers. In the third season, Sam begins to frequent the Byrdes' casino, the Missouri Belle, and develops a gambling addiction that Wendy later curtails by banning him from the premises. Ruth then employs Sam as the manager of the Lazy-O Motel, which she purchases for her own money laundering operation after cutting ties with the Byrdes.

=== Bruce Liddell ===
Bruce Liddell (portrayed by Josh Randall) is Marty Byrde's partner in the Chicago-based investment firm they agree to use to launder money for a Mexican drug cartel. Bruce and the trucking company owners who move the cash skim $8 million, and Del murders them after the cartel discovers the theft. The promotional flier for Ozarks tourism Bruce showed Marty helped save Marty's life by serving as the inspiration for Marty's claim that if allowed to move there, he could successfully launder even more of the cartel's money.

=== Bobby Dean ===
Bobby Dean (portrayed by Adam Boyer) is the initial owner of the Lickety Splitz strip club, through which he was laundering money for the Snells. Marty eventually takes over the business, prompting the Snells to kill Bobby and float his body onto the Byrdes' dock as a warning.

=== Mason Young ===
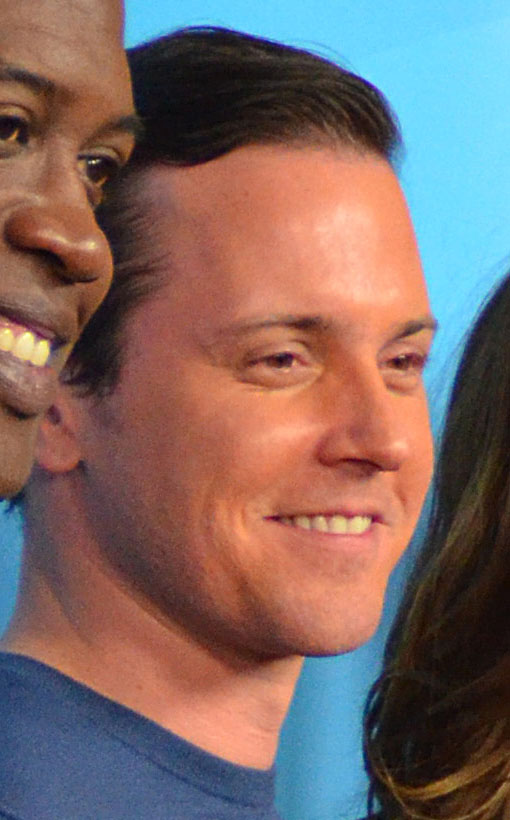
Michael Mosley

Mason Young (portrayed by Michael Mosley) is the pastor of a boat-based congregation. Unbeknownst to Young, the Snells have been distributing their heroin to members of his congregation by hiding the drugs in the hymnals. After learning this, Mason discontinues his services rather than take part in what he deems to be immoral activity. In revenge, the Snells kill his pregnant wife, Grace, and cut their infant son out of her body. In season 2, Mason becomes homeless and has his son, Zeke, taken from him to be a ward of the state, which leads Mason to kidnap Wendy as a bid to get his son back. Despite Marty being able to return Zeke to Mason, Mason refuses to allow Wendy or Marty to leave and is eventually shot and killed by Marty as a result.

=== Russ Langmore ===
Russ Langmore (portrayed by Marc Menchaca) is the father of Wyatt Langmore, and brother of Cade and Boyd Langmore. He forms a sexual relationship with Agent Petty who later betrays Russ and blackmails him into becoming an informant. When Ruth discovers that Russ has become an informant and plans to kill Marty, she murders both him and Boyd by electrocution.

=== Three Langmore ===
Three Langmore (portrayed by Carson Holmes) is Wyatt's younger brother.

=== Cade Langmore ===
Cade Langmore (portrayed by Trevor Long) is the father of Ruth Langmore and the brother of Russ and Boyd Langmore. He is very controlling of his daughter, Ruth, and often abuses and mistreats her. He spends all of season 1 in prison where he is visited regularly by Ruth. At the start of season 2, Cade is released from prison but continues to break the law.

=== Charles Wilkes ===
Charles Wilkes (portrayed by Darren Goldstein) is a wealthy businessman and conservative political donor. Marty and Wendy pursue Wilkes' support in getting a riverboat casino built in the Ozarks; Wilkes becomes particularly close with Wendy, with whom he is infatuated, but becomes gradually hesitant to work with the Byrdes amid the looming FBI investigation into their activities. Wendy eventually extorts Wilkes into backing the casino legislation by donating to his charity with cartel money, forcing his cooperation. Wilkes' lawyer and right-hand man Jim Rattelsdorf goes on to become the Byrdes' trusted ally and personal attorney. Helen later attempts to partner with Wilkes to obtain her own casino license, hoping to leverage his animosity against the Byrdes, but she is killed by the cartel.

=== Frank Cosgrove ===
Frank Cosgrove (portrayed by John Bedford Lloyd) is the head of the Kansas City mafia. A former representative of the United Auto Workers union from Detroit, Cosgrove has been running his trucking business out of Missouri ever since the mob invested in various local casinos. Marty first crosses paths with Cosgrove when seeking the union's approval to build his own casino, enlisting the aid of Buddy - an old acquaintance of Cosgrove's. While the casino project proves successful, Marty eventually cuts ties with Cosgrove after his son, Frank Jr., brutally attacks Ruth in retaliation for the deaths of his friends at the hands of the Lagunas cartel. Darlene forms her own partnership with the KC mob to distribute her heroin while launching addiction treatment centers as laundering fronts. When Cosgrove stalls on approving the clinics, Darlene goes behind his back to make a deal with Frank Jr. to distribute her product. Upon learning of this, an irate Cosgrove storms into Darlene's home and threatens to kill her, but Darlene shoots him dead with a shotgun and has Wyatt bury his body.

=== Nelson ===
Nelson (portrayed by Nelson Bonilla) is a fiercely loyal enforcer for the Navarro cartel who accompanies Helen Pierce to the Ozarks. He carries out most of the cartel's assassinations in the area, including Cade Langmore, the Byrdes' therapist Sue Shelby, and Wendy's brother Ben. He later kills Helen herself under orders from Navarro after she outlives her usefulness to the cartel.

=== Frank Cosgrove Jr. ===
Frank Cosgrove Jr. (portrayed by Joseph Sikora) is Frank Cosgrove's son and a member of the Kansas City mafia. He quickly comes at odds with Ruth over his loan-sharking at the Missouri Belle. After his friends in the mob are murdered by the Lagunas cartel during a drug shipment, a drunken Frank Jr. viciously attacks Ruth, whom he blames for the incident. In response, Marty cuts ties with the KC mob but refuses to have Frank Jr. killed, alienating Ruth. In an attempt to sway Ruth to her side, Darlene tracks down Frank Jr., forces him to apologize for beating Ruth, then shoots him in the genitals. Afterwards, she forms her own partnership with the KC mob, which eventually ends when she kills Frank Sr. Ruth, who has reconciled with Frank Jr., visits him to relay the news of his father's death.

=== Other recurring characters ===
==== Introduced in season 1 ====
- Christopher James Baker as Boyd Langmore, Russ Langmore's brother
- Evan George Vourazeris as Tuck, a young man with developmental disabilities who works part-time at the Blue Cat Lodge and becomes Jonah's first friend in the Ozarks
- Michael Tourek as Ash, an enforcer for the Snells
- Bethany Anne Lind as Grace Young, the wife of Mason Young
- Joseph Melendez as Garcia, an enforcer for Del
- Lindsay Ayliffe as Harry, a funeral home owner

==== Introduced in season 2 ====
- Melissa Saint-Amand as Jade, a stripper who forms a relationship with Sam
- Pedro Lopez as Jorge Mendoza, a member of the Navarro Cartel
- Tess Malis Kincaid as SAC Clay, Petty's and Miller's FBI boss

==== Introduced in season 3 ====
- Madison Thompson as Erin Pierce, Helen's daughter
- Marylouise Burke as Sue Shelby, the Byrdes' therapist
- Tyler Chase as Tommy Walsh, a Kansas City Mafia member and FBI snitch

==== Introduced in season 4 ====
- Bruno Bichir as Navarro's priest
- Katrina Lenk as Clare Shaw, CEO of Shaw Medical, a prominent Chicago-based pharmaceutical company owned by her family
- CC Castillo as Sheriff Leigh Guerrero, the acting sheriff in the Ozarks
- Eric Ladin as Kerry Stone, a celebrity chef and high roller at the Missouri Belle who is acquaintances with Ruth
- Bruce Davison as Randall Schafer, a retired Republican Senator with whom Wendy has crossed paths
- Richard Thomas as Nathan Davis, Wendy's estranged and alcoholic father
- Ali Stroker as Charles-Ann, an old friend of Ruth's mother
- Veronica Falcón as Camila Elizondro, Navarro's sister and Javi's mother
