= The Gates (2026 film) =

Film by John Burr

- Theatrical release poster
- Directed by: John Burr
- Written by: John Burr
- Produced by: Nancy Leopardi; Ross Kohn; Gary Glushon
- Starring: Mason Gooding; Algee Smith; Keith Powers; James Van Der Beek
- Cinematography: Ray Huang
- Edited by: Daysha Broadway
- Music by: Jongnic Bontemps
- Production companies: Indy Entertainment; Core 4 Films
- Distributed by: Lionsgate Premiere
- Release dates: February 24, 2026 (Los Angeles); March 13, 2026 (United States)
- Running time: 99 minutes
- Country: United States
- Language: English

The Gates is a 2026 American thriller film starring Mason Gooding, Algee Smith, Keith Powers, James Van Der Beek, Sofia Hublitz, Kylr Coffman, Elle Evans, and Brad Leland. Written and directed by John Burr, the plot follows three friends who witness a murder while driving through a gated community.

The film was produced by Nancy Leopardi, Ross Kohn, and Gary Glushon, with executive producers including Michael Cassutt, J. Todd Harris, Kamala Avila-Salmon, and Mason Gooding, among others.

The film premiered at Los Angeles on February 24, 2026, and was released in the United States on March 13 by Lionsgate Premiere.

== Cast ==
- Mason Gooding as Derek
- Algee Smith as Kevin
- Keith Powers as Tyon
- James Van Der Beek as Jacob, a pastor
- Sofia Hublitz as Roxy
- Kylr Coffman as Officer Bobby
- Elle Evans as Elizabeth
- Brad Leland as Christopher

== Production ==
By late September 2024, principal photography, which took place at Owasso, wrapped. Daysha Broadway edited the film. Jongnic Bontemps composed the score for the film. The film is James Van Der Beek's final film role before his death on February 11, 2026, who portrayed Jacob, a pastor, in the film.

== Release ==
The film premiered at iPic Theaters Westwood in Los Angeles on February 24, 2026, and was released in select theaters across the United States by Lionsgate Premiere on March 13.

== Reception ==
On the review aggregator website Rotten Tomatoes, 48% of 23 critics' reviews are positive, with an average rating of 6/10. Metacritic, which uses a weighted average, assigned the film a score of 44 out of 100, based on five critics, indicating "mixed or average" reviews.

Robert Daniels of RogerEbert.com gave the film two out of four stars and wrote, "Van Der Beek keeps the film interesting and guarded, even when it tries so hard to blurt out its every theme and lesson. So while The Gates itself isn't a total smash, it's a more than sturdy final effort from a beloved actor."
