= Formosa Betrayed (film) =

2009 American political thriller film by Adam Kane

- Directed by: Adam Kane
- Written by: Will Tiao; Katie Swain; Charlie Stratton; Yann Samuell; Brian Askew; Nathaniel Goodman
- Produced by: Will Tiao; Adam Kane; David Cluck
- Starring: James Van Der Beek; Wendy Crewson; John Heard; Will Tiao; Tzi Ma; Leslie Hope; Kenneth Tsang
- Cinematography: Irek Hartowicz
- Edited by: Howard E. Smith
- Music by: Jeff Danna
- Production company: Living Films
- Release dates: July 24, 2009 (New York Asian American FF); February 26, 2010 (United States)
- Running time: 103 minutes
- Country: United States
- Language: English
- Budget: $6 million
- Box office: $225,000

Formosa Betrayed is a 2009 American political thriller film directed by Adam Kane, written by Charlie Stratton, Yann Samuell, Brian Askew and Nathaniel Goodman, with a story by Will Tiao and Katie Swain and starring James Van Der Beek. Set in Chicago and Taiwan in the 1980s, the story follows a Federal Bureau of Investigation (FBI) agent investigating the murder of a Taiwanese professor at a Midwestern college. The search for the killers takes the agent to Taiwan, where he discovers there is more involved in this murder than he ever anticipated. Although Formosa Betrayed has been regarded as a "pan-green movie," its writers say they did not take sides over the Pan-Blue/Pan-Green political divide.

Formosa Betrayed opened in four cities the weekend of February 28, 2010: Boston, New York, Los Angeles, and the Bay Area. Eventually, it was released in 20-25 cities across North America.

== Premise ==
Inspired by two actual events, one surrounding the death of Professor Chen Wen-chen of Carnegie Mellon University in 1981, and the other the 1984 assassination of journalist Henry Liu in California by Chen Chi-li and his fellow Bamboo Union members, Formosa Betrayed is the story of FBI Agent Jake Kelly's (James Van Der Beek) investigation of the murder of Henry Wen (Joseph Foronda), a Taiwanese professor in Chicago. With the help of partner Tom Braxton (John Heard) and a sharp Chicago police detective (Leslie Hope), Agent Kelly discovers that the murderers have fled to Taipei, capital of the Republic of China (Taiwan).

Agent Kelly is sent overseas to assist the Taiwan government's search for the killers. Initially guided by an American diplomat (Wendy Crewson) and a Kuomintang official (Tzi Ma), he soon realizes that not only is he an unwelcome guest in a foreign land but that something more treacherous is happening beneath the surface.

With the help of Ming (Will Tiao), a Taiwanese activist, Agent Kelly discovers the unsettling truth about the island, once described as "Ilha Formosa" ("beautiful island") by Portuguese sailors, leading to dangerous and painful consequences. Agent Kelly finds himself on a collision course with the U.S. State Department, the Chinese Mafia, and ultimately the highest levels of the Kuomintang, where he discovers how a complex web of politics, identity, and power affects the lives and destinies of all the citizens.

== Cast ==
- James Van Der Beek as FBI Agent Jake Kelly
- Wendy Crewson as Susan Kane
- John Heard as Tom Braxton
- Will Tiao as Ming
- Tzi Ma as Kuo
- Leslie Hope as Lisa Gilbert
- Kenneth Tsang as General Tse
- Chelcie Ross as Daltry
- Adam Wang as Lee
- Mintita Wattanakul as Maysing

== Production ==
Filming began in March 2008 in Chicago, Illinois, and then moved overseas to Bangkok, Thailand, and finally Taiwan. Despite the film's events taking place in Taiwan, and in the face of some criticism from Taiwanese communities in America, the production chose to film in Thailand mainly due to its established infrastructure for shooting film and television. The availability of film equipment, crews, and sets offered the production a more cost-effective solution to filming than did Taiwan, where it would have been necessary to ship film equipment in from Japan. The producers also realized that present-day Taiwan no longer resembles Taiwan in the 1980s, so another major production cost relating to set design was avoided by shooting in Thailand.

== Release ==
=== Festival screenings ===
Formosa Betrayed had its world premiere at the Asian American International Film Festival on July 24, 2009, to a completely sold-out theater. The film also screened at the 32nd Annual Montreal World Film Festival where scouts from Screen Media Films first saw the film.

In the rest of 2009, Formosa Betrayed screened at the 8th Annual San Diego Film Festival where the film won Best Film and Best Actor for James Van Der Beek's work. The film was also screened at the 10th Annual DC Asian Pacific American Film Festival, the 13th Annual Hollywood Film Festival, the 33rd Annual Sao Paulo Film Festival, and the 18th Annual St. Louis International Film Festival, and was featured as the centerpiece presentation at the 2nd Annual Philadelphia Asian American Film Festival, where it was honored with the festival's Audience Award.

=== Special screening for United States Members of Congress ===
On September 14, 2009, Formosa Betrayed was screened for members of the United States Congress and their staffs at the Newseum in Washington, D.C. Presented by the Formosa Foundation, Senator Sherrod Brown (D-Ohio), Congresswoman Ileana Ros-Lehtinen (R-Fla.), Congressmen David Wu (D-OR), and Michael McCaul (R-TX) presented remarks. Congressmen Al Green (D-TX) and Gus Bilirakis (R-FL), as well as congressional and professional staff from various House of Representatives and Senate committees, were also in attendance.

Formosa Foundation Executive Director Terri Giles said, "Taiwan's democratization is not a 'miracle,' but rather a result of great human sacrifice by many whose stories inspired the film." Giles added, "This screening is designed to raise awareness among Congressional members of the historic and ongoing struggle of the Taiwanese people to build a democratic society."

"Although the film is set in the 1980s in an era known as the 'White Terror,' its underlying theme of human rights and democracy remains relevant today," producer Will Tiao told the audience. "The film provides a critical analysis of the relationship between the U.S. and Taiwan, as well as current U.S. foreign policy toward this country."

While praising Taiwan for building a prosperous democracy, Senator Brown voiced concern that closer ties with the People's Republic of China could put this progress at risk. "The United States has an interest to help the Taiwanese keep their democracy and freedom," stated Brown.

=== Distribution ===
It was announced on October 29, 2009, that Screen Media Films had acquired worldwide rights in all media to Formosa Betrayed. The film was to be released in theaters in February 2010 in 15-20 North American cities.

=== Reception ===
Formosa Betrayed received mixed reviews upon its release. The review aggregator website Rotten Tomatoes reported that 33% of critics have given the film a positive review based on 30 reviews, with an average rating of 4.99/10. The site's critics consensus reads, "Though the real-life drama it was inspired by could certainly form the basis for a worthwhile political action thriller, Formosa Betrayed isn't it." On Metacritic, the film has a weighted average score of 51 out of 100 based on 13 critics, indicating "mixed or average" reviews.

Blake French of AMC's filmcritic.com praised the film as "a proficient, focused thriller, it begins as a cookie-cutter whodunit and evolves into an informative, interesting interpretation of the complex Taiwan-China relationship." He goes on to describe director Adam Kane's handling of the film as "directed with skill and precision, Formosa Betrayed never feels like a heavy-handed history lesson, mostly because Kane treats the film like a thriller, not as a political drama."

Tim Cogshell of Boxoffice Magazine remarked on the "exceptional" work of Tiao and all the Asian actors in the cast.

The Wall Street Journal said "the movie is a sturdy entry in the paranoid-thriller genre, and raises some interesting issues about our relationship with the country we used to call China."

Slant Magazine commended the movie for its in-depth view into international politics stating "Though it's set in 1983, Formosa Betrayed's an appropriate movie for America's current political climate, in which the audacity of hope has turned into a self-involved kind of frustration and despair."

The Hollywood Reporter placed value on its historical significance: "At its plainspoken best, the U.S.- and Thailand-shot film is an eye-opening history lesson more than an atmospheric thriller. It's nonetheless chilling as it exposes the machinations between countries with no official relationship." The Hollywood Reporter also wrote, "At the heart of the film is the affecting performance of Will Tiao, who also produced and co-wrote the story." His performance represents "the emotional toll on native Taiwanese struggling to be free of foreign control."

The New York Times had great things to say for Wendy Crewson's role, calling it "the film’s strongest performance."

The Boston Globe applauded the film for its unique take on storytelling: "As a political thriller, Formosa Betrayed has enough suspense and intrigue to pull viewers along willingly. It doesn’t try too hard, which is refreshing."

The San Francisco Chronicle had a lukewarm review, citing "viewers with a passionate interest in the political history of Taiwan are probably the main audience for Formosa Betrayed. Others will find a competently made but heavy-handed film that's almost sure to remind them of TV fare."

The Los Angeles Times saw it as "a mostly pedestrian political thriller ... sans thrills".
