= Carters Get Rich =

2017 British TV series

- Genre: Sitcom
- Written by: Claire Downes; Stuart Lane; Ian Jarvis
- Directed by: Chris Cottam
- No. of seasons: 1
- No. of episodes: 6

Production
- Executive producer: Ash Atalla
- Producer: Alexander Smith
- Production company: Roughcut TV

Original release
- Network: Sky 1
- Release: 31 March – 5 May 2017

Carters Get Rich is a 2017 British sitcom that aired on Sky 1. The show follows the exploits of the Carter family after 11-year-old Harry creates an app that sells for £10 million. The show stars James Van Der Beek as the American billionaire who buys the app. The show was written by Claire Downes, Stuart Lane, and Ian Jarvis. The series ran consisted of six episodes; the first episode aired 31 March 2017.

== Cast ==
- Rhashan Stone as Tony Carter, father of the family. He drives a van for the elderly in Milton Keynes, and is determined to ensure that their new-found wealth doesn't change the family's working-class values.
- Kerry Godliman as Liz Carter, mother of the family. She is a house-wife who makes a series of lavish purchases with the money.
- Rio Chambers as Harry Carter, the Carters' 11-year-old son. He is a child genius who creates Honc, a phone app that helps geeky kids like him talk to girls.
- Rhianna Merralls as Ellie Carter, Harry's big sister. She is a literal thinker who has a funny way of looking at things.
- James Van Der Beek as Trent Zebriski, the owner and CEO of a multinational tech corporation who takeover Honc. Trent clashes with Tony as he attempts to become a father-figure in Harry's life to protect his investment.
- John Finnemore as Oliver Campbell-Legg, an assistant of Trent's firm who is assigned to the Carter family following the purchase of Honc. He is an upper-class man who has to adapt to his new life in Milton Keynes, and is rather inept at his job.
- Alice Lowe as Sue Golding, the mother of a friend of Harry's. She sues the Carters, falsely claiming that her son had a hand in the creation of Honc. She is manipulative, attempting to seduce Tony to benefit their position in the civil case.

== Episodes ==
No.	Title	Directed by	Written by	Original release date
1	"The Launch"	Chris Cottam	Claire Downes, Stuart Lane and Ian Jarvis	31 March 2017
2	"Bad Press"	Chris Cottam	Paul Doolan, Claire Downes, Stuart Lane and Ian Jarvis	7 April 2017
3	"Value of Money"	Chris Cottam	Claire Downes, Stuart Lane and Ian Jarvis	14 April 2017
4	"Trent vs Tony"	Chris Cottam	Abi Wilson	21 April 2017
5	"Bonding Time"	Chris Cottam	Paul Doolan	28 April 2017
6	"Co-Creator"	Chris Cottam	Claire Downes, Ian Jarvis, Stuart Lane and Paul Doolan	5 May 2017
