= James Van Der Beek =

American actor (1977–2026)

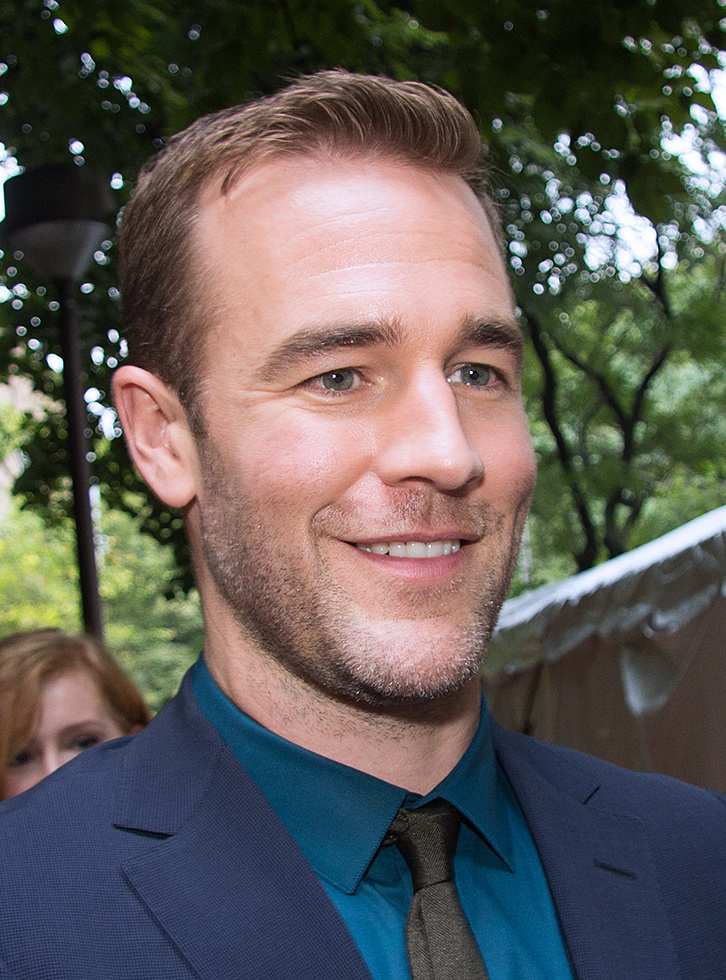
- Van Der Beek in 2013
- Born: March 8, 1977; Cheshire, Connecticut, U.S.
- Died: February 11, 2026 (aged 48); Austin, Texas, U.S.
- Occupation: Actor
- Years active: 1992–2026
- Spouses: Heather McComb (m. 2003; div. 2010); Kimberly Brook (m. 2010)
- Children: 6

James David Van Der Beek (/ˈvændərˌbiːk/; March 8, 1977 – February 11, 2026) was an American actor. Known for his portrayal of Dawson Leery on The WB's Dawson's Creek (1998–2003), he also played a fictionalized version of himself on the ABC sitcom Don't Trust the B— in Apartment 23 (2012–2013), starred as FBI agent Elijah Mundo on CSI: Cyber (2015–2016) and appeared as Matt Bromley during the first season of the FX drama Pose (2018).

Van Der Beek's film credits included Varsity Blues (1999), Texas Rangers (2001), The Rules of Attraction (2002), The Plague (2006), Formosa Betrayed (2009), Labor Day (2013) and Bad Hair (2020).

== Early life ==
James David Van Der Beek was born on March 8, 1977, in Cheshire, Connecticut, the eldest of three children of Melinda (née Weber; 1950–2020), a dancer and gymnastics teacher, and James William Van Der Beek, a cell phone company executive.

== Career ==
=== Theatre ===
Van Der Beek played the role of Reuben in his middle school production of Joseph and the Amazing Technicolor Dreamcoat. At 15, he asked his mother to take him into New York City to find an agent and pursue professional acting. He made his professional debut Off-Broadway at age 16 in 1993, in the New York premiere of Edward Albee's play Finding the Sun with the Signature Theatre Company, playing the role of Fergus. Both he and the production, which was also directed by Albee, received positive reviews.

At 17, while still a student at Cheshire Academy, Van Der Beek performed in the musical Shenandoah at the Goodspeed Opera House, made his feature film debut as Rick Sandford, a sadistic bully, in Angus (1995), and filmed a small role in the independent movie I Love You, I Love You Not (1996). He attended Drew University in Madison, New Jersey, on an academic scholarship from 1995 to 1997, where he studied English and sociology and performed in an all‑male a cappella group, but he left the university when Dawson's Creek began production. In 2024, Van Der Beek returned to be a commencement speaker at Drew where he was awarded an honorary Bachelor of Arts degree. He performed at the Vineyard Theatre in Downtown Manhattan, New York in Nicky Silver's play My Marriage to Ernest Borgnine, and he played a supporting role in the independent film Cash Crop, which was shot in spring of 1997 and originally titled Harvest before its 2001 release.

=== Television and film ===
In early 1997, Van Der Beek auditioned for three television pilots, including one for the WB series Dawson's Creek. He was cast as the title role of Dawson Leery, and the show's 1998 premiere became a breakout success that helped establish the network and its cast. The series ran for six seasons and was syndicated worldwide. In 1999, he starred in the teen football drama Varsity Blues, which held the number-one spot at the U.S. box office for its first two weeks, and he won an MTV Movie Award for Best Male Breakthrough Performance.

Around this time, Van Ber Beek was named one of People magazine's "50 Most Beautiful People in the World", and he appeared in several films, including Texas Rangers, Scary Movie and Jay and Silent Bob Strike Back, in which he played himself playing Jay opposite Jason Biggs as Silent Bob. In 2002, he portrayed Sean Bateman, younger brother of American Psycho protagonist Patrick Bateman (Casper Van Dien), in Roger Avary's film adaptation of Bret Easton Ellis' The Rules of Attraction. The film was a box‑office disappointment but later developed a cult following on DVD.

In 2006, Van Der Beek appeared in the direct-to-DVD thriller The Plague, produced by Clive Barker, which was panned by critics. After Dawson's Creek ended in 2003, he returned to Off-Broadway in Lanford Wilson's Rain Dance. He completed an unproduced screenplay titled Winning and made several television appearances, including a role on Ugly Betty. In 2007, he guest-starred in a two-part episode of Criminal Minds, playing serial killer Tobias Hankel, who kidnaps and drugs Spencer Reid (Matthew Gray Gubler). In 2008, he appeared on How I Met Your Mother as Simon Tremblay, one of Robin Scherbatsky (Cobie Smulders)'s former boyfriends, returning for two more episodes in 2013.

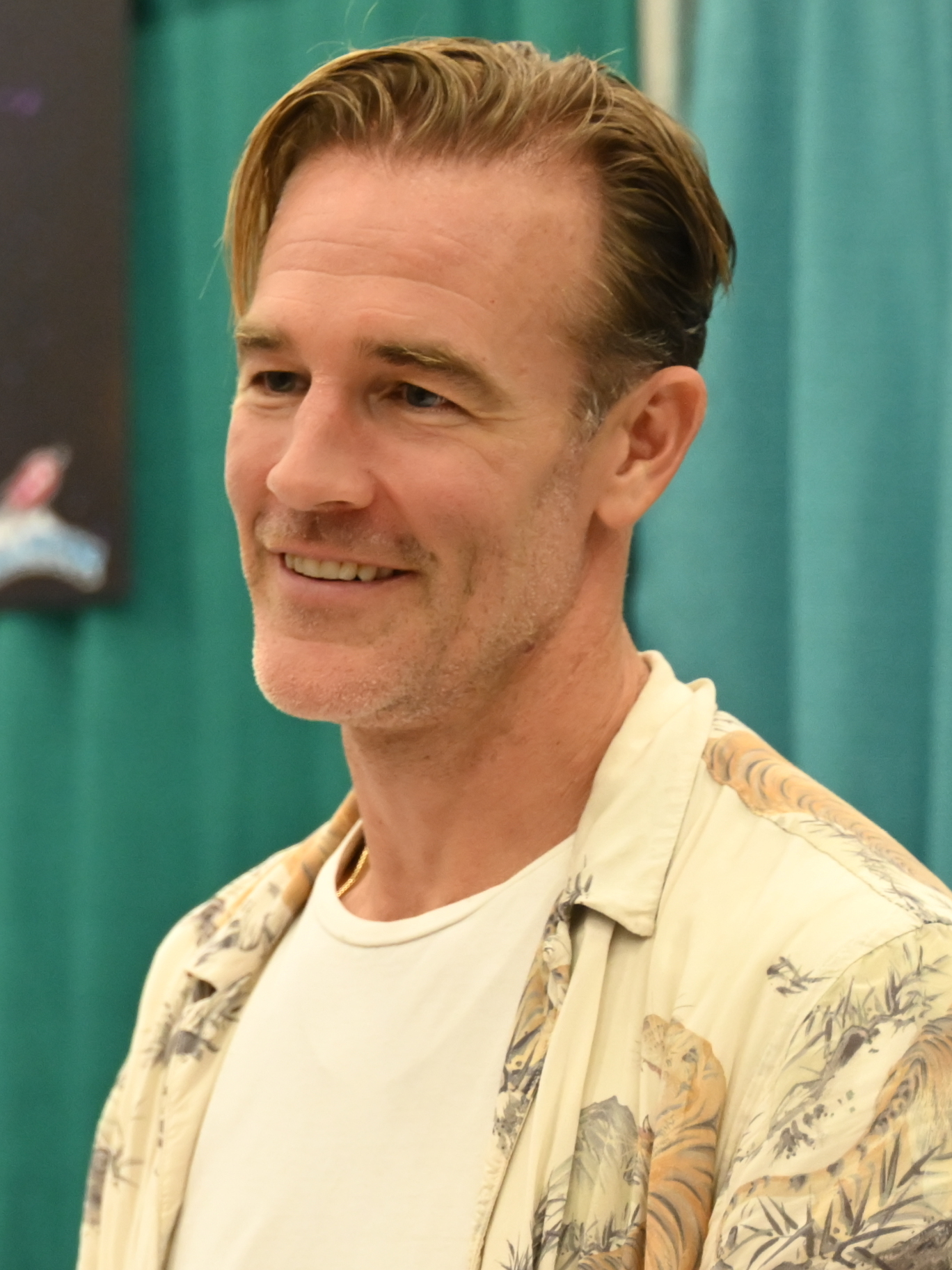
Van Der Beek in 2023

In 2008, Van Der Beek began a recurring role on One Tree Hill as Adam Reese, a filmmaker who served as a satirical opposite of Dawson Leery. He appeared in an episode of the fifth season of Medium. In 2009, he portrayed real‑life kidnapper Anthony Steven "Tony Zappa" Wright in the Lifetime film Taken in Broad Daylight. Also in 2009, he won Best Actor at the 8th Annual San Diego Film Festival for his performance as FBI agent Jake Kelly in the political thriller Formosa Betrayed, which also won Best Picture. The film received a U.S. theatrical release on February 26, 2010. On January 5, 2010, TV Guide reported that Van Der Beek had been cast in a major recurring role on the NBC medical drama Mercy, playing Dr. Joe Briggs, the new womanizing ICU chief with a dark secret. He also appeared in the thriller Stolen, starring Rhona Mitra, Josh Lucas and Jon Hamm. In 2011, Van Der Beek played Kesha's nemesis in her music video for "Blow". He then portrayed a fictionalized version of himself on the ABC sitcom Don't Trust the B— in Apartment 23. The show debuted to critical praise, with Van Der Beek receiving acclaim for his comic timing and self‑parody.

From 2015 to 2016, Van Der Beek played the role as Senior Field Agent Elijah Mundo on CSI: Cyber. In 2017, he appeared in the British comedy series Carters Get Rich. He made a cameo in the film Downsizing (2017), starring Matt Damon, and voiced Boris Hauntley in the Disney Junior series Vampirina. Van Der Beek co‑created, wrote, produced, and starred in What Would Diplo Do?, portraying producer and DJ Diplo. He was also a showrunner for the series. The show premiered on Viceland to positive reviews both for the writing and his performance, was described, "The Veep of DJ Culture" by the Los Angeles Times and received a 90% rating on Rotten Tomatoes. In 2019, Van Der Beek was cast as Matt Bromley on the FX drama Pose, a role he played for one season.

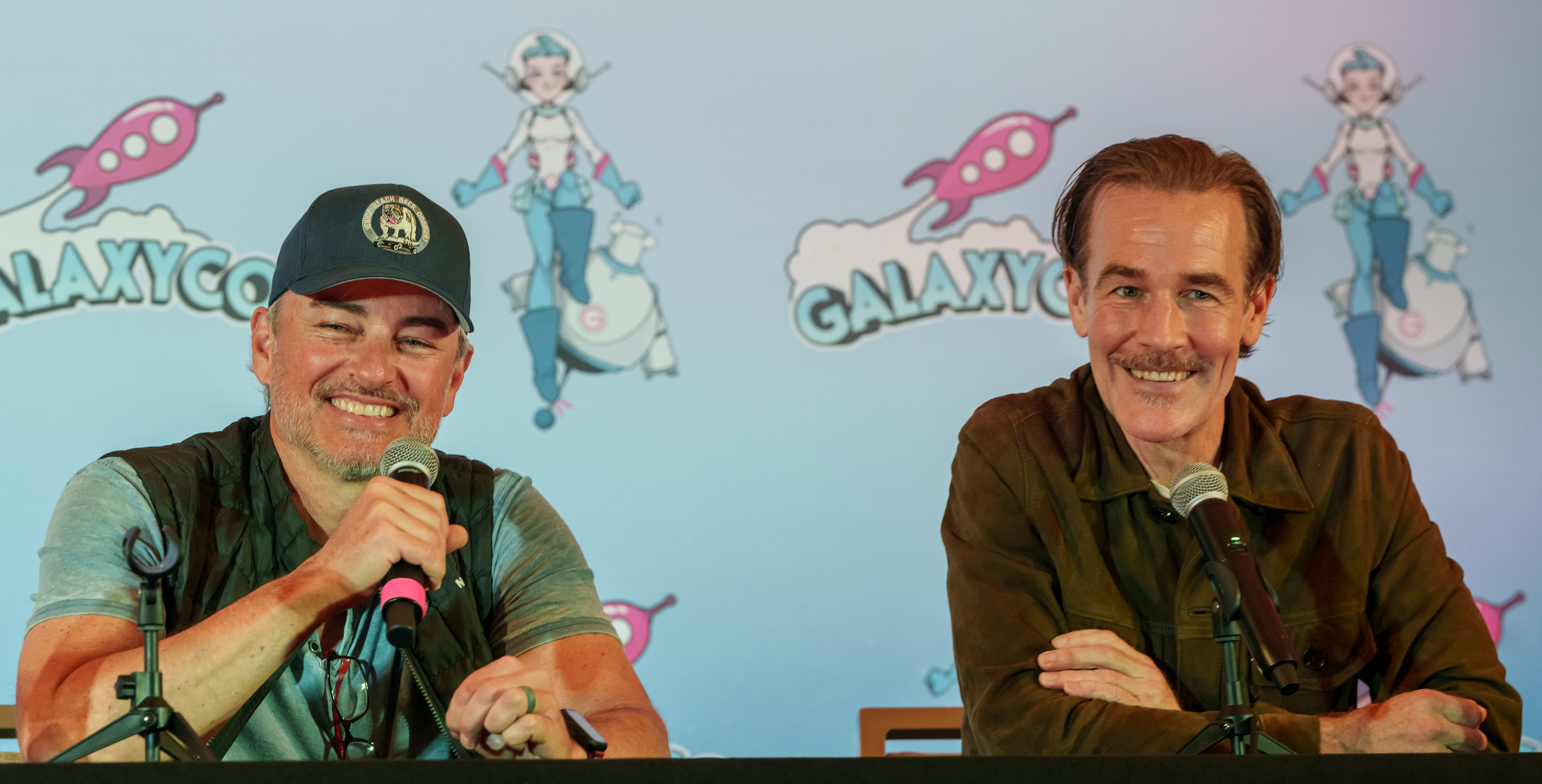
Van Der Beek with Kerr Smith at GalaxyCon in Oklahoma City, 2025

He joined the cast of the 28th season of Dancing with the Stars, partnered with professional dancer Emma Slater. A strong performer, he consistently placed near the top of the leaderboard and was widely considered a frontrunner until his elimination in the semifinals, finishing in fifth place. That night, he revealed that his wife, Kimberly Brook, had suffered a miscarriage two days earlier. His elimination, following the judges' lowest score of the night, was controversial among fans.

In 2025, Van Der Beek competed on season thirteen of The Masked Singer as "Griffin", whose costume featured wings that opened during performances. Clues referenced his illness. He was eliminated in the "Group B Finals: Grand Ole Opry Night," and host Nick Cannon surprised him by bringing his wife Brook and their children onstage. In 2026, he posthumously appeared in John Burr's feature film The Gates by Lionsgate Premiere, and the Legally Blonde prequel television series Elle.

== Personal life ==
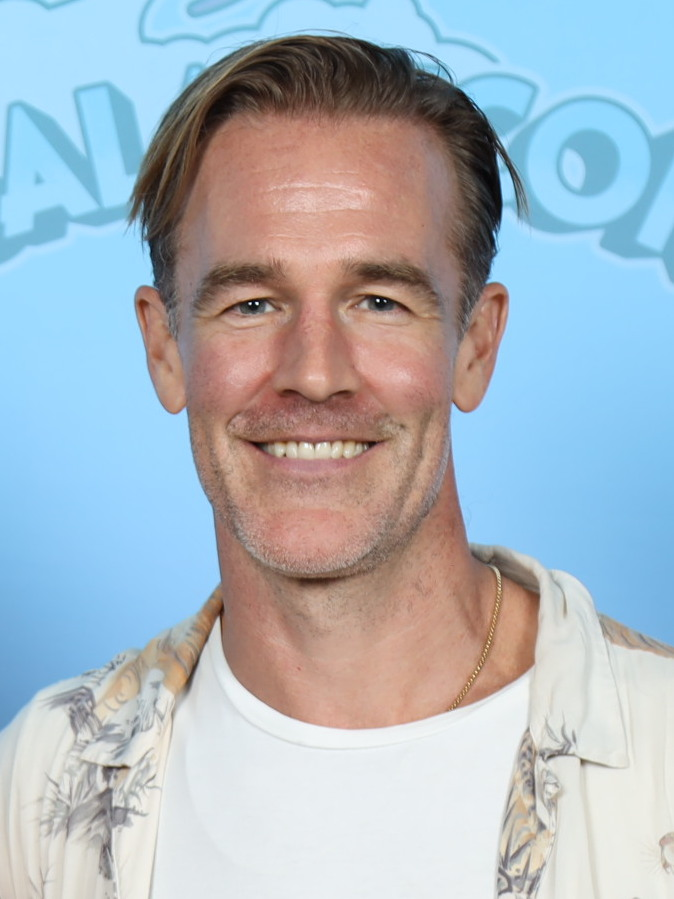
Van Der Beek at GalaxyCon Austin in September 2023

Van Der Beek was married to actress Heather McComb from 2003 until their separation in April 2009. He filed for divorce later that year, and the divorce was finalized in 2010.

Van Der Beek married business consultant Kimberly Brook on August 1, 2010, in a small ceremony at the Kabbalah Center near Dizengoff Square in Tel Aviv, Israel. The couple had six children. He spoke several times about a miscarriage Brook suffered in November 2019, just a month after announcing she was pregnant. On November 22, 2021, following the birth of their sixth child, he disclosed that she had actually suffered two miscarriages at 17 weeks or later. In September 2020, Van Der Beek announced that they were leaving Los Angeles and moving to Texas. At the time of his death, he and his family rented a 36-acre farm in Spicewood, Texas.

== Illness and death ==
On August 31, 2023, Van Der Beek was diagnosed with stage III colorectal cancer; he did not make his diagnosis public until November 2024. He stated that he had "been privately dealing with this diagnosis and has been taking steps to resolve it" with the support of his family. Van Der Beek is stated to have attempted alternative, holistic options to treat the cancer alongside utilizing standard medicine. In November 2025, he announced that he would be auctioning items from Dawson's Creek and Varsity Blues to help cover costs associated with his cancer treatment.

In early February 2026, Van Der Beek and his wife renewed their wedding vows. He died on February 11, at the age of 48. Following his death, a GoFundMe campaign was launched to support his family following the financial impact of his medical expenses; as of February 17, 2026, it had raised more than $2.6 million. On February 13, Fox announced that it would re-air the 2024 television special The Real Full Monty in his honor on February 18. During the broadcast, a QR code was displayed to encourage viewers to donate to the Colorectal Cancer Alliance.

== Filmography ==
=== Television ===
Year	Title	Role	Notes
1993	Clarissa Explains It All	Paulie	Episode: "Alter Ego"
1995	As the World Turns	Stephen Anderson	3 episodes
1996	Aliens in the Family	Ethan	Episode: "You Don't Have a Pet to Be Popular"
1998–2003	Dawson's Creek	Dawson Leery	Main cast; 122 episodes
1999	Saturday Night Live	Himself (host)	Episode: "James Van Der Beek/Everlast"
2006	Robot Chicken	Various voices	2 episodes
2007	Criminal Minds	Tobias Hankel / Raphael	2 episodes
2007	Ugly Betty	Luke Carnes	Episode: "Grin and Bear It"
2007	Eye of the Beast	Dan Leland	Television film
2008–2009	One Tree Hill	Adam Reese	4 episodes
2008–2013	How I Met Your Mother	Simon Tremblay	3 episodes
2009	Medium	Dylan Hoyt	Episode: "All in the Family"
2009	The Storm	Dr. Jonathan Kirk	Miniseries; 2 episodes
2009	The Forgotten	Judd Shaw	Episode: "Lucky John"
2009	Taken in Broad Daylight	Anthony Steven "Tony Zappa" Wright	Television film
2009	Mrs. Miracle	Seth Webster	Television film
2010	Mercy	Dr. Joe Briggs	10 episodes
2011	Law & Order: Criminal Intent	Rex Tamlyn	Episode: "To the Boy in the Blue Knit Cap"
2011	Franklin & Bash	Nathan Connor	Episode: "Bachelor Party"
2011	Salem Falls	Jack St. Bride	Television film
2012	Law & Order: Special Victims Unit	Sean Albert	Episode: "Father Dearest"
2012–2013	Don't Trust the B— in Apartment 23	James Van Der Beek	Main cast; 26 episodes
2013	The Eric Andre Show	James Van Der Beek / Team Go! Member #2	Episode 2 : "James Van Der Beek / Steve-O", "Lauren Conrad / Reese Witherspoon"
2014	Friends with Better Lives	Will Stokes	Main cast; 13 episodes
2015–2016	CSI: Cyber	Elijah Mundo	Main cast; 31 episodes
2017	Carters Get Rich	Trent Zebrisky	Main cast; 2 episodes
2017	What Would Diplo Do?	Diplo	Main cast; 5 episodes. Also co-creator and writer
2017	Room 104	Scott	Episode: "Pizza Boy"
2017	Modern Family	Bo Johnson	Episode: "No Small Feet"
2017	Drop the Mic	Himself	Episode: "James Van Der Beek vs. Randall Park / Gina Rodriguez vs. Rob Gronkowski"
2017–2021	Vampirina	Boris Hauntley (voice)	Main cast; 69 episodes
2018	Pose	Matt Bromley	Main cast; 5 episodes
2019	Dancing with the Stars	Himself	Contestant (season 28)
2020	25 Words or Less	Himself	6 episodes
2020	Home Movie: The Princess Bride	Prince Humperdinck	Episode: "Chapter Nine: Have Fun Storming the Castle!"
2024	We Are Family	Himself	Season finale; with oldest daughter Olivia
2024	The Real Full Monty	Himself	Television special
2024	Walker	New Neighbor	Episode: "See You Sometime"
2025	The Masked Singer	Himself / Griffin	Contestant (season 13)
2025	Overcompensating	Charlie	2 episodes
2026	Elle	Dean Wilson	Recurring role (season 1); posthumous release

=== Film ===
Year	Title	Role	Notes
1995	Angus	Rick Sandford	
1996	I Love You, I Love You Not	Tony	
1998	Harvest	James Peterson	
1999	Varsity Blues	Jonathon "Mox" Moxon	
2000	Scary Movie	Dawson Leery	Uncredited
2001	Texas Rangers	Ranger Lincoln Rogers Dunnison	
2001	Jay and Silent Bob Strike Back	Himself	
2002	The Rules of Attraction	Sean Bateman	
2003	Castle in the Sky	Pazu (voice)	English dub produced in 1998 by Disney
2005	Standing Still	Simon	
2006	The Plague	Tom Russell	Direct-to-video
2007	Final Draft	Paul Twist	
2009	Formosa Betrayed	Jake Kelly	
2009	Stolen	"Diploma" / Roggiani	
2010	The Big Bang	Adam Nova	
2012	Backwards	Geoff	
2013	The Magic Bracelet	Joe	Short film
2013	Labor Day	Officer Treadwell	
2015	Power/Rangers	Rocky DeSantos / Red Ranger	Short film; also screenwriter
2017	Downsizing	Anesthesiologist	
2019	Jay and Silent Bob Reboot	Himself	
2020	Bad Hair	Grant Madison	
2024	Sidelined: The QB and Me	Leroy Lahey	
2025	Sidelined 2: Intercepted	Leroy Lahey	
2026	The Gates	Jacob	Posthumous release

== Awards and nominations ==
MTV Movie Awards

Year	Nominee / work	Award	Result
1999	Varsity Blues	Best Breakthrough Male Performance	Won
2001	Scary Movie	Best Cameo in a Movie	Won

Teen Choice Awards

Year	Nominee / work	Award	Result
1999	Dawson's Creek	Choice TV Actor Drama	Nominated
1999	Varsity Blues	Choice Movie Breakout Star	Won
2012	Don't Trust the B— in Apartment 23	Choice TV: Male Scene Stealer	Nominated

Blockbuster Entertainment Awards

Year	Nominee / work	Award	Result
2000	Varsity Blues	Favorite Actor – Newcomer (Internet Only)	Nominated

San Diego Film Festival

Year	Nominee / work	Award	Result
2009	Formosa Betrayed	Best Actor	Won

NewNowNext Awards

Year	Nominee / work	Award	Result
2011	JamesVanDerMemes.com	OMG Internet Award	Won
