= Hunting Season (2025 film) =

- Theatrical release poster
- Directed by: RJ Collins
- Written by: Adam Hampton
- Produced by: Eduard Osipov; Eric Brenner; Vince Jolivette; David McCalib Jr. Dan Katzman; Al Bravo; Luke Wyckoff
- Starring: Mel Gibson; Shelley Hennig; Sofia Hublitz; Jordi Mollà
- Cinematography: Brandon Cox
- Edited by: Magnus Hall; Hakan Karlsson
- Music by: Anders Niska; Klas Wahl
- Distributed by: Samuel Goldwyn Films
- Release date: December 5, 2025
- Running time: 100 minutes
- Country: United States
- Language: English

Hunting Season is a 2025 American action thriller film written by Adam Hampton, directed by RJ Collins and starring Mel Gibson.

It follows a reclusive survivalist and his daughter who, after rescuing a mysterious, wounded woman, become entangled in a deadly web of violence and revenge, forcing them to confront a brutal criminal gang to survive.

The film received poor approval rating on the review aggregator website Rotten Tomatoes.

== Plot ==
Alejandro, undercover for his cartel, arrives in a bar where a waitress serves him a beer with a tequila chaser. He asks her to sit down after asking if she know someone named Jenson. At first blush she claims no knowledge but when he says he knows that she is his girlfriend she opens up about him. Alejandro is tracking him for the cartel to straighten out accounts after he left from his position within the cartel. Rugged loner, Bowdrie "Bo", lives a quiet life in the remote woods of Oklahoma with his quick-witted teenage daughter, Tag, who was raised off the grid following her mother's death when she was three. One morning while out fishing, Tag discovers a badly injured woman in the river who has been shot and left for dead. Despite Bo's instincts to remain uninvolved, they take her in and tend to her wounds.

When the girl recovers in their secluded cabin, they learn her name is January; she and her roommate Lizzie were kidnapped by "the Brotherhood cartel", a gang linked to the violent criminal named Alejandro. They were then tortured for information about Lizzie's boyfriend Jenson, a former associate of the gang, before managing to escape. Bo later discovers Lizzie's dead body in the river further downstream, and they decide to keep January hidden. Jenson is captured and tortured by the cartel, and his wife and daughter are held hostage. Meanwhile, January is spotted near town by an informant, who tells Alejandro she is still alive. Two men arrive at the cabin and enquire about January's whereabouts; Bo denies any knowledge of her. They later return and Bo kills them both, burning their bodies and taking their truck to the nearby quarry. Knowing January isn't safe at the cabin, Bo confides in his longtime friend and the town's sheriff, Brake. Brake offers to drive January out of the county, and Bo and Tag bid their goodbyes to her.

The following morning when Bo tries to contact Brake, he is unreachable. Bo runs into a man named Davenport, one of Alejandro's men, who tells him Brake is dead due to his involvement. Bo later kidnaps Davenport and tortures him in his garage with a lawnmower until he reveals where the cartel reside, believing January to be there. Bo leaves Tag a letter telling her how much she means to him and revealing her mother isn't dead, but has been in prison for many years for "doing some horrible things"; he tells Tag he lied to protect her. Bo arrives at the cartel's compound with Davenport as his hostage. A gunfight breaks out and Bo is outnumbered by the Brotherhood, but Tag arrives and begins shooting the men from afar. Inside, Bo finds January alive, along with Jenson's wife and daughter, but is cornered by Alejandro who prepares to execute him. Tag shoots Alejandro from behind with a rifle, killing him instantly, and the pair embrace.

One month later, January has fully recovered and moves out of the cabin. Bo later drives Tag into town so she can reunite with her mother, who has now been released from prison and Bo feels she is ready to meet.

== Cast ==
- Mel Gibson as Bowdrie
- Shelley Hennig as January
- Sofia Hublitz as Tag
- Jordi Mollà as Alejandro
- Scarlet Rose Stallone as Lizzie

== Release ==
The film was released on December 5, 2025.

== Reception ==
The film has a 53% approval rating on the review aggregator website Rotten Tomatoes, based on 15 reviews.

Julian Roman of MovieWeb awarded the film three stars out of five.

Chris Bumbray of JoBlo.com gave the film a mixed review and wrote: “Hunting Season isn’t awful, and Collins does the best he can with the material, but there’s no denying that were Gibson not the star, it would be immediately disposable.”

Frank Scheck of The Hollywood Reporter gave the film a positive review and wrote that Gibson's "charisma keeps the formulaic movie afloat, while director Collins displays a flair for action scenes…"
