= List of Dawson's Creek episodes =

American TV series episodes

Dawson's Creek is an American television series that premiered on January 20, 1998, on television network The WB. It was created by Kevin Williamson, who was the executive producer until the end of the show's second season. Paul Stupin shared the executive producer role until Williamson left, and remained until the series finale along with Tom Kapinos and Greg Prange. It is produced by Outerbanks Entertainment and Sony Pictures Television.

The series stars James Van Der Beek as Dawson Leery, an aspiring filmmaker. Katie Holmes and Joshua Jackson portray his childhood friends Joey Potter and Pacey Witter, respectively. Michelle Williams plays Jen Lindley, the new girl to Capeside from New York City. Kerr Smith plays Jack McPhee, a teen who struggles with his sexuality; Meredith Monroe plays overachiever Andie McPhee; and Busy Philipps plays Joey's college roommate Audrey Liddell. Rounding out the cast are Mary-Margaret Humes and John Wesley Shipp as Gail and Mitch Leery, Dawson's parents; Nina Repeta as Bessie Potter, Joey's older sister and legal guardian due to their mother's fatal cancer and father's incarceration for blue-collar crime; and Mary Beth Peil as Evelyn "Grams" Ryan, Jen's maternal grandmother and legal guardian in Capeside.

Between January 20, 1998, and May 14, 2003, Dawson's Creek aired for six seasons on the WB, the first season being a mid-season replacement and the following five as regular seasons. 128 episodes were produced over the show's six-year run, and concluded with a two-hour series finale. All six seasons are available on DVD in Regions 1, 2 and 4.

== Series overview ==
Season	Episodes	Originally released	
Season	Episodes	First released	Last released
1	13	January 20, 1998	May 19, 1998
2	22	October 7, 1998	May 26, 1999
3	23	September 29, 1999	May 24, 2000
4	23	October 4, 2000	May 23, 2001
5	23	October 10, 2001	May 15, 2002
6	24	October 2, 2002	May 14, 2003

== Episodes ==
=== Season 1 (1998) ===
"No. overall" refers to the episode's number in the overall series; "No. in season" refers to the episode's number in this particular season. The first season, 13 episodes, ran from January 20, 1998, to May 19, 1998. The episodes were shot in 1997, before the series premiered. The first season takes place during what is approximately the first three months of the characters' sophomore year.

No. overall	No. in season	Title	Directed by	Written by	Original release date	Prod. code	U.S. viewers (millions)
1	1	"Pilot"	Steve Miner	Kevin Williamson	January 20, 1998	100	6.75
Film addict Dawson is making an amateur movie with his friends Pacey and Joey when filming is interrupted by the arrival of beautiful Jen, the granddaughter of Dawson's next-door neighbor. Pacey develops a crush on Tamara Jacobs (Leann Hunley), an older woman he meets at the video shop, but is stunned to discover that she is his new English teacher. As the friends start high school, Joey discovers Dawson's mother, Gail, is having an affair, a fact that neither Dawson or his father, Mitch, know.
2	2	"Dance"	Steve Miner	Kevin Williamson	January 27, 1998	101	8.04
Dawson casts Jen as the new leading lady in his film, but creates a messy off-camera scene during her date at the school dance. Meanwhile, Joey lets Mrs. Leery know she knows about her liaisons and Pacey gets under Tamara's skin with his public flirting. They kiss for a second time.
3	3	"Kiss"	Michael Uno	Rob Thomas	February 3, 1998	102	7.34
While working on the film class's movie, Dawson has a hard time. Meanwhile, his plan to give Jen the "perfect kiss" at the end of his own filming is interrupted when she discovers a secret. Joey is swept away by Anderson Crawford (Ian Bohen), a wealthy boy whose family has docked their sailboat in Capeside. Pacey angles for extra tuition with Tamara and she calls his bluff after class resulting in him admitting he is a virgin and Tamara sending him away.
4	4	"Discovery"	Steve Miner	Jon Harmon Feldman	February 10, 1998	103	6.48
Dawson learns of his mother's affair, and upon discovering that Joey already knew, he turns to Jen for comfort and advice. He regrets doing so when she tells him about her past and the real reason she moved to Capeside. Meanwhile, Pacey reveals to Dawson that he lost his virginity to Ms. Jacobs.
5	5	"Hurricane"	Lou Antonio	Kevin Williamson & Dana Baratta	February 17, 1998	104	8.04
When a major hurricane moves inland, several characters take refuge in the Leery home, where Dawson rages at Jen about her past, and Mitch storms out after Gail confesses to her affair. A tormented Dawson is left to deal with the fallout. Elsewhere, Pacey conducts sabotage as his brother Doug (Dylan Neal) attempts to secure a date with Ms. Jacobs when they are all trapped at her beach house during the hurricane.
6	6	"Baby"	Steve Miner	Story by : Joanne Waters; Teleplay by : Jon Harmon Feldman	February 24, 1998	105	7.34
Another student overhears Pacey and Dawson discussing Pacey's relationship with their English teacher, and within hours the rumors are all around school and the rest of Capeside. Ms. Jacobs and Pacey find themselves in legal trouble before the day is out. Over at Dawson's house, Bessie gives birth to baby Alexander, aided by Joey, Dawson, Jen, and an unlikely ally, Evelyn Ryan.
7	7	"Detention"	Allan Arkush	Mike White	March 3, 1998	106	7.52
Dawson, Pacey, Joey and Jen all wind up spending a Saturday in detention at Capeside High under the supervision of Mrs. Tringle, the school librarian. The day takes on a "Breakfast Club" type air as Abby Morgan (Monica Keena), the school trouble-maker, stirs the pot by initiating a telling game of truth or dare to break up the monotony of the day. Joey's secret longing for Dawson threatens to reveal itself.
8	8	"Boyfriend"	Michael Fields	Story by : Charles Rosin & Karen Rosin; Teleplay by : Jon Harmon Feldman & Dana Baratta	March 10, 1998	107	7.50
Dawson feels the heat when Jen is visited by Billy Conrad (Eion Bailey), an old boyfriend from New York. Elsewhere, a guy creeps on Joey at a beach party and she is almost sexually assaulted, saved only by Pacey's intervention. In the Leery family, tensions between Mitch and Gail reach boiling point as they attempt to rebuild their marriage.
9	9	"Roadtrip"	Steve Robman	Rob Thomas	March 17, 1998	108	7.05
Hoping to get over Jen, Dawson agrees to skip school and join Pacey and Billy on a road trip. The three of them end up in a bar where Dawson finds some emotional clarity. Meanwhile, Jen handles damage control after Joey becomes the subject of a wild rumor at school concerning her having sex with a boy named Warren (Eric Balfour). The two of them join forces to perpetuate an act of revenge for the slander.
10	10	"Double Date"	David Semel	Jon Harmon Feldman	April 28, 1998	110	7.12
A double date finds Jen and Cliff (Scott Foley) joined by Dawson and Mary-Beth (Megahn Perry), whom Dawson asks out solely to make Jen jealous. Pacey and Joey work together on a school project, with a strange turn of events leading Pacey to admit possible feelings he may have for Joey. He later discusses this with Dawson, who is passionately against Pacey pursuing his emotions.
11	11	"The Scare"	Rodman Flender	Mike White	May 5, 1998	109	7.26
Friday the 13th dawns in Capeside, and Dawson plans a séance for the group. While shopping for supplies for the evening, they meet a distressed woman (Jennifer McComb) in the middle of a nasty row with her boyfriend. She accompanies them back to Dawson's house. In addition to being spooked by the woman and the séance, emotions are heightened by the knowledge that a serial killer may be headed towards Capeside.
12	12	"Beauty Contest"	Arvin Brown	Dana Baratta	May 12, 1998	111	7.80
Capeside's annual Miss Windjammer beauty pageant gets turned on its ear when it draws some unexpected contestants. Jen tries to persuade Joey to enter; she is reluctant until she learns the winner receives a $5,000 prize for college tuition. Even more shockingly, Pacey enters, and in the process exposes some hypocrisy.
13	13	"Decisions"	David Semel	Story by : Jon Harmon Feldman; Teleplay by : Mike White & Dana Baratta	May 19, 1998	112	7.89
In the season finale, Dawson and Joey are forced to confront their true feelings. Joey visits her father Mike (Gareth Williams) in prison and debates leaving to go to France. Jen's grandfather dies and she turns to Dawson for comfort; however, the season ends with Dawson and Joey finally kissing.

=== Season 2 (1998–99) ===
The second season ran from October 7, 1998, to May 26, 1999. This season picks up immediately where season one left off and follows the characters through the remainder of their sophomore year.

No. overall	No. in season	Title	Directed by	Written by	Original release date	Prod. code	U.S. viewers (millions)
14	1	"The Kiss"	David Semel	Jon Harmon Feldman	October 7, 1998	201	7.93
After their kiss at the end of season one, Dawson and Joey have doubts about the future of their relationship as Joey is still mulling over plans to go to France. Meanwhile, Pacey plays a trick on new girl Andie, but later finds himself the victim of her revenge trick on him.
15	2	"Crossroads"	Dennie Gordon	Dana Baratta	October 14, 1998	202	7.26
Dawson violates Joey's privacy by reading her journal. Dawson unreasonably gets upset about what he finds, and forgets Pacey's 16th birthday. Andie gets her brother Jack a job at the Icehouse. Meanwhile, Abby and Jen start to bond. Jen tells her that she's still in love with Dawson and wants to win him back.
16	3	"Alternative Lifestyles"	David Semel	Mike White	October 21, 1998	203	7.75
An economics class project pairs Dawson and Jen as husband and wife, Pacey and Andie as a married couple and Joey as a single mother with two children. Jen tries to use the project to get closer to Dawson. Pacey gets to know more about Andie's troubled family life and Joey begins to see that she has a chance of success in the real world while doing her project solo.
17	4	"Tamara's Return"	Jesus Trevino	Mike White	October 28, 1998	204	5.96
Tamara Jacobs, who left town after the news of her relationship with Pacey was exposed, shares an awkward reunion with her former lover. The encounter triggers old emotions in Pacey and curiosity in Andie, who sheepishly confesses to Dawson that she has feelings for Pacey. Meanwhile, Jack and Joey bond over their shared interest in art.
18	5	"Full Moon Rising"	David Semel	Dana Baratta	November 4, 1998	205	5.88
Parental problems cast a shadow over Dawson and Joey's new romance. Pacey is troubled when he learns of the McPhees' home life: mother Andrea (Caroline Kava) is undergoing a full psychotic break in denial over the death of oldest son Tim, while their father stays away at work. Pacey struggles to comfort Andie when she unloads her emotions onto him. Jen has a date with an older man (Joe Flanigan) that makes Abby jealous. Joey and Jack share a late night kiss.
19	6	"The Dance"	Lou Antonio	Jon Harmon Feldman	November 11, 1998	206	6.95
Two tragedies rock Dawson's world. First he learns the awful truth about his parents' marriage. Then, at the Homecoming dance, he witnesses a heated moment between Joey and Jack, during which their illicit kiss is revealed. Dawson is heartbroken as his lifelong friendship and newfound romance with Joey is shattered. The big night also introduces Jen and Jack for the first time. Something Andie witnesses ends up hurting her, and Pacey tries to open his heart to her.
20	7	"The All-Nighter"	David Semel	Greg Berlanti	November 18, 1998	207	6.42
Facing the scariest English test of their lives, the gang has an all night study session at the home of the wealthy and horny Chris Wolfe (Jason Behr). During the night, secrets are revealed and friendships are altered. The truth about Pacey's "affair" with Tamara is publicly revealed, much to Andie's horror. Dawson and Joey discuss their relationship.
21	8	"The Reluctant Hero"	Joe Napolitano	Shelley Meals & Darin Goldberg	November 25, 1998	208	6.76
Joey's "semi-date" with Jack prompts a resentful Dawson to join Jen at a party where he stops her from doing some things she'll regret. Pacey proves his worth when Andie's mother has an episode during their study session. Mitch fails to understand Dawson's views on their divorce.
22	9	"The Election"	Patrick Norris	Darin Goldberg & Shelley Meals	December 16, 1998	209	6.62
Andie's decision to run for student council takes a dark turn when Abby begins advertising her family situation. Jen helps Dawson take steps to deal with his powerlessness over his parents' divorce and tries to teach him how to be a teenager. Jack shuts out Joey during a family crisis.
23	10	"High Risk Behavior"	James Whitmore, Jr.	Jenny Bicks	January 13, 1999	210	6.80
Epic tryouts for Dawson's new movie prompt a steamy dialogue between him and Jen that could recast her role in his love life. Jack poses nude for Joey's art project, which prompts an intimate moment between the two of them. Pacey sets out to give Andie her dream date and to make their night truly memorable. Andie collects her anti-anxiety medication and lies to Pacey that it's for her mother.
24	11	"Sex, She Wrote"	Nick Marck	Mike White & Greg Berlanti	January 20, 1999	211	6.43
Abby and Chris find an anonymous note at school, revealing that one of three class couples featured in the previous episode ended the night by having sex. Abby sets out to expose the affair. Working from clues about Joey's night of nude sketching with Jack, Dawson's steamy stop over at Jen's, and Pacey's bed and breakfast trip with Andie, Abby calls together her list of suspects and reveals the dirty secrets of Capeside. Jen is furious and berates Abby for her endless cruelty to other people.
25	12	"Uncharted Waters"	Scott Paulin	Dana Baratta & Mike White	January 27, 1999	212	6.16
The gang explores uncharted waters when Dawson and Pacey go on a father-son fishing trip with Mitch Leery and Pacey's critical and abusive father, Chief John Witter (John Finn), who uses the trip to tell Pacey how useless he is. But tensions really begin to rise when Pacey invites Jack along, who tries to make amends with a reluctant Dawson. Meanwhile, Jen, Joey, Andie and Abby spend a day with Gail doing a report on teenage girls in the consumer world, with Abby naturally not passing up the opportunity to insult and provoke conflicts and tension between Mrs. Leery and the girls.
26	13	"His Leading Lady"	David Semel	Shelley Meals & Darin Goldberg	February 3, 1999	213	6.19
The filming of Dawson's new movie, Creek Times, brings back memories for the filmmaker and for Joey, who grows to dislike the actress playing her, Devon (Rachael Leigh Cook). Andie's emotions are running high and she attempts to break up with Pacey, who refuses to let her dump him. Dawson begins to bond with Jack.
27	14	"To Be or Not to Be..."	Sandy Smolan	Greg Berlanti	February 10, 1999	214	6.84
In a compelling two-part episode, the Capeside High School gossip mill kicks into overdrive after Jack submits a poem for English class and is humiliated when the teacher, Mr. Peterson (Edmund Kearney), forces him to read it aloud; the poem could be interpreted as alluding to feelings that Jack may have towards another boy. Dawson, Joey, and Andie are shaken by the implications. Meanwhile, Pacey tries to defend Jack from Mr. Peterson, and he spits in his face and gets suspended. Jen finds her latest suitor, Tyson "Ty" Hicks (Eddie Mills), is full of surprises. Jack later tells Joey that the poem meant nothing sexual and that it may have been about his deceased brother.
28	15	"...That Is the Question"	Greg Prange	Kevin Williamson & Greg Berlanti	February 17, 1999	215	6.93
On Dawson's advice, Joey attempts to heal the wounds of her new romance with Jack, which were left exposed by the poem and the resulting innuendo. Jack again reassures her. However, when Jack confronts his innermost secrets, he is forced to confront the fact that he is in fact gay, formally coming out to his supportive sister and less-supportive father (David Dukes). Elsewhere, Pacey takes on Mr. Peterson and challenges his abusive teaching methods. His insistence on making things right in the school alienate Andie, and the two of them must work hard to put their relationship back together.
29	16	"Be Careful What You Wish For"	David Semel	Heidi Ferrer	March 3, 1999	216	6.45
On the night of Dawson's 16th birthday, Dawson and Andie follow her therapist's advice and throw themselves into an unabashed night of recklessness. They arrive at a blues bar, and unbeknownst to Pacey, Andie and Dawson start drinking. Meanwhile, back at the Leery house, Joey is putting together a surprise party for Dawson, and Jack must own up to her about his orientation. Jen and Ty face up to their potentially irreconcilable differences, and Gail and Mitch come to a decision about how to raise their son in light of their separation.
30	17	"Psychic Friends"	Patrick Norris	Dana Baratta	March 10, 1999	217	6.42
Dawson's confidence as a filmmaker is shaken when Ms. Kennedy (Mädchen Amick), the new film teacher, turns out to be a movie studio executive on sabbatical in Capeside, and gives his amateur movie a scathing review. The future is unsure for Joey as well, when a psychic advises her to be open to every new opportunity that crosses her path, including a photoshoot with a handsome photographer (Nick Stabile). Andie also visits the psychic and is told less than positive things about her future.
31	18	"A Perfect Wedding"	Greg Prange	Mike White	April 28, 1999	218	5.26
Joey's father returns to Capeside, prompting Bessie and him to expand the Icehouse to cater weddings. They recruit Andie, who dislikes weddings, and Pacey, who enjoys them. Joey is wary of her father's public presence after his recent release from jail. Dawson empathizes with his mother's loneliness at the wedding, especially when his father arrives with a new date. Jack and Dawson assist a nervous bride, while Andie and Pacey accidentally damage the wedding cake but manage to salvage it. Dawson and Joey reignite their romance amidst the festivities. Jen and Abby crash the wedding but are kicked out by Andie. They later end up at the docks, where Abby tragically drowns after falling into the ocean while intoxicated.
32	19	"Abby Morgan, Rest in Peace"	David Semel	Mike White	May 5, 1999	219	5.25
Abby's unexpected death sends shockwaves through Capeside, despite her unpopularity. Jen's frustration with the community's hypocrisy leads her to question her faith, causing tension with Grams. At Abby's funeral, Jen's speech denouncing God and Abby's influence further strains her relationship with Grams. Memories of Andie's late brother resurface, triggering emotional turmoil for her and concern from Pacey. Andie struggles to reconcile her conflicted feelings while delivering the eulogy at Abby's mother's request. Joey's reluctance to attend the funeral stems from unresolved grief over her mother's death, prompting a visit to her grave with Dawson. Grams' disappointment in Jen's speech leads to a rift between them, prompting Grams to ask Jen to leave.
33	20	"Reunited"	Melanie Mayron	Greg Berlanti	May 12, 1999	220	6.17
Dawson decides to take Joey out to dinner to celebrate their first month together. Mitch Leery also makes reservations at the same restaurant, and when the management fail to realise there are two Leery parties, all four are forced to sit together. Miss Kennedy, Dawson and Joey fight causing Miss Kennedy to leave. Later, Jen (who is now living at the Leery house) arrives with Gail, and she and Joey conspire to get Gail and Mitch together again. Alas, the plan is unsuccessful. Also reunited are Andie and her deceased brother Tim (Scott Denny). Pacey and Jack catch on that she thinks he is with her, but it is just a figment of her imagination. After a showdown with Andie, Jack and Pacey engineer a plan to aid her medical recovery.
34	21	"Ch... Ch... Ch... Changes"	Lou Antonio	Dana Baratta	May 19, 1999	221	5.23
After Andie starts experiencing visions of her deceased brother, Mr. McPhee decides she should seek treatment in Providence rather than Capeside. Andie and Pacey grapple with prioritizing her mental health over their relationship, while Jack faces a similar dilemma. His father's intolerance towards his sexuality influences Jack's decision to support Andie. Meanwhile, Dawson, while filming a documentary on Mr. Potter's transformation from drug dealer to upstanding citizen, inadvertently catches him in a drug deal. Jen reaches out to her mother for support but is disappointed by the response, leading her to move in with Jack. As Andie leaves, Jack and Pacey bid her farewell.
35	22	"Parental Discretion Advised"	Greg Prange	Greg Berlanti	May 26, 1999	222	6.32
Dawson debates whether to confide in Joey about her father's drug dealings. Chief Witter suspects Mr. Potter's return to illegal activities and stakes out the Icehouse. A rival of Mr. Potter sets the restaurant ablaze while the gang studies inside, heightening Dawson's distress. Gail plans to accept a job offer in Philadelphia, prompting Mitch to move back to oversee Dawson. Pacey struggles with depression after Andie's departure, leading to a confrontation with his father. Chief Witter realizes his shortcomings as a father through Pacey's turmoil. Concerned for Jen's well-being, Jack reconciles with her and Grams, leading to a change in living arrangements. Dawson's parents urge him to go to the police about Mr. Potter, but he confides in Joey instead. Joey assists in Mr. Potter's arrest but harbors resentment towards Dawson for his involvement, ending their relationship once again. Absent: Meredith Monroe

=== Season 3 (1999–2000) ===
Season 3 aired from September 29, 1999, to May 24, 2000, and features 23 episodes. This season takes place during the characters' junior year of high school in Capeside. There were several cast changes from season 2. Kerr Smith and Meredith Monroe joined the main cast as Jack and Andie McPhee, respectively. The two had previously held special guest star roles in the previous season with Smith appearing in twenty episodes and Monroe appearing in twenty-one.

No. overall	No. in season	Title	Directed by	Written by	Original release date	Prod. code	U.S. viewers (millions)
36	1	"Like a Virgin"	Greg Prange	Tammy Ader	September 29, 1999	301	6.05
Dawson returns from spending the summer in Philadelphia with his mother, and on the journey home meets a beautiful blonde girl, Eve (Brittany Daniel), who takes a liking to him. He hasn't spoken to Joey all summer. Jen gets an unexpected offer after she stands up to the school's popular crowd. Mitch becomes the new coach of the high school football team, and leaves for a coaching conference. Eve shows very clear interest in Dawson, and he takes her out on Mitch's motorboat with the intent of impressing her; it works, but during a moment of distraction (which is implied to have involved fellatio), he crashes the boat into the docks. Eve, it transpires, is a stripper, and Pacey, who is trying to distract himself while waiting for Andie's return, hatches a plan to host a house party with her co-workers at the Leery residence to raise repair money. Joey takes that moment to return to Dawson's life. She offers herself to Dawson, but he rejects her. Absent: Meredith Monroe
37	2	"Homecoming"	Melanie Mayron	Greg Berlanti	October 6, 1999	302	5.39
As Pacey and Joey leave Capeside to collect Andie from hospital, Dawson is manipulated by his father and the new school principal, Howard Green (Obba Babatunde), to produce a film about football for the upcoming pep rally. However, the ultimate stars of the film, which is seen by many students and teachers, are Dawson and Eve, who inadvertently appear semi-clothed. The same night, Jen is revealed to be the new head cheerleader and Jack, the new star of the football team, two facts which stun Pacey, Joey and Andie, who are watching from the audience. Pacey is overjoyed to be spending time with Andie, but she doesn't appear as excited to see him, and when confronted by her boyfriend, admits to having had a one-night stand with a fellow hospital attendee over the summer. Jack has an unexpected encounter with his father, who has returned to Capeside.
38	3	"None of the Above"	Patrick Norris	Bonnie Schneider & Hadley Davis	October 13, 1999	303	5.83
Dawson is stunned when Eve presents him with an advance copy of the PSAT exam he and his friends will be taking shortly. The entire gang are tempted to cheat for various reasons, and when the test goes missing, it becomes obvious that one friend in particular was unable to resist the temptation. In the quest to discover who stole the paper, Dawson gets into a fight with Pacey, who is still reeling from his break-up with Andie. As the gang takes the exam, the thief is revealed to be Andie, who is desperate to ace the test to prove that she is recovered from her medical problems and stole it with no other character noticing. Elsewhere, Jack is adamant he will be giving up football until a persistent Jen manipulates him into thinking otherwise.
39	4	"Home Movies"	Nick Marck	Jeffrey Stepakoff	October 20, 1999	304	4.92
Mitch and Dawson clash over Gail's offer for Dawson to produce a news report featuring Jack, Capeside's first gay football star, as Mitch worries it may affect the upcoming game. Joey and Pacey receive an unusual punishment for skipping classes together, but Pacey's personal project of restoring a boat helps mend their rift. Andie fears being caught for cheating when Principal Green requests to speak with her. Jen decides to quit as head cheerleader, but faces resistance from her teammates, especially when she's nominated for homecoming queen. To raise funds, the cheerleaders auction off a kiss with Jen, won by innocent freshman Henry Parker, sparking intrigue.
40	5	"Indian Summer"	Lou Antonio	Gina Fattore & Tom Kapinos	October 27, 1999	305	4.34
Dawson grows frustrated with Eve's secrecy about her life in Capeside after catching her breaking into Jen's house. He and Pacey investigate further. Dawson discovers she is not registered at their school. He then steals a photograph from Eve's residence, resulting in her confession that she's searching for her biological mother. Joey distrusts her boss, Rob, because of his constant sexual harassment and eventually he fires her. Jack's attempts to set Jen up with Henry involve deception, and Dawson's visit to the Ryan house unveils a shocking revelation about Eve's connection to Jen's family.
41	6	"Secrets and Lies"	Greg Prange	Greg Berlanti & Alex Gansa	November 10, 1999	306	4.47
Dawson grapples with whether to disclose Eve's truth to Jen, who has already left town. Meanwhile, his mother's return to Capeside sparks curiosity. Jen reluctantly agrees to participate in a homecoming event, persuaded by Henry, who later asks her to be his date. However, Jen rejects his advances, causing tension between them. Dawson accompanies his mother, a former homecoming queen, to the event and discovers her career struggles. Andie reaches out to Joey in distress at a party with Rob, claiming he's crossed a line. Joey and Pacey rescue her, leading to a night spent on Pacey's boat, where Andie misinterprets their relationship. In the morning, Pacey clarifies their status, prompting Andie's disappointment. Rob denies making advances towards Joey, leading to tension between them. Andie accuses Joey of sabotaging her reunion with Pacey but later realizes Joey's innocence, fostering a bond between them. Absent: Kerr Smith
42	7	"Escape from Witch Island"	James Whitmore, Jr.	Tom Kapinos	November 17, 1999	307	5.26
In an effort to add excitement to a dull school project, Dawson decides to make a documentary, enlisting the help of Joey, Pacey and Jen. The group head to a small island near Capeside, rumoured to be haunted by the ghosts of thirteen girls killed in the 17th century after being accused of witchcraft. Joey finds similarities between her own life and that of one of the dead girls, which provokes some deep reflections on her strained relationship with Dawson. After some exploratory conversations, Jen and Pacey make the decision to become friends with benefits. Back at school, Andie gets a little too involved with her role as head of the school disciplinary committee. When Dawson screens his documentary for his class, Joey is forced to again question her opinions about love and happiness. Absent: Kerr Smith
43	8	"Guess Who's Coming to Dinner"	James Charleston	Heidi Ferrer	November 24, 1999	308	4.05
When Jen's mother, Helen, unexpectedly arrives in Capeside to spend Thanksgiving with her mother and daughter, Dawson tells her what he knows about Eve. She asks him not to tell Jen, but a poignant speech at the dinner table forces Helen to think again, and she eventually tells Jen that she has a half-sister. Upset and confused by her mother's confession, Jen attempts to change her relationship with Pacey to the more physical, but finds comfort in another unexpected way. It also allows her to make peace with Helen, as she realizes that her mother's decision to bundle Jen off to Capeside was driven not by distaste for her daughter's conduct, but rather shame over her own poor mothering. Mitch and Gail reveal that their divorce has become final.
44	9	"Four to Tango"	James Whitmore, Jr.	Gina Fattore	December 1, 1999	309	4.37
To secure a college scholarship, Joey enrolls at a local dance school, choosing Pacey as her partner. Pacey, blackmailed into joining by Joey, struggles with his own romantic pursuits, attempting to tryst with Jen but finding no chemistry. Dawson's return leads to misunderstandings, as he mistakes Joey as Pacey's partner due to their dance teacher's remarks about unresolved tension. Eventually, Pacey and Jen acknowledge their lack of chemistry and return to friendship. Meanwhile, Jack seeks to connect with a gay student from another school inspired by Dawson's documentary, with Andie offering both encouragement and solace when things don't go as planned.
45	10	"First Encounters of the Close Kind"	Greg Prange	Leslie Ray	December 15, 1999	310	3.96
Dawson, Joey, Jack, and Andie embark on a weekend trip to a Boston university to explore college life. Dawson faces criticism for his documentary at a student film festival, while Joey forms a connection with English major and Teaching Assistant A.J. Moller. Andie seeks advice for an advanced admissions interview and finds inspiration from an unexpected source, while Jack explores the local gay community and bonds with a returning Capeside resident, Ethan Brody. The weekend ends with the promise of new romances: Joey gives her number to A.J., Jack connects with Ethan, and Dawson encounters another filmmaker, Nikki Green, who happens to be his principal's daughter. Absent: Joshua Jackson, Michelle Williams
46	11	"Barefoot at Capefest"	Jan Eliasberg	Bonnie Schneider & Hadley Davis	January 12, 2000	311	3.42
Dawson experiences an identity crisis when Nikki emerges as filmmaking competition, and Joey experiences her own crisis when Dawson won't open up to her about the pain of his parents' divorce. Meanwhile, Jack's first efforts to hit on Ethan are rebuffed; Pacey and Andie uncomfortably find themselves involved in the same after-school activity (the school's theatre production of Barefoot in the Park) which Pacey agreed to star in exchange for a passing grade in English; and Jen finally sees that she may have passed up the chance at something special with Henry.
47	12	"A Weekend in the Country"	Michael Katleman	Jeffrey Stepakoff	January 19, 2000	312	4.10
Joey's friends and their families come together to support the Potter family's new bed and breakfast venture. Tensions rise when Pacey invites a renowned critic for the opening weekend, leading to unexpected challenges like a malfunctioning furnace. Despite the setbacks, the warmth of their relationships shines through, leading to a positive review from the critic. Meanwhile, Jack and Andie find common ground, leading Jack to move back home. Jen and Henry work through issues, while Dawson seeks to reconnect with his parents. Mitch helps Gail rediscover a forgotten dream of opening a restaurant. Reflecting on his growing closeness with Joey, Pacey keeps watch over her as she sleeps on the couch, showing his care for her.
48	13	"Northern Lights"	Jay Tobias	Gina Fattore	January 26, 2000	313	4.18
Dawson, lacking inspiration, makes the radical move of dropping out of film class to spend some time re-evaluating his life. Back at the bed and breakfast, Joey is torn between attending Pacey's opening night and her date with A.J., who has come to Capeside for the evening. At the play, Andie must take over as director when Mr. Broderick falls ill. Jen agrees to meet Henry, but she throws him another block by bringing Grams as her date.
49	14	"Valentine's Day Massacre"	Sandy Smolan	Tom Kapinos	February 2, 2000	314	3.42
Joey disapproves when Dawson is persuaded by Pacey to attend an illegal Valentine's Day party. Despite her initial reservations, Joey ultimately decides to join the party along with Jack and Andie, accompanied by their childhood friend Kate. The party, hosted by local troublemaker Matt Caulfield, quickly spirals into chaos, leading to the group getting rounded up by Doug and thrown into the drunk tank. They are later rescued by Mitch, except for Pacey. During a heart-to-heart with Doug, Pacey reveals his feelings for Joey for the first time. At the end of the episode, Pacey attempts to broach the topic with Joey but ends up offering her driving lessons instead. Meanwhile, Jen's date with Henry takes a turn for the worse, ending in a trip to the hospital due to Henry's overzealous efforts.
50	15	"Crime and Punishment"	Joe Napolitano	Gina Fattore	February 9, 2000	315	4.38
Joey is selected to paint a mural at school, but it gets vandalized, leading to Pacey taking matters into his own hands and facing consequences. Matt Caulfield is expelled after being identified as the culprit. Andie achieves top scores on her PSAT but feels guilty for cheating and confesses to Principal Green. Pacey's home becomes crowded with his sister and her children, prompting him to consider moving in with Doug. Pacey and Joey's bond strengthens as Dawson inadvertently tests Pacey's genuine care for her. Absent: Michelle Williams
51	16	"To Green, with Love"	Kenneth Fink	Gina Fattore	February 16, 2000	316	4.00
Joey mobilizes her friends to protest Principal Green's forced resignation over Matt Caulfield's expulsion. Gail and Dawson collaborate on a counter-report to challenge biased news coverage, leading to a job offer for Gail, which she declines in favor of pursuing her dream of starting a restaurant. Pacey's growing feelings for Joey prompt him to seek advice from Jen. In an effort to support Joey's creativity, Pacey rents her a public wall for painting. Principal Green stands firm against the school board's orders and upholds Caulfield's expulsion, sacrificing his own job, earning the admiration of Capeside High students as he departs.
52	17	"Cinderella Story"	Janice Cooke-Leonard	Jeffrey Stepakoff	March 1, 2000	317	4.45
Pacey drives Joey to the train station for her date with A.J. in Boston, cautioning her not to get too hopeful. Meanwhile, Jen, Jack, and Andie help out at Dawson and Gail's restaurant. Dawson eventually seeks his father's help, much to his mother's initial resistance. Pacey mentors a young boy named Buzz, seeing similarities to his own past. At the train station, Joey meets A.J.'s friend Morgan, whose love for A.J. is revealed during his reading. Drawing from her own experiences, Joey encourages A.J. to pursue Morgan and ends their relationship. She calls Pacey for a ride back, and he willingly drives through the night. Pacey urges Joey to open up about what went wrong with A.J., leading to a pivotal moment where he expresses his feelings through a kiss.
53	18	"Neverland"	Patrick Norris	Maggie Friedman	April 5, 2000	318	4.11
After their kiss, Joey and Pacey discuss the situation with their siblings. Pacey receives encouragement from Doug and attempts to confess his feelings to Dawson during a camping trip, but they are interrupted. Jen discovers Henry has lied about his birthday party and confronts him, leading to reconciliation. Joey has a girls' night with Jen and Andie, realizing her own confusion. They visit a roller rink where Jen and Henry reconcile. Jack invites Ethan to stay, but his father cancels his trip. Ethan helps Jack reconcile with his father, who canceled to bond with him.
54	19	"Stolen Kisses"	Greg Prange	Tom Kapinos	April 26, 2000	319	4.00
Jen and Henry go through a bumpy time when she is consumed with jealousy over his friendship with waitress Shelley (Sarah Lancaster) at Gail's restaurant. Dawson, Joey, Andie, Pacey and Will Krudski (Rodney Scott), a childhood friend of the gang who has remained close with Pacey (Will appears in two subsequent episodes as an introductory character for Young Americans, a backdoor pilot and spin-off for Dawson's Creek), head to the house of Dawson's Aunt Gwen (Julie Bowen) to spend their school holiday away from Capeside. The trip is filled with tension as Joey and Pacey attempt to fight their feelings. Andie and Will appear to have a connection, and Dawson tries to bond again with Joey, who is preoccupied by her feelings for Pacey. Encouraged by Dawson's aunt, the friends have a karaoke contest. Pacey kisses Joey again and informs her that she must make the next move. At the end of the episode, Joey initiates a kiss with Pacey. Absent: Kerr Smith
55	20	"The Longest Day"	Perry Lang	Gina Fattore	May 3, 2000	320	3.86
The day Pacey and Joey's relationship goes public is played out four times, each time revealing a little more of what happened, a structure inspired by the film Go: As Pacey christens True Love, he promises Joey that he will tell Dawson about their relationship. He encounters Andie and Will at the library, where Will asks advice on asking Andie out on a date. As Pacey goes up the steps to Dawson's house, Joey intercepts him to stop him, and the two get into an argument until Dawson hears them and emerges with questions.; Joey admits how she feels to Jen. She thinks twice when Andie admits Will has asked her out, but Andie cannot agree due to her feelings for Pacey. Dawson asks Joey to join her for a movie night; she finds him watching The Last Picture Show, the film he and Joey watched on their first date, concerning a love triangle. Unnerved by Dawson's commentary, she leaves and intercepts Pacey outside Dawson's house. They get into an argument until Dawson emerges to ask why they are arguing. Dawson reveals that he already knows what they're about to tell him.; Dawson hands Pacey a bottle of champagne with which to christen his boat. At the library, Will asks for advice on staging first dates. Dawson goes to talk to Jen, and she offers sympathy, thinking Joey has told him the truth, which leads Dawson to guess Joey and Pacey are together. He returns home and Joey drops in as he watches The Last Picture Show. When Joey and Pacey get into an argument, Dawson emerges, asks the question, then castigates them for their betrayal.; As Jen hangs out with Henry, Dawson interrupts and she accidentally reveals the situation. Henry seems oblivious to her being upset, and the two fight. Meanwhile, Will and Andie have their first date, but it ends when they stumble upon the argument outside Dawson's house. Andie upbraids Pacey for falling for Joey, whose first love is Dawson.; As the looping perspectives end, Dawson gives Joey an ultimatum: if she continues her relationship with Pacey, she will be ending their friendship. Joey is brokenhearted at losing one of them, but reluctantly ends things with Pacey.
56	21	"Show Me Love"	Morgan J. Freeman	Liz Tigelaar & Holly Henderson	May 10, 2000	321	4.73
Capeside prepares for its annual boat racing regatta. Pacey has entered with Will as his crew and Leery's Fresh Fish, Mitch and Gail's new restaurant, as his sponsor. Dawson decides to compete as well, bringing in Jack and Mitch as his crew and with Potters' Bed and Breakfast as his sponsor. Both Joey and Pacey realize Dawson is trying to make Joey the prize, though Dawson himself is oblivious; during the race, he breaks the rules by cutting off True Love, and is disqualified despite being first across the finish line. Joey scolds him for it, and tells both boys that she is not worth fighting over. After many weeks of deliberating, Gail finally makes things happen with Mitch. Henry, attempting to make up for his insensitivity in the previous episode, begs Jen to forgive him, and they spend a romantic night together on the roof of the restaurant. Grams is disappointed at Jen's conduct until Jen reveals that the two did not have sex.
57	22	"The Anti-Prom"	Greg Prange	Maggie Friedman	May 17, 2000	322	3.93
Dawson, Joey, and Andie organize a counter-cultural prom after Jack faces discrimination over his prom date, Ethan. Dawson asks Joey to be his date, while Andie asks Pacey, hoping to win back their exes. However, Joey and Pacey share a moment on the dance floor, overshadowing their dates' intentions. The next day, Joey tells Dawson she's not ready to make decisions. Jen learns that Henry will spend the summer at football camp without informing her, leading to their breakup. Jack's date with Ethan also ends poorly when Ethan admits he's not ready to openly date a man. Gail proposes to Mitch, witnessed by Dawson and Joey.
58	23	"True Love"	James Whitmore, Jr.	Story by : Greg Berlanti & Jeffrey Stepakoff; Teleplay by : Tom Kapinos & Gina Fattore	May 24, 2000	323	4.83
Gail and Mitch prepare for their wedding, with Dawson as the best man and Joey as the maid of honor. Despite news of Pacey planning to leave for a three-month trip, Joey pushes through the festivities for Dawson's sake. At Pacey's farewell party, Jen and Jack express regrets about their recent relationships, prompting Grams to encourage seizing the moment. Jen reconciles with Henry and Jack kisses Ethan, facing his fears. Meanwhile, Jack's father expresses pride in his son's identity. As the day progresses, Joey realizes her feelings for Pacey, and Dawson encourages her to pursue him. Joey and Pacey share a kiss and set sail together the next morning. Returning home, Dawson finds support from Jen, Jack, and Andie after his rejection by Joey.

=== Season 4 (2000–01) ===
Dawson's Creek fourth season started on October 4, 2000, and ended on May 23, 2001. This season takes place during the characters' senior year of high school in Capeside.

Meredith Monroe left the series after episode, "You Had Me at Goodbye", but continued to be credited in the season, returning only to participate in the episode "The Graduate".

No. overall	No. in season	Title	Directed by	Written by	Original release date	Prod. code	U.S. viewers (millions)
59	1	"Coming Home"	Greg Prange	Greg Berlanti	October 4, 2000	401	4.98
Pacey and Joey return from their vacation on "True Love" to find Dawson deeply hurt. Initially avoiding them, Dawson eventually agrees to talk to Joey with Jen's encouragement. Meanwhile, Pacey's sister Gretchen moves in with Doug, leaving Pacey homeless. Despite his reluctance, Pacey ends up living on his boat after exhausting all other options. Dawson confides in Jack about his childhood crush on Gretchen. Joey apologizes to Dawson, but he remains uncertain about rebuilding their friendship.
60	2	"Failing Down"	Sandy Smolan	Tom Kapinos	October 11, 2000	402	5.37
Joey is looking for a new job and gets one at the Yacht Club, a high-end restaurant, by lying to the proprietress, a wealthy and cynical Mrs. Valentine (Carolyn Hennesy), that she knows a very influential family. She then falls afoul of the spoiled and trouble-making teenage son of that family, who instantly sees through her lies... and is additionally revealed to be lying about his identity himself; he is actually Drue Valentine (Mark Matkevich), living here with his divorced mother. Mitch, now working as a guidance counselor at Capeside High, tells Pacey he will not graduate unless he makes up for his bad grades from the previous academic year. Pacey doesn't want Joey to know, but Mitch tells Dawson, who tells Joey, showing that he still cares about Pacey. Joey confronts him, and Pacey manages to admit that he needs help.
61	3	"The Two Gentlemen of Capeside"	Sandy Smolan	Jeffrey Stepakoff	October 18, 2000	403	5.02
The Yacht Club becomes the focal point as characters gather for various reasons: Andie interviews with Mrs. Valentine, Joey collaborates with Dawson and Drue last-minute, and boats seek shelter from an approaching storm. Joey panics when Pacey and Jen are caught in the storm while sailing to celebrate Pacey's good grade. Andie takes charge of the situation after being snubbed by Mrs. Valentine due to her mental health history. Dawson and Joey borrow a motorboat to rescue Pacey and Jen, aided by Jack boarding up windows and Drue helping clean up. The rescue is successful, but Pacey loses his boat, "True Love." Pacey apologizes to Dawson for unintentionally hurting him with his romance with Joey, and they both express missing their friendship. Jen is surprised to encounter Drue, who knew her during her partying days in New York.
62	4	"Future Tense"	Michael Lange	Gina Fattore	October 25, 2000	404	5.04
Everybody starts to think about their future, and their higher education options. Joey is concerned about Pacey not having grades good enough to get into college and gets drunk to forget her worries. Drue makes everybody think it is Jen's birthday so he can have a party to get to know more people; his gift to her, rejected, is two tablets of ecstasy. Andie takes over Jack's applications and drives him crazy with her obsessive behavior. Gretchen applies for a job as bartender at the Leery's restaurant and appears reluctant to admit her reason for not going back to college.
63	5	"A Family Way"	Nancy Malone	Maggie Friedman	November 1, 2000	405	5.20
Gail surprises the family with news of her pregnancy. Joey, feeling unsure about her physical relationship with Pacey, seeks advice from Jen and decides to visit a doctor for contraceptives. Jack faces discrimination when a player's older sister attempts to proposition him, leading to some children quitting his soccer team due to homophobic parents. Dawson struggles to accept the idea of having a younger sibling, especially when Gail considers abortion. Seeking guidance, Dawson turns to Gretchen, who left college after facing a similar situation. A confrontation arises between Joey and Bessie over contraceptives, leading Joey to realize she's not ready for intimacy, a sentiment echoed by Pacey. Meanwhile, Dawson repaints Mr. Brooks' house as an apology for damaging his boat, receiving criticism for his photography hobby until Mr. Brooks acknowledges one photo capturing empathy towards Gretchen.
64	6	"Great Xpectations"	Bruce Seth Green	Nan Hagan	November 8, 2000	406	5.64
Andie has received an early admission to Harvard University, but accomplishing what should be the biggest thing in her life doesn't exactly make her happy. She decides to explore different paths by going to a rave, and ends up consuming one of the MDMA tablets Drue gave to Jen. The tablet reacts with her anti-depressants, a disastrous combination which almost leads her to death. Mitch and Gail decide to keep their baby, news that makes Dawson very happy.
65	7	"You Had Me at Goodbye"	John Behring	Zack Estrin & Chris Levinson	November 15, 2000	407	4.54
While Andie is recovering from her near-fatal overdose at the party, Jack unfairly blames Jen for the whole incident and refuses to talk to her. Jen blames Drue for her life falling apart when he turns Grams and the whole town against her by telling everyone that he gave Jen the drugs, and they got from her to Andie. Drue goes even further by deliberately getting both himself and Jen arrested over the incident in a twisted ploy of his to further isolate Jen from her friends and bring her closer to him. After Andie comes home from the hospital, her father offers her the chance to spend the rest of the school year in Italy with a relative, telling her that she has more than enough credits to graduate. Andie decides to go and plans a goodbye dinner with the whole gang. She tells them how important life is and not to waste valuable time with useless bickering. Jack and Jen get things straight and Andie tricks Dawson and Pacey into playing nice with each other, resulting in the last photograph of the six main characters together as friends. The episode is dedicated to David Dukes, who had died of a sudden heart attack on October 9th of that year. It also marks the last appearance of Andie and Jack's father Mr. McPhee, whom Dukes played prior to his death.
66	8	"The Unusual Suspects"	James Whitmore Jr.	Jon Kasdan	November 22, 2000	408	4.68
A sailboat owned by Principal Peskin is found one morning in the Capeside High school swimming pool with 'Class of 2001' painted on the sail as part of a school prank with his pet dog on board. Dawson, Pacey, and Jack are suspected and interrogated by Mr. Peskin and Mitch due to their connections over the incident (Dawson had access to the school, Pacey had access to the boat yard where Mr. Peskin's boat was stolen the previous day, and Jack had access to Mr. Peskin's pet dog.) However, all three of them give solid alibis for their whereabouts the previous day which check out; Jack was teaching little league soccer all day with Jen volunteering as part of her community service sentence; Dawson was cleaning Mr. Brooks' house for most of the day; and Pacey was riding along with his brother Doug. Peskin blames Drue for organizing the prank due to him being seen at a paint store by Jack, having access to Dawson's school keys which Dawson allegedly "lost" for over three hours the previous day, and Drue was seen by Pacey and Doug at the boat yard that evening after he was told by an "anonymous phone call" to meet someone there. Peskin suspends Drue for two weeks and puts him on probation for the duration of the school year. Mitch, however, is not so easily fooled, but he remains silent and he later and privately tells Joey to congratulate "the boys," prompting Dawson to privately admit to Joey how they "could have" orchestrated the prank and framed Drue. Dawson later works with Pacey to cover their tracks. Absent: Meredith Monroe
67	9	"Kiss Kiss Bang Bang"	Perry Lang	Tom Kapinos	November 29, 2000	409	4.96
Dawson seeks advice from Mr. Brooks, a former movie director, for his USC film school application essay. Meanwhile, Joey takes Pacey to a dinner at Worthington College, missing the Leery Christmas party. Gretchen convinces Gail and Mitch to host the party. Jack learns Jen hasn't applied to any colleges and, with Grams, submits applications for her. Joey is concerned about Pacey fitting in at the dinner but realizes he's helping her network. At the party, Mr. Brooks shares his past and encourages Dawson and Gretchen to kiss under mistletoe, witnessed by Joey and Pacey. Absent: Meredith Monroe
68	10	"Self Reliance"	David Petrarca	Gina Fattore	December 20, 2000	410	4.24
Gretchen comes to Dawson's house and dismisses their kiss as merely the spirit of the season. Dawson is disappointed. Joey can't find a moment alone to study or deal with her feelings concerning Dawson kissing Gretchen. Dawson's collaboration with Brooks — a documentary of the director's life — begins, rejuvenating his filmmaking spirit. Meanwhile, Jen takes Jack to a "Gay-Straight Teen Coalition" meeting, but she seems to fit in with the crowd more than Jack does: Jack is uncomfortable being reduced merely to a stereotype. This results in conflict with the coalition's leader, Tobey (David Monahan), who seems intent on doing just that — though the stereotype of Jack's he's most wary of is "jock." Absent: Meredith Monroe
69	11	"The Tao of Dawson"	Keith Samples	Jeffrey Stepakoff	January 10, 2001	411	4.87
Dawson confesses his crush on Gretchen to Pacey, who disapproves. When Pacey and Gretchen go on a road trip to retrieve her car from her ex-boyfriend, Nick (Christian Kane), Pacey tries to reunite them but soon realizes Nick's true colors. Meanwhile, Joey gets locked in the Yacht Club's storage basement with Drue, who has done this to avoid seeing his father for child support. Dawson worries about Grams getting hurt when she learns Mr. Brooks is terminally ill, but Grams reveals she already knows. Influenced by Jack and Mr. Brooks, Dawson decides to pursue Gretchen. With Pacey's approval, Gretchen reciprocates Dawson's feelings, and they share a kiss upon her return. Absent: Michelle Williams and Meredith Monroe
70	12	"The Te of Pacey"	Harry Winer	Maggie Friedman	January 17, 2001	412	4.49
Joey helps organize a surprise 18th birthday party for Pacey, unaware of his "birthday curse." The party turns sour quickly when Pacey's immature and dysfunctional family; his alcoholic and abusive father, his weak and subservient mother, his self-loathing older sister Kerry, and even Doug, humiliates Pacey with stories about his childhood. It is there that Pacey has a mental breakdown and he admits to receiving no college acceptances. Dawson becomes upset when he feels Gretchen is hiding their relationship, but he convinces her to live in the moment. Meanwhile, Jen suspects Tobey's romantic feelings for Jack while she is paired with him for another community service assignment of being the designated driver to a group of drunken college kids. Later, Pacey's father apologizes to Pacey for his behavior, and recalls one good memory of Pacey's childhood of having a fireworks display for his 10th birthday and decides to throw him one for old times sake. Absent: Meredith Monroe
71	13	"Hopeless"	Krishna Rao	Nan Hagan	January 31, 2001	413	4.54
As the senior trip approaches, Joey and Pacey agree to double-date with Drue and his girlfriend Anna (guest star Sabine Singh) so Joey can get time off work. They help Drue navigate his feelings for Anna, despite his self-centeredness. Meanwhile, Dawson grapples with the age gap between him and Gretchen's college friends, particularly when they attend a club that stamps his hand 'under 21'. Jack receives attention from Tobey, who has romantic intentions, but Jack declines. Pacey and Joey confront their own relationship, with Joey admitting fear is holding her back from sex. Lastly, Dawson discovers Mr. Brooks refusing his cancer medications, opting to go out on his own terms. Absent: Michelle Williams and Meredith Monroe
72	14	"A Winter's Tale"	Greg Prange	Zack Estrin & Chris Levinson	February 7, 2001	414	5.10
As Mr. Brooks's condition worsens, Dawson remains in Capeside, skipping the senior ski trip. Joey and Pacey argue about sex after Drue and Anna challenge them and Joey realises Pacey carries a condom in his wallet. Jen sprains her ankle and breaks into the minibar. She and Jack get drunk and make out, but Jen stops it because she knows Jack is simply lonely. Dawson grapples with the decision of whether to honor Mr. Brooks's wishes to let him go. Meanwhile, Pacey opens up to Anna but rejects her advances, and Joey and Pacey reconcile and finally consummate their relationship when Joey takes the initiative. Absent: Meredith Monroe
73	15	"Four Stories"	David Petrarca	Tom Kapinos	February 14, 2001	415	3.95
The episode consists of four different vignettes.: "About Last Night": Pacey and Joey discuss their feelings the morning after they had sex. Joey is defensive and Pacey pushes her for a verdict. They argue as per usual. Joey eventually convinces Pacey that, though she hasn't described the sex as great (it was 'nice' she says), she is worried about him comparing her to other women. She also says there was one lovely moment she will always remember and it is good to have her first time with a man she loves.; "The Big Picture": Dawson struggles with the death of Mr. Brooks, particularly the realization that only five people came to his funeral — and that, had Dawson not "borrowed" his boat the previous fall, none of those five would have been present. He is surprised to discover he has been named in Mr. Brooks' will, becoming the beneficiary of a sum of money sufficient to pay for college tuition.; "Excess Baggage": As punishment for breaking into the mini-bar, Mr. Kasdan decides to send Jen to a psychologist, Dr. Tom Frost (Rob Nagle). Despite her initial frostiness and sarcasm she decides to take advantage of the opportunity and begins to discuss her feelings of parental abandonment, unhealthy relationship with drugs and alcohol, and the fact that she made out and almost slept with a gay man who can never fully return her affections — all part, Dr. Frost claims, of her coping mechanisms.; "Seems Like Old Times": Joey and Dawson run into each other, and they spend an evening catching up on the past weekend. Joey feels bad that she wasn't able to support Dawson while Mr Brooks was dying. At the end of the night Dawson asks Joey if she slept with Pacey, and Joey — who had told Pacey she would never lie to Dawson about this — says no.; Absent: Meredith Monroe
74	16	"Mind Games"	David Straiton	Gina Fattore	February 28, 2001	416	4.00
Secrets spiral out of control as Pacey begs Gretchen to find somewhere to overnight, so that he and Joey can have the place to themselves. As it turns out, the Leerys will be out of town, and Gretchen makes herself comfortable with Dawson; but, as they chat she learns that Joey lied to him about her virginity. She confronts Joey and advises her to come clean. Meanwhile, Jen enlists Jack to help her stalk Dr. Frost, whom she knows nothing about. Absent: Meredith Monroe
75	17	"Admissions"	Lev L. Spiro	Barb Siebertz	April 11, 2001	417	3.25
Joey and Dawson receive college news: Dawson is rejected by NYU, while Joey is accepted to Worthington. Despite Bessie's celebration, Joey receives a second letter offering financial aid provided her family contribute $15,000. Meanwhile, Jen tries to persuade Jack that college in New York no longer appeals to her. He says as long as they go to college together, where doesn't matter. Jen begins exploring the root of her estrangement from her father with Dr. Frost's help. Dawson offers Joey financial assistance from Mr. Brooks's inheritance, leading to Joey confessing she lied about Pacey. Dawson reaffirms their friendship and supports her financially. He also gets news USC accepted him. Pacey worries about Joey's future and his place in it. Absent: Meredith Monroe
76	18	"Eastern Standard Time"	David Grossman	Jonathan Kasdan	April 18, 2001	418	4.13
As Senior Ditch Day arrives, Joey is excited to find herself on an excursion to her hometown of New York City with Jen. Jen is here to confront her father Theodore (guest star Don McManus). He takes the girls to lunch at a local restaurant but then leaves them. Later, Jen confronts Theodore at his office and it is here that she reveals the source of her trauma: when she was 12 she saw him in bed with a neighbour - a girl about age 17. Having confronted him with this event, Jen meets up with Joey and returns to Capeside. Meanwhile, Gretchen and Dawson take off on a road trip, but get a flat tire and cannot pay the mechanic (guest star Pat Hingle) for its repair because of Dawson unwisely leaving his wallet behind. They spend the night on the beach, and tell each other they love each other, but hold back from consummating their relationship as Gretchen sees Dawson is trying to prove something. Back in Capeside, Drue tries to bond with Pacey. Drue sneaks them into a bar with fake IDs, but they are arrested for public drunkenness. Doug comes to fish them out, and Pacey lashes out saying that if he can't enjoy this time -- specifically, public drunkenness -- he will have nothing. Absent: Kerr Smith and Meredith Monroe
77	19	"Late"	David Petrarca	Jeffrey Stepakoff	April 25, 2001	419	4.15
As Gail's due date approaches, the women in her life throw her a baby shower where they suggest names for the baby. Pacey is away camping with his brother. Meantime Joey is worried because her period is late and wants to speak to him. With support from Gretchen and Bessie, she takes a pregnancy test, which turns out negative. Meanwhile, Dawson grapples with the possibility of his relationship with Gretchen ending due to their upcoming long-distance moves. Jack supports Tobey after he is gay-bashed, encouraging him to report the crime despite his shame. Finally, Gail gives birth after a long and difficult labor, naming the baby Lillian. Absent: Meredith Monroe
78	20	"Promicide"	Jason Moore	Maggie Friedman	May 2, 2001	420	4.32
Senior Prom for Capeside High arrives which is held this year onboard a yacht, which causes every relationship to implode. Pacey has returned, but Joey is concerned about his lack of interest in anything remotely sexual (she did not tell him about the pregnancy scare). Jen lies to Tobey that Jack wants to ask him to prom but is too shy, leading Tobey to call Jack with a spontaneous Yes. Drue arrives to make the same speech to Jen. Pacey sets out to make Joey's prom special, but does poorly with arrangements. The four couples (Dawson and Gretchen, Joey and Pacey, Jen and Drue, Jack and Tobey) depart from the Leery home, Drue learns that Jen has numerous nips in her purse; it becomes clear that she is having trouble with the idea of returning to New York. Jack admits that his claims of platonic feelings towards Tobey were a lie, and the two kiss. Gretchen, who can legally buy alcohol, feels utterly out of place at a high-school prom, and breaks up with Dawson. Pacey confronts Joey about his failures; he admits that he needs her to be critical, needs her to expect more of him, and that he cannot continue to feel like a charity project. Jen becomes so drunk that she nearly falls off the yacht, but Drue, in a rare moment of compassion and heroism, saves her. The night ends with the four couples heading home. Absent: Meredith Monroe
79	21	"Separation Anxiety"	Krishna Rao	Rina Mimoun	May 9, 2001	421	4.78
The school year draws to a close, and Joey and Dawson deal with their respective break-ups. Jen learns that Grams is selling her house to put Jen through college and plans to move to a retirement community. Dawson learns that Gretchen plans to return to college after a summer road trip. He offers to go with her and she agrees. Mr. Kubelik, the alumni rep from Worthington, asks Joey to bring Pacey with her to a party as he and the dean of admissions have an offer for Pacey. However, Kubelik merely wants to offer Pacey a job as a deckhand on his yacht. Jen asks Grams to move to Boston with her and Jack, and Grams agrees. Dawson realizes that he is going to miss a great deal of Lilly's babyhood as he goes off to college, and arrives at Pacey and Gretchen's house to find that she has already gone, leaving only his yearbook, in which she exhorts him to live the life already before him, and says that she loves him. Absent: Meredith Monroe
80	22	"The Graduate"	Harry Winer	Alan Cross	May 16, 2001	422	5.45
As graduation approaches, Joey has a tough time preparing her salutatorian speech, but is inspired by a surprise gift from her late mother. Pacey wonders if he's going to graduate at all, and studies hard for his last final. When his pencil breaks, the teacher makes a snide comment about his lack of preparedness, and Pacey talks back saying the teacher and school always focus on the honors students instead of the struggling under-achiever types like him. He then walks out. The teacher later goes to his home and invites him to take the final there. Meanwhile, Andie McPhee returns home for the cap and gown ceremony, and is surprised but happy to meet Jack's new boyfriend, Tobey. Drue, who is staying at Jen's after a fight with his mother, convinces Jen to help him pull one last senior prank by setting off the school lawn sprinklers during the commencement, but they get caught by Principal Peskin, who gives them detention for two hours by forcing them to hear his terrible cello playing skills. Pacey tells Andie he has decided to take Kubelik's job offer on the boat, and is last seen boarding a plane as he graduates in absentia.
81	23	"Coda"	Greg Prange	Gina Fattore & Tom Kapinos	May 23, 2001	423	4.85
Accepted early to USC, Dawson finds his last night in Capeside has arrived much sooner than anticipated. While he looks forward to spending the evening with Joey, Jack and Jen, Mitch wants to spend the evening with his son. He plans to buy Dawson a Pentium III laptop, despite Dawson's preference for Macs. Meanwhile, Dawson is not the only goodbye Jen has to deal with, as she and Grams bid farewell to the house they've lived in for the past three years. Pacey, somewhere in the Caribbean, borrows a crewmate's feature phone to make one phone call home: to Dawson, the only person he wishes he'd given a proper goodbye. Dawson tells Pacey how proud he is of his best friend. Finally, Joey attempts to say goodbye to Dawson, but ends up telling him that she wants him to stay. The two of them share a goodbye kiss. Absent: Meredith Monroe

=== Season 5 (2001–02) ===
Season 5 started on October 10, 2001, and ended May 15, 2002. The season takes place during the characters' freshman year of college in Boston. The season includes the series' 100th episode.

No. overall	No. in season	Title	Directed by	Written by	Original release date	Prod. code	U.S. viewers (millions)
82	1	"The Bostonians"	Greg Prange	Tom Kapinos	October 10, 2001	501	4.47
Dawson is a freshman film student in Los Angeles and about to begin an internship at a studio under director Todd Carr (Hal Ozsan), while Joey is settling in at Worthington College in Boston. Instead of focusing on their new lives, they find themselves distracted by the distance between them and their unsettling last kiss. Joey is out of her depth, dealing with promiscuous roommate Audrey Liddell and a demanding creative writing professor, David Wilder (Ken Marino), who gives her story -- based on her kiss with Dawson -- a C. Jen and Jack try to settle in at (the fictional) Boston Bay College, with Jack taking the chance to tease Jen about her lack of love life: he points out that in the last year, both of them have only kissed one man, and the man Jen kissed was him. Jen visits the harbor, where Pacey has moved in secret, a caretaker to Kubelik's yacht. Joey, Jack and Jen, with Audrey tagging along, attend a frat party; there, Audrey admits to Joey that she too has a romantic attachment from high school she left behind; Jack begins to bond with the members of the fraternity; and Jen finds a romantic spark with Charlie Todd (Chad Michael Murray), whose band was hired for the party. Joey leaves an emotional voicemail message to Dawson that it's time for them to go their separate ways; the next morning, he arrives at her dorm room, having been fired from his internship, and doubting his future in LA.
83	2	"The Lost Weekend"	David Petrarca	Gina Fattore	October 17, 2001	502	4.99
Dawson is packing to return to LA after spending the weekend with Joey when he receives the voicemail she left him the previous Friday. The two are unable to hash out their differences as Joey spends the day trying to get permission to drop her writing class and get the form through Worthington bureaucracy. At the behest of his brother, Pacey reluctantly gets a dish-washer job at Civilization, a restaurant run by an ambitious chef, Danny Brecher (Ian Kahn), and meets a waitress named Karen (Lourdes Benedicto). Although Karen has a boyfriend, that doesn't stop Pacey from feeling attracted to her. Audrey gives Dawson a tour of the campus while Joey is busy, and Jen helps Charlie at the radio station, then secures a job as his co-host. She also winds up in bed with him.
84	3	"Capeside Revisited"	Michael Lange	Jeffrey Stepakoff	October 24, 2001	503	4.4
Joey, Audrey and Jen go out to dinner at Civilization, where Joey is perturbed to see Pacey working in the back; she is shocked to learn from Jen that he's been here for more than three weeks and has made no attempt to contact her. Jack is offered a bid by the Sigma Epsilon fraternity; he tells them that he is gay, but they say diversity is part of their mandate, so he accepts. Dawson heads home to Capeside, having made the decision to drop out of university and move to Boston. While Gail is understanding, Mitch is not. Jen, disturbed that her connection to Charlie is primarily sexual, spends the day trying to learn something about him. Dawson and his father have a heated argument about Dawson's future. Mitch thinks Dawson is making a mistake, but adds that he loves his son unconditionally. Joey visits Pacey, and they rekindle their friendship. After Dawson has left, Mitch runs out to the store to get milk for Lilly; he takes his eyes off the road and is killed in a crash.
85	4	"The Long Goodbye"	Robert McNeill	Tom Kapinos	October 31, 2001	504	4.48
The main characters assemble in Capeside to bury Mitch Leery. Dawson and Gail are devastated that Lilly will never remember her father. Dawson is convinced that he is at fault, as his father would have been driving him to the airport instead of going to the store if he had taken Mitch's advice about film school. Pacey takes him to the scene of the accident and shows him how the other driver - who had worked a double shift - was at fault. But Dawson does not allow himself to cry until he visits the store for milk and speaks to the proprietor -- the last person to see Mitch alive -- and is reminded how much his father loved him. Finally, the episode is littered with flashbacks in which the characters (played by their present-day actors) remember moments with Mitch: Dawson, on his 12th birthday, receiving his first video camera; Joey watching Mitch put up the ladder that she used to get into Dawson's room; Pacey, being taught to drive by him; and Gail, in 1983, agreeing they'll teach their soon-to-be-born son Dawson to become a good man.
86	5	"Use Your Disillusion"	Perry Lang	Rina Mimoun	November 7, 2001	506	3.77
Dawson takes Joey up on her invitation to spend a weekend in Boston, but the two have difficulty talking, and later Dawson has a panic attack. Joey is asked by Professor Wilder to join a small team of students cataloguing the estate of recently-deceased author, Worthington alumni Rose Lazare. Jack is surprised when his boyfriend Tobey shows up unexpectedly, forcing Jack to choose between his fraternity's hell week and spending time with Tobey. Jack keeps leaving Tobey when his frat brothers call and Jen is left to pick up the pieces. Later, Jack tells Jen he wants to meet new people, but she says he should have been honest with Tobey, rather than avoid seeing him. The two stop speaking. Pacey is asked by Chef Danny if he (Danny) can borrow Pacey's boat for a romantic evening with his wife; Pacey agrees. Jen, on her way to a production of Othello, sees Charlie in a coffee shop touching a woman's hand; she storms in and throws iced coffee at his lap. But the woman is his sister, who had been showing off her engagement ring. Jen apologises but later sees him kissing another woman outside his dorm room.
87	6	"High Anxiety"	Jason Moore	Allison Robinson & Joshua Krist	November 14, 2001	507	4.5
Dawson is having trouble with anxiety attacks so his doctor refers him to a grief therapist in Boston. Outside the office Dawson changes his mind and instead embarks on a night of debauchery with Jack and his frat brothers, which ends with a drunken Dawson citing his kiss with Joey as being the reason Dawson dropped out of USC, and therefore of Mitch's death. Jen, conferring with Pacey on the issue of Charlie's cheating, finds a locket; Pacey passes it to Danny for his wife. Jen finds the other woman, Nora (Andrea C. Pearson), hiding in Charlie's wardrobe. Charlie suggests they all continue dating and Jen pretends to go along with this, but conspires with Nora to leave him naked and locked out of his dorm room, and short of several prized possessions. Audrey seeks emotional support from Joey when her critical mother Kay (Brenda Strong) visits. And Pacey recognises the lost locket around Karen's neck...
88	7	"Text, Lies and Videotape"	Marita Grabiak	Karin Lewicki	November 21, 2001	508	3.41
Jen helps Dawson go to the grief counselor (Pauley Perrette) he ran away from the week before. Dawson finds the idea of sharing his thoughts with a complete stranger uncomfortable, but he is surprised with how much he learns from it. Back in Capeside, Dawson and Gail run into problems handling Mitch's will: he never signed an updated version that includes Lily. Meanwhile, Joey helps Professor Wilder's hand-picked team sift through Rose Lazare's letters; they are frank and detailed, leading to the hypothesis that Lazar had a secret lesbian lover. Joey, with the help of Audrey's audition tape for a (fictional) season of The Real World set in Ibiza, realizes that the letters were Lazare's diary entries, writing to herself. Pacey confronts Karen about the risks she is taking by having an affair with Danny; his point is underlined when Danny's wife Emily shows up unannounced at a party hosted by the restaurant and Danny must abandon Karen to keep up appearances. Absent: Kerr Smith
89	8	"Hotel New Hampshire"	Lev L. Spiro	Diego Gutierrez	November 28, 2001	509	4.19
Nora approaches Jen at the radio station and asks if Charlie has also been writing Jen lovesick letters begging her to take him back (he hasn't). To break her out of her funk, Dawson takes her on a road trip to a small film festival in Hooksett, New Hampshire, where his documentary about Mr. Brooks, submitted by Mitch on Dawson's behalf, has won the grand prize. His main competition is Oliver Chirchick (Jordan Bridges), who has won the festival three years running and who starts off assuming Dawson a "Hollywood slickster;" however, over the course of the festival, the two come to appreciate each other's work, and Oliver informs Dawson of a Visual Arts College in Boston which he (Oliver) attends and which Dawson could enroll in. Jack brings Joey and Audrey to a frat party under false pretenses, believing Audrey promiscuous enough to help his brother get laid; he apologizes the next day. Pacey takes Karen on a non-romantic date, but it culminates in the two of them having sex — which Pacey realizes was actually Karen's way of getting back at Danny for "abandoning" her for his wife. Karen quits her job at the restaurant and heads off for a new start. Finally, Dawson and Jen are amused to have been assigned the honeymoon suite at the Hooksett hotel, but Dawson ends up losing his virginity to Jen, and they decide to continue seeing one another.
90	9	"Four Scary Stories"	Krishna Rao	Jed Seidel	December 12, 2001	505	3.99
After watching scary movies, Joey, Pacey and Jack talk about their creepiest experiences and urban legends.: Joey shares her story of how she was almost attacked by the librarian on Halloween and saved by the creepy man she was running from.; Jack describes helping to clean the frat house basement and finding a pledge gagged and bound in a closet in what is believed to be a hazing ritual; however, the pledge is implied to be the ghost of a closeted gay man who committed suicide in the 60s.; Pacey reveals that he was chased by a black car while giving Karen a ride home; after some dodging and driving, they managed to run it off the road, but discovered that there was nobody driving the car.; The fourth story is delivered by Grams, who tells the second-hand tale of a time when Jen, working late at the radio station, managed to accidentally lock herself out.; Absent: James Van Der Beek
91	10	"Appetite for Destruction"	Harry Winer	Anna Fricke	December 19, 2001	510	4.21
To encourage the gang to actually hold one of the weekly dinners they've been planning since the start of the semester, Pacey offers to cook the meal; he, Joey, Jack and Audrey discuss the fact that Dawson and Jen stayed an extra night in New Hampshire after the film festival, making them a little late to dinner. Jen and Dawson, arriving, decide to keep their re-kindled relationship to themselves, but are caught by everyone kissing at the door. The resulting tense atmosphere derails dinner, with Joey's feelings at the forefront of everyone's minds. She reluctantly accepts Dawson's new status with Jen, but is wounded when Dawson tells her that he needs to move on and away from a past which no longer contains his father, which he could not do if he dated her. Charlie also drops by, causing some tension between Dawson and Jen; he admits that Nora has rejected him, but Jen is adamant that she's already taken. Joey talks to Pacey about her real feelings about Dawson and Jen.
92	11	"Something Wild"	Michael Lange	Jeffrey Stepakoff	January 16, 2002	511	3.75
Joey, Audrey and Pacey go out to celebrate at a nightclub: Pacey has been promoted to chef, Audrey has been hired as a waitress at Civilization (primarily on her ability to put Pacey in his place), and Joey has achieved a perfect GPA for her first semester at Worthington. Audrey suggests to Joey that they should both kiss some boys but Joey is reluctant to do so. Charlie's band is playing, and Charlie hits on Joey, though he gives up when Joey confirms that she knows what he did to Jen. Still, he challenges her to do something wild. This culminates in Joey taking the stage to sing "I Want You To Want Me," and planting a spontaneous kiss on Charlie backstage. Dawson and Jen go back to Capeside to visit Gail and Lilly, where they have their first fight over what Dawson will do with his life. Gail formally releases him from his responsibilities to the Leery household, and all three agree that Dawson should move to Boston, enroll in the Visual Arts College, and live with Jen and Grams. Absent: Kerr Smith
93	12	"Sleeping Arrangements"	Mel Damski	Jed Seidel	January 23, 2002	512	4.31
Dawson and Jen see that living together is tricky. Between ruined toothbrushes and bathroom overcrowding, they get on each other's nerves. Jen faces a new challenge at work after her regular show turns into an advice show. She mainly gives advice to girls with relationship problems, and makes statements on men that hurt Dawson's feelings, but Dawson surprises her by saying he won't ever treat her badly; meanwhile, the producers offer her another show as an advice expert. Meanwhile, Melanie (Jennifer Morrison), who spent the summer with Pacey, shows up. Her father has sold the yacht Pacey is caretaking and bought a new one. He wants Pacey aboard as a deckhand for a Caribbean cruise that leaves in three days. After a lot of thinking, Pacey decides not to go, since he has made a successful life in Boston. Jack moves into the fraternity house and gets his own room, but he becomes uneasy when he discovers an older guy moved out to share with a freshman who was supposed to share with Jack. The freshman, Eric (Ryan Bittle), felt uncomfortable sharing a room with a gay man.
94	13	"Something Wilder"	David Petrarca	Rina Mimoun	January 30, 2002	513	4.13
Dawson attends the Visual Arts College. Oliver wastes no time in asking Dawson to direct a movie he wrote. Dawson is impressed with the script, but refuses the directing job due to fear of the inevitable lows that follow any sort of emotional highs. Oliver reminds him that this is a terrible way to live life, and Dawson accepts the directorship. Oliver plans to play the starring role. Meanwhile, Jen's new radio show gets terrible reviews: her blissful relationship with Dawson has transformed her from the sarcastic Jen preferred by listeners to someone bubbly and sappy. This problem is solved by Oliver: he intrudes on Dawson's attempts to dine with Jen, obsessed with getting Dawson's feedback on the script, and his casual nerd misogyny infuriates her. Elsewhere, Jack is on academic probation. Irritated, he goes out and has a few too many drinks at Civilization, which results in a fight with his fraternity brothers. Pacey breaks up the fight, concerned for Jack. Finally, Joey is pursued by Elliot (Ned Brower), a somewhat uninspiring freshman, 'a nice guy', and agrees to go on a date with him, but lies to him and cancels when Prof. Wilder takes his students out to celebrate the close of their project. Joey confesses that she doesn't get that "butterflies in her stomach" feeling from Elliot, and instead gets it from the wrong people, such as Professor Wilder. They kiss at the end of the night before they both draw back.
95	14	"Guerilla Filmmaking"	Julia Rask	Jonathan Kasdan	February 6, 2002	514	4.38
Directing Oliver's movie is not an easy task. Audrey, playing opposite Oliver, has problems with the star's kissing skills, and Dawson discovers that Oliver is a deficient thespian, leading to a re-casting of Charlie in the role. This puts the film under additional pressure: the final scene must be shot by the end of the day, as the lights are only rented for that long, and Dawson wants to change it as he feels it lacking. Audrey, practicing lines with Pacey, kisses him in a moment of passion; later, she locks herself in the bathroom out of guilt for making a move on her roommate's ex, but Joey, called in by Dawson, gives the two of them her blessing. Joey was called away from Professor Wilder's house, where she has made the decision to quit his writing seminar, thereby allowing them to date. Meanwhile, Jack and Eric bond over the former's coming-out experience, and Eric's body language suggests a regard deeper than friendship; however, Eric then goes to the fraternity's leadership and claims that Jack kissed him without consent. Jack, seeing that he has been pre-judged, quits the fraternity, stopping only to wish Eric clarity and greater self-acceptance. Dawson and Audrey improvise a successful ending in one long take, and Joey heads back to Professor Wilder's house through a snowy, late-night Boston. To be continued...
96	15	"Downtown Crossing"	David Petrarca	Tom Kapinos	February 13, 2002	515	4.03
Joey stops at an ATM at the eponymous Downtown Crossing shopping district. There, she is held up at gunpoint by a mugger (Sam Ball) who demands her mobile phone and drains her bank account; he explains that he needs to get back into the good graces of his estranged wife. He demands Joey's coat for use as a gift. As he crosses the street he is struck by a moving car. Joey retrieves her possessions and, despite the criminal's protests, calls an ambulance. She faints and is taken to hospital too. Joey takes custody of a lost girl, Sammy (Olivia Milo Pence), and finds her mother, Grace (Mercedes McNab). They are at the hospital because Sammy's dad is sick. Grace and Joey bond until Grace realizes that her husband is Joey's assailant; wishing her husband good riddance, she leaves. Later Joey agrees to visit the mugger, knowing the man and her own father turned to drug dealing blue-collar crime despite having a wife and child/ren. She hopes to finds answers to why... The man says he can't help himself and explains how he stole his daughter's day care money. He appears to be dying and asks if Joey still loves her father despite all the ways he disappointed her. Joey admits that she does, and the mugger dies. Joey runs into Grace and Sammy. Sammy asks if her father did a bad thing to Joey, and she lies saying he pushed Joey out of the way of an oncoming vehicle. Absent: James Van Der Beek, Joshua Jackson, Michelle Williams, Kerr Smith, Mary Beth Peil
97	16	"In a Lonely Place"	Keith Samples	Gina Fattore	February 20, 2002	516	3.98
Joey visits Prof. Wilder to explain why she failed to turn up at his house, but he does not allow her to speak and suggests she had avoided him for good reasons. Dawson invites her to watch In A Lonely Place with him. They see Prof. Wilder with an unknown woman and Joey is uneasy. Later, Wilder kisses the woman and leaves the screening early. Joey follows him to the foyer. He explains he sometimes meets the woman although they are wrong for one another (preserving the idea that he hasn't been deceiving Joey), and then waffles about wistful endings in books and life. This makes Joey feel content with their affair never fully becoming an affair. Meantime, Jen is interviewing Steve (Drew Wood) and Wynn (Nick Cornish), members of a rock band, on behalf of the radio station, and brings Audrey along. This leaves Pacey at a loose end, so he goes with Jack to a bar that does not check its patrons' ages — Later, Pacey realises it's a gay bar. He bonds with a food critic who had previously published a critical review of Civilization. Jack points out that the critic is so attentive because he is flirting with Pacey. Pacey takes refuge by claiming that he and Jack are a couple. The critic says in the event that they break up, here's his card and number — and gives it to Jack. Audrey's focus on Wynn is derailed when he reveals he has a girlfriend. Steve runs into similar problems with Jen, but she is reluctant to turn him down.
98	17	"Highway to Hell"	Sanford Bookstaver	Anna Fricke	April 3, 2002	517	4.52
Charlie learns that the lead singer of his band has quit; he begs Joey to take over, as the band have a paying gig the next day. Pacey agrees to drive her and Audrey the six hours. Charlie, who overslept and missed his ride with the rest of the band, turns up needing a ride. Pacey dislikes Charlie as the latter has wronged Jen. The drive is fraught with arguments and sniping from Charlie. Meanwhile, Dawson, Jen, Jack and Grams return to Capeside for Lily's first birthday party, and Dawson is uncomfortable with his mother's friendship with Nathan (Scott Stevens), who also has a young child. Jen confesses to Jack that she wants to break up with Dawson, missing the freedom of getting to make her own choices and be spontaneous. Dawson and Jen argue. Having talked to his mother, Dawson accepts that she is interested in a man again after her husband died. Joey wows the crowd, though she requires some duet assistance from Charlie to do so. Audrey and Pacey's relationship is back on and Pacey doesn't want to drive home yet. The four of them take two rooms in a motel. Joey hands out by the pool and Charlie says he's going to bed and gives her a key to the room. Joey later goes to the room and lies down on the bed, fully clothed, with Charlie.
99	18	"Cigarette Burns"	Les Sheldon	Tom Kapinos & Jonathan Kasdan	April 10, 2002	518	4.15
Oliver tells Dawson he has arranged a screening for their movie, which is yet to be finished. Dawson freaks out, but Joey comforts him saying the movie is brilliant. At the screening, Dawson meets an attractive woman, and after exchanging insults she reveals herself to be Amy Lloyd (Meredith Salenger), movie critic for the Boston Weekly, whom Oliver secretly invited. She storms out, but Dawson convinces her to watch the movie after a heart-to-heart talk — and, after Amy glimpses her boyfriend, who just dumped her, a decoy kiss. Meanwhile, Joey is scared about her feelings towards Charlie and goes to Jen for advice. Jen, recently reunited with Jack, struggles to deal with the fact that Grams has a new boyfriend, Clifton Smalls (Afemo Omilami), an African-American Baptist. Pacey asks Audrey how many men she's slept with, and she tests his reactions by saying 27, then 57, when it was really only five.
100	19	"100 Light Years from Home"	David Petrarca	Rina Mimoun	April 17, 2002	519	3.51
It is Spring Break and the group goes to Miami to party. Audrey and Pacey go through their first relationship test when Chris Hartford (Tac Fitzgerald), Audrey's high school boyfriend and first love, shows up with tickets for the M2M concert at an MTV event. She is torn with the memories of the past, and eventually kisses Chris. Pacey stays cool about it and asks Audrey to be his official girlfriend after she confesses she loves him. Meanwhile, Dawson and Oliver drive to New York to meet a film agent who is interested in their movie; to pass the time, Dawson tells Oliver the (long and convoluted) story about his past with Joey. Oliver convinces him to turn the car south and make his case to her. But when he gets there, all he finds is a drunk and depressed Jack (who is flunking out of college) and Pacey, who tells him his story with Joey is over: Charlie has showed up, and he and Joey end up spending the night chatting in a tent.
101	20	"Separate Ways (Worlds Apart)"	Robert Duncan McNeill	Nicole Ranadive	April 24, 2002	520	3.46
Charlie's band lands a deal for a tour. He asks Joey to go with him, but she doesn't want to leave college in the middle of the semester. Charlie then decides to quit the band and stay with her; Joey begins to panic, as she feels like the relationship is moving too fast. She breaks up with him so he can go with his band on tour. Meanwhile, Oliver and Dawson finally get to NY to meet with an agent (Jack Plotnik), but Oliver ruins the meeting with his awkwardness. Dawson smooths it over by remaining behind to beg for another chance. Pacey meets the nasty new manager of Civilization, Alex Pearl (Sherilyn Fenn), who has bought the restaurant from Danny. She promotes Pacey to head chef but fires Audrey. Pacey tries to get Audrey her job back, but all he gets is a kiss from Alex. Absent: Michelle Williams, Kerr Smith
102	21	"After Hours"	Mel Damski	Jeffrey Stepakoff	May 1, 2002	521	3.64
Dawson, at the theatre to watch a movie for class, runs into Amy Lloyd, who is fleeing a disastrous date. The two end up having a one-night stand, with Amy declaring she makes judgments about impulsive sexual liaisons partially based on her date's shoes. He admits that he still harbors feelings for Joey. Dawson is stung by Amy's review of his and Oliver's picture, which she called "at times imitative, derivative, and full of unexplored potential," but Amy gives him a copy of a film which she describes the same way: Woody Allen's directorial debut, What's Up, Tiger Lily? Jack attempts to cram an entire semester's worth of advanced calculus into his head in preparation for finals, resorting to a visit back to the frat house to ask for help and/or notes; his ex-brothers turn him down, but Eric smuggles the notes out of the house and lends a hand. Audrey is offered her job back, but suspects romantic tension between Alex and Pacey, and rejects the offer; later, she drops by at Pacey's apartment and discovers him talking with Alex about their kiss. She storms out in anger, leaving the future of their relationship unknown while Pacey struggles with the growing attraction he feels for Alex. All of these people continually intrude on Joey, who is in the Worthington library attempting to study. Dawson arrives the next morning to find her asleep in an armchair. She vents about the constant interruptions preventing her from living her dream... but all Dawson wants to know is whether Joey likes his shoes. Absent: Michelle Williams
103	22	"The Abby"	Michael Lange	Diego Gutierrez & Jonathan Kasdan	May 8, 2002	522	4.31
Civilization's new investors show up and Alex, a control freak, begins insulting and firing people; Pacey leads a coup d'etat against her, and both are fired. Dawson and Joey return to Capeside, and Audrey accompanies them to avoid her parents; she learns that Dawson and Oliver have been invited to summer in LA, where a famous director wishes to mentor them. Joey receives a surprise visit from Prof. Wilder, who included her story from the start of the year (about her kiss with Dawson from the Season 4 finale) in the Worthington Literary Review. At home, she decides to see her father for the first time since his latest incarceration, only to learn that he has been paroled and didn't tell his family. Jack and Jen decide to travel to Costa Rica for a summer adventure, with Jen declining an invitation from her parents to stay with them. Dawson admits he came to Florida during Spring Break to tell Joey he loves her, and finally pays a visit to his father's grave before heading out to his future.
104	23	"Swan Song"	Greg Prange	Gina Fattore & Tom Kapinos	May 15, 2002	523	4.38
Dawson, Audrey, Jack and Jen await flights at Logan International Airport. Grams is also awaiting a flight; she's taking a 'on the sly' weekend jaunt to Las Vegas with Clifton Smalls. Dawson runs into Todd Carr, the director who fired him at the beginning of the year; Carr invites Dawson to look him up in LA. Only Joey and Pacey plan to stay in Capeside; Joey to resume her hostess job at the Yacht Club; Pacey as security guard there. Pacey runs into Danny Brecher, who reaffirms his bond with Pacey: the food industry, he claims, fits them perfectly, because they never have to grow up. Pacey looks skeptical. Joey receives a letter from Dawson, and suggests Pacey come with her to the airport so the two of them can re-unite with their respective paramours. Pacey bribes the airport's public address system worker in order to beg Audrey to forgive him. She does and the two decide to roadtrip to California together. Meanwhile, Jen decides to summer with her parents after all, and Jack is distracted by Eric, who has returned to Boston after failing to come out of the closet to his parents. Joey catches Dawson as he boards, kisses him, tells him she loves him too, but sends him to LA, promising that their futures will include each other no matter what. Finally, Joey is alone at the airport, with her passport and the ticket she bought to Paris as an excuse to get to the departure gate... but the episode closes as a grin grows across her face, suggesting she might go to Paris.

=== Season 6 (2002–03) ===
The sixth and final season of Dawson's Creek began October 2, 2002, and ended May 14, 2003, with a special two-hour series finale. The season takes place during the characters' sophomore year of college and the series finale takes place five years later. The show saw the addition of Busy Philipps as Audrey Liddell, who previously guest starred throughout the entire fifth season.

No. overall	No. in season	Title	Directed by	Written by	Original release date	Prod. code	U.S. viewers (millions)
105	1	"The Kids Are Alright"	Greg Prange	Tom Kapinos	October 2, 2002	601	5.33
Joey recaps the events of the summer: in Capeside she had a brief relationship with a cute guy; Pacey and Audrey enjoyed partying in Los Angeles; Jack, in Boston, enjoyed a summer of casual sex; Jen, in New York, was delighted to hear her parents are divorcing; and Dawson, in Los Angeles, was working hard as Todd's assistant. College starts and the group converges in Boston. Audrey and Pacey return from Los Angeles with Audrey's childhood friend Jack Osbourne. Joey has chosen a class for older students and the tutor says to take it she must read the entirety of Last Exit to Brooklyn by 3pm, but Dawson says he's in town and offers to meet at 2pm. He isn't there and when Joey gets to her class Professor Greg Hetson (Roger Howarth) is annoyed with her. Pacey decides to look for an apartment for him and Jack and finds one but the current tenant thinks he is a waste of time as he has no job. At a local bar, Joey meets waitress Emma Jones (Megan Gray), a young Englishwoman who offers her a job. It is Emma who has the great apartment. All five friends wait for Dawson, but Joey is the only one left when his taxi finally arrives. Joey reveals she had a summer romance. They dance romantically and Dawson walks her home. As Audrey has rented a hotel room to share with Pacey for their 'last night', Joey offers Dawson Audrey's bed and when she is taken aback by his birthday present, the two kiss and have sex.
106	2	"The Song Remains the Same"	Robert McNeill	Gina Fattore	October 2, 2002	602	5.33
After having sex the night before, Joey and Dawson share a sweet moment in the morning. Jen, who has discovered that Grams is in some of her classes, meets fellow student C.J. Braxton (Jensen Ackles), who recognizes her from her radio gig the prior year. He invites her to join a peer-counseling group he is part of, believing her perspective will be valuable. Pacey and Jack pursue Emma's apartment and after some cajoling (and a few good words on their behalf from Audrey), she lets them move in. Pacey interviews for a job Audrey's father arranged: a traineeship at a stock brokerage company under Rich Rinaldi (Dana Ashbrook). Joey meets Dawson at the set he has helped design for Todd's latest movie, Wicked Dead; it is a replica of the home he grew up in, and he treats Joey to a romantic dinner on the "porch" of the house. Audrey's attempt to lure them into Joey's surprise party is ruined when Dawson receives a phone call from a woman he was casually dating in LA. He explains he broke up with her by phone that morning and they were non-exclusive, but Joey sends him home, declaring their romance over.
107	3	"The Importance of Not Being Too Earnest"	Joanna Kerns	Anna Fricke	October 9, 2002	603	4.90
Joey's worst nightmare comes true when she accidentally sends a very personal e-mail to, not Dawson, but the entire student body. The next morning, Professor Hetson decides to openly debate it with his students just to further embarrass Joey for no clear reason. Meanwhile, Jack makes an attempt to get to know a little better his cultural professor, Mark Freeman (Sebastian Spence), who pays no attention to him. Pacey, while struggling to survive the first days on his new job, closes a very important deal for the firm, which Rich takes full credit for. Eddie (Oliver Hudson), a student in Prof. Hetson's class who also works as the bartender at Hell's Kitchen, persuades Joey to confront any challenge that Hetson throws and not show any weakness, since Hetson thrives on it. The final scene depicts Dawson, the only person who didn't get Joey's e-mail, attempting to write his own version of it to her, before being called away by Todd to the set.
108	4	"Instant Karma!"	Robert McNeill	Maggie Friedman	October 16, 2002	604	4.17
Dawson is commissioned to go to the airport and pick up lead actress Natasha Kelly (Bianca Kajlich); she treats Dawson dismissively, still apparently upset by the fact that he dumped her via phone. She demands that Todd fire him, and Todd — despite genuine remorse — does. Pacey, who is studying for his Series 7 exam, is forced to turn down Audrey, who wants to go out and party with Jack and Jen; he is then invited by Rich to go out on the town with company bigwigs, leading to an uncomfortable confrontation when his friends run into him on the street. Audrey, drunk to the point of impaired consent, is seduced by a random student, only to be stopped when Jen, with the help of C.J., intervenes. Jack runs into Prof. Freeman at the party, and the two bond when Freeman admits that his wife is pregnant... with an implication that Freeman is interested in more than scholarly friendship. Joey, attempting to get through Kerouac's On the Road, is dragged out by Eddie, who is making a massive Hell's Kitchen food delivery... to the set of Wicked Dead. Natasha, watching Dawson's heartbreak whilst interacting with Joey, gets Dawson his job back, realizing the damage Joey has done to Dawson is long-term and enormous. Impulsively, Joey kisses Eddie; he thanks her, but points out that she needs to resolve her feelings for Dawson first.
109	5	"The Imposters"	Michael Lange	Gina Fattore	October 23, 2002	605	3.78
Heather Tracy (Nicole Bilderback), a Hollywood producer, visits the Wicked Dead set: Todd is four days behind schedule and hasn't returned Heather's calls. (She's also still angry over him dumping her.) She identifies Natasha as the weak link and prepares to fire her; Todd is prepared to comply, prioritizing the needs of the many. As Joey presents on Lolita, Eddie defends her from Hetson's scathing critique, leading to some sort of showdown in which Eddie quits the class after being accused of utilizing a pseudonym and of being a person who doesn't exist. Emma clashes with Pacey over the fact that Audrey is constantly staying over, hogging the hot water and belting "California Dreamin'"; however, she realizes her all-girl punk band, Hell's Belles, needs a new singer. She invites Pacey to the performance, but Pacey, focused on work to the exclusion of all else, sleeps through the gig. Jack confronts Professor Freeman about a grade on a paper, feeling that Freeman's (apparently) closeted nature led him to grade unfairly; Freeman adjusts the grade, tacitly admitting Jack may have a point. Eddie, pressed by Joey, admits that he's not even a student, merely someone who sneaks into class and is allowed to audit. Dawson steps up in the editing booth, helping Todd save Natasha's job; Natasha thanks him, knowing he was behind it.
110	6	"Living Dead Girl"	Les Sheldon	Tom Kapinos	October 30, 2002	606	3.94
Dawson assists Todd in throwing a massive blow-out Halloween party on the film sound stage, complete with a live band (Murderdolls); however, Todd tells him the soundstage is haunted by the ghost of actress Melanie Ray. Audrey and Pacey, attending it, are still stricken by their cooling relationship; Audrey has not confessed to her attempt at a one-night stand, and feels that Pacey should be prioritizing his girlfriend over his job -- which Pacey, who does not have rich parents to fall back on, disagrees about. Jen, egged on by Jack, invites C.J. to the party as well; he attends... with his gay friend David (Greg Rikaart). Jen assumes C.J. is dating David, but David denies this; however, Jack learns that C.J. is simply not attracted to Jen. (He and David make plans to go out for coffee.) Joey asks Prof. Hetson to let Eddie back into the class, in exchange for a favor: babysitting his 15-year-old daughter Harley (Mika Boorem). She and Eddie take Harley to a haunted house, where sparks fly between them. Meanwhile, Pacey vents to Emma that his relationship to Audrey has become so complicated, he's no longer sure if he loves her; Audrey, overhearing, dumps him. Dawson becomes fixated on the ghost of Melanie Ray, which he believes he is seeing, and who leads him to locations where Todd and Natasha are trysting; he admits that he really likes Natasha and completely screwed things up, before quitting over Todd's apparent heartlessness. However, the two reveal that the whole thing -- not just their supposed romance, but the "ghost," which is Natasha in a wig -- was an elaborate prank. Todd refuses to accept Dawson's resignation, and Natasha takes him back.
111	7	"Ego Tripping at the Gates of Hell"	Jason Moore	Anna Fricke	November 6, 2002	607	4.38
Joey is astonished to learn that Audrey dumped Pacey, and Audrey castigates her for being an absent friend. Performing with Hell's Belles, she gets drunk, despite Eddie's too-little-too-late refusal to serve her more alcohol, and, during an enthusiastic performance of "One Way or Another," trashes the bar. This is an embarrassment to not only Joey but Jen, who had invited C.J. out in an attempt to romance him. C.J., watching Audrey's antics, speculates a deeper depression, and admits that his own experience with alcoholism is why he now refuses to date anymore. Jen, masking her hurt, accepts his rejection... but after she leaves, he crosses the street to sit with Audrey and try to console her. David, who is also at the performance, is left high and dry: Jack invited him on a date, but instead went to a book signing hosted by Professor Freeman, who will be leaving at the end of the semester; Freeman admits that he and his wife have separated, implying that Jack's encouragement of his leaving the closet has had its effect. Finally, Rich Rinaldi invites everyone who passed the Series 7 Exam, including Pacey, to New Orleans to celebrate; there, Pacey hits it off with a beautiful woman, but is shocked to discover she is a call girl whom Rich hired to jolly Pacey out of his post-breakup blues. Pacey is furious and verbally attacks Rich, who proclaims he's just trying to be a friend. Eddie, who earlier criticized Joey for her choices in supporting Audrey, apologizes, and the two agree to go on a real date. Absent: James Van Der Beek
112	8	"Spiderwebs"	Bethany Rooney	Gina Fattore	November 13, 2002	608	4.77
Courtesy of Todd, Dawson gives Jen ten tickets to a No Doubt concert in Worcester. He gets two more, with backstage passes, for himself and Natasha. Almost everyone brings a date: Dawson discovers that his tickets and backstage passes are actually for the following night. He, Natasha and Natasha's cleavage attempt to charm their way in, but are ultimately arrested and must be bailed out by Todd. Despite this, Dawson admits to having enjoyed the evening.; Joey brings Eddie, but discovers she has accidentally left the tickets in her dorm room, an hour's drive away. Eddie also attempts to charm his way backstage -- more successfully, as it turns out that his father works at the arena.; Jen brings C.J., leading to awkwardness between him and Audrey: she never called him back after their one-night stand. C.J., who is now pursuing Audrey in earnest, inadvertently admits the entire thing to Jen, who criticizes him for attempting to swoop in on her depressed and vulnerable friend.; When Pacey finds out, he starts a physical scuffle with C.J. His platonic date is Emma, who confronts him over his lingering feelings for Audrey.; Jack brings David. As the evening breaks up, Jack drives Jen home for moral support and David volunteers to help Audrey; the two bond over how unsuccessful their attempts at dating are: each of them is about to go home with a different girl.
113	9	"Everything Put Together Falls Apart"	Kerr Smith	Maggie Friedman	November 20, 2002	609	4.33
Famed movie star Max Winter (Eddie Cahill) arrives on the set of Wicked Dead to shoot his scenes and Natasha eagerly sequesters herself to rehearse with him. But she lies to Max that she has no current romantic involvements — which both Dawson and Todd overhear. Dawson plans to confront her about it — especially after seeing Max leave her hotel room — but ends up staying quiet. Meanwhile, Joey is trying to cram for Hetson's final at Hell's Kitchen (the library is packed and she can't face Audrey). Eddie offers her the use of his studio apartment. She falls asleep, and later Eddie beds down on the floor. He wakes her up at dawn. Joey says usually she goes slow and is trying to find a reason not to consummate the relationship but she can't find one, so the two enjoy a morning of sex and fall asleep ... only to wake at 11:00am! Joey is two hours late for her final. She appeals to Hetson for a second chance, but he says he must treat everyone the same and work she completed is worth a D, and therefore threatens her scholarship. Hetson visits Hell's Kitchen that evening for a meal, and openly taunts both her and Eddie, leading to the latter punching Hetson. Eddie is fired but Joey thanks him saying that Hetson deserved it. Meantime, Pacey invites Emma to an office holiday party and buys her a $300 little black dress. She modifies it to suit her punk fashion sense and still looks hot. Later, she learns that the party involves a contest: the employee who brought the hottest date will win $1,000. Emma leaves, angry and disappointed. At the flat, Pacey apologizes for deceiving her but says he still believed her to be the most attractive woman there. The two kiss but are interrupted by Jack (Kerr Smith's only on-screen appearance in the episode), who plops on the sofa and turns on the TV. Absent: Michelle Williams, Busy Philipps
114	10	"Merry Mayhem"	David Petrarca	Tom Kapinos	December 11, 2002	610	3.94
Dawson and Gail invite everyone back to Capeside for Christmas; everyone from Boston attends, with the exception of Jack, who is in Europe with Andie and their father. Pacey arrives with expensive presents, leading Doug to suspect his job is not legit. Natasha attempts to seduce Dawson in his bedroom, but he asks about her flirtation with Max Winter, and her lie. She admits she slept with him. Joey invites Eddie, but when he arrives he is questioned by Mike Potter about his career. At the Christmas dinner, a drunk Todd and an even drunker Audrey begin airing the group's dirty laundry: Jen's pain that C.J. slept with Audrey not her; Pacey and Dawson's unresolved rivalry over Joey; Dawson and Joey's unresolved feelings over finally sleeping with one another. Audrey leaves and steals Pacey's new BMW, accidentally driving it into the Leerys' living room. Pacey begs Doug to blame the incident on him; Doug, despite misgivings over letting Audrey's drinking remain unchallenged, complies. Natasha realizes that Dawson is too serious and breaks up with him. Eddie also leaves believing he should have trusted his first instincts that sharing Christmas with Joey's family was too much too soon. Absent: Kerr Smith
115	11	"Day Out of Days"	Robert McNeill	Gina Fattore	January 15, 2003	611	3.63
On a Monday in January, Todd congratulates his cast and crew for completing principal photography on Wicked Dead. Tuesday Todd is confronted by the studio's demands for re-shoots and, despite Dawson's counsel of patience, refuses. Joey, who has not heard from Eddie since Christmas, finds Harley at Hell's Kitchen; she is now living with Hetson due to her mother's work priorities, and has cut classes. Pacey, lunching at a public aquarium near his work, runs into Emma. Jen begins training as a peer counselor under C.J. Jack and David go to get tested for STDs. Wednesday Joey lets Hetson know about his daughter's truancy, and he reacts defensively. Dawson arranges a meeting with studio executives to apologize for Todd's walkout, but finds himself hired as director for the reshoots. Thursday Dawson picks up Audrey, who has been partying her life away with her friend Jack Osbourne, from a beach in Malibu. Joey, escorting Harley, stakes out Eddie's apartment; she finds it abandoned. Pacey admits his misgivings about his job to Emma, who suggests he quit his job and watch the aquarium fish feeding with her. Friday Hetson apologizes to Joey for his hostility and hires her as Harley's babysitter and tutor. Pacey chooses his job, to Emma's disappointment. Jack and David are cleared of STDs and start to explore the physical side of their relationship. Jen successfully answers her first live counseling call. Dawson tracks down Todd and apologizes for stealing his job, but Todd is fine with it.
116	12	"All the Right Moves"	Arlene Sanford	Maggie Friedman	January 22, 2003	612	3.55
Audrey begs her friends for a second chance. She is given another shot at Hell's Belles, who have a major gig that week. Alas, she relapses, getting drunk before the show starts and eventually passing out on stage. Emma throws Audrey out of the band (again). Pacey is invited to a party hosted by Roger Stepavich (Ray Wise) the founder and owner of a pharmaceutical company called Stepatech Industries where Rich promotes Pacey to be 'in charge' of the brokerage's Stepatech accounts. However, Pacey is tipped off by a mysterious woman (Sarah Shahi) that his promotion is too easy to be what it appears. Joey is assigned to clean out Eddie's locker at Hell's Kitchen. She finds a manuscript of short stories, plus his parents' home address and phone number in Worcester. Harley lies to Eddie that Joey is pregnant and he goes to see her. He explains he left because he believes his life is going nowhere and Joey would do better without him. To prove him wrong, Joey gives the manuscript to Hetson, who says it shows promise and he could arrange for Eddie to get into a writers' workshop in California. Joey convinces Eddie to take a chance and go there. She returns to her dorm room to find Audrey passed out from severe alcohol intoxication. She dials the phone for help. Absent: James Van Der Beek
117	13	"Rock Bottom"	Robert McNeill	Tom Kapinos	January 29, 2003	613	3.10
In Los Angeles, while directing re-shoots on "Wicked Dead", Dawson finds his authority questioned when Natasha refuses to do a nude scene and the cameraman challenges Dawson's choice of shots. As a result, Dawson adopts a take-no-prisoners attitude to take control of the situation. In Boston, Jen consoles a dumped Grams, and Jen and C.J. set Grams up with C.J.'s Uncle Bill (Geoffrey Lewis), who turns out to be rude but able to make Grams laugh. Eddie is accepted to the writers' workshop and is moving to California. Joey asks him to drive Audrey to a rehab clinic en route. The three of them, plus a guy named Bob (Seth Rogen) whom Audrey slept with on a wild night out, begin a cross-country drive. Bob and Audrey steal Eddie's car when they stop for gas. Later, Joey rescues a drunken Audrey from sexual violence outside a bar. Audrey, having hit rock bottom, says she is ready to go into rehab. Natasha has one last night with Dawson, he agrees their relationship was based on sex not love, and the two bid each other amicable farewells. Absent: Joshua Jackson, Kerr Smith
118	14	"Clean and Sober"	Michael Lange	Anna Fricke	February 5, 2003	614	3.45
In Los Angeles, Dawson visits Audrey at the rehab clinic where he spots big-time film producer Toni Stark (Alicia Coppola) and follows her into a therapy session in the hopes of networking, but the whole scheme backfires. Meanwhile, in Boston, Pacey throws a party at his place to celebrate his new success at his job; he also purchases a wide-screen TV. Emma invites a local stoner punk named Gus (Esteban Powell) and introduces him as her fiancé; she admits that she has dropped out of school due to the success of Hell's Belles, but now needs a marriage of convenience to retain her visa. Joey, still sulking over the departure of Eddie, lets loose by getting drunk and setting up a spontaneous game of spin the bottle. Joey is flirtatious with Pacey the whole night and they almost kiss during the game, but they are interrupted when Gus accidentally destroys the massive TV. Pacey carries a drunk Joey to his room so she can rest, and before leaving, he admits to her that he never got over her. Joey drunkenly leans over to kiss him. Jen catches the reformed alcoholic C.J. with a drink, which leads to them arguing; but they are commissioned to kiss during the Spin the Bottle game, and they end up having sex for the first time. Jack offers to marry Emma in Gus's stead; though grateful, she turns him down and decides to return to England for good.
119	15	"Castaways"	Greg Prange	Gina Fattore	February 12, 2003	615	4.24
After agreeing to go with Pacey to a business party and witnessing him flirt with another girl the whole night, Joey demands to be taken home. When Pacey stops at a local Kmart for condoms, they are accidentally locked inside the store overnight. The two are forced to discuss their past and current relationship: they feel uncomfortable talking about sex with each other, they never discuss their past and they never had closure. In an intimate moment, Joey shaves off his goatee beard; afterwards, Pacey goes in for a kiss, confirming what he confessed when she was drunk the previous episode. As they bed down for the night in camping equipment, Joey admits to a fantasy she had when they summered aboard True Love: being castaways on an idyllic island, living their love away from everyone. They share a bittersweet kiss after her confession and they quietly leave when the store opens in the morning. Absent: James Van Der Beek, Michelle Williams, Kerr Smith, Busy Philipps
120	16	"That Was Then"	Perry Lang	Anna Fricke	March 26, 2003	616	3.05
Professor Hetson asks Joey to baby-sit for Harley to make sure she does her homework; but Joey ends up serving as relationship counselor when she finds Harley's boyfriend, Patrick (Taylor Handley), hiding in the house. Patrick starts to drool over Joey which makes Harley jealous. Meanwhile, Dawson pays a visit to his past when he's asked to speak to Mr. Gold's class at Capeside High about how it is to be working in L.A. One of the students, George (Lukas Behnken), asks Dawson to watch his film, leading Dawson to realize that he's moved on from the teenager he once was. Pacey also returns to Capeside when his father is admitted to the hospital after suffering a heart attack. Pacey has an argument with his brother, Doug, about the way Pacey's been treating the family by shutting them out. He ends up at Dawson's house to check on the repairs after Audrey's incident over Christmas, and Dawson invites him in to renew their friendship. Absent: Michelle Williams, Kerr Smith, Busy Philipps
121	17	"Sex and Violence"	Frank Perl	Anna Fricke & Tom Kapinos	April 2, 2003	617	3.26
Joey, on spring break for the next two weeks, accepts Rich's offer to be Pacey's temporary secretary, but shows a complete lack of professionalism. This is exacerbated when a local newspaper reporter, named Sadia Shaw, arrives to interview Pacey, and he recognizes her as the attractive woman from the Stepatech party five episodes ago. Their mutual jealousy ends the only way it can: with a tryst in Pacey's office. Meanwhile, Dawson enlists Heather Tracy's help in pitching his next film to studio head Larry Newman (Paul Gleason), who cares primarily about sex; Dawson's pitch, a chaste coming-of-age story loosely modeled on his romance with Eve, mutates into a sex comedy entitled "Sunset Stripped." Dawson consults with Todd for advice, and Todd suggests he stick to his guns; as a result, though Newman greenlights the movie, Dawson refuses the director's position. Pacey fires Joey on grounds of being too attracted to her, and the two agree to meet at Pacey's apartment... only for Eddie to walk in as the bar closes. Absent: Kerr Smith, Busy Philipps
122	18	"Love Bites"	Bethany Rooney	Liz W. Garcia	April 9, 2003	618	3.39
Jen's seemingly happy world comes crashing down when she learns that Grams has breast cancer. Meanwhile, Joey's tumultuous love life continues when Eddie begs her to go back to California with him, and Pacey agrees to join Joey as she chaperones for Harley's school dance, but what should be a magical night doesn't feel right for Joey. Feeling too scared to jump back into a relationship with Pacey, she goes back to Eddie. Although he is at first reluctant, Pacey agrees to invest Dawson's life savings to finance his new film project. Dawson, living at home to save money, is grilled on his backup plans by Gail; Dawson admits he has none, because he has no intention of failing to achieve his dream, and Gail agrees to stand by him. Absent: Kerr Smith, Busy Philipps
123	19	"Lovelines"	Joshua Jackson	Jason M. Palmer	April 16, 2003	619	3.12
Eddie confronts Joey over her unwillingness to have sex with him. David is hurt when Jack lets Fred (Matt Funke), who had earlier flirted with him before finding out the two were involved, sit in a seat which Jack had been reserving for David. Jen, feeling overwhelmed by the reality of Grams' cancer, dumps C.J. All of this is played out on stage as Boston Bay College hosts Loveline personalities Drew Pinsky and Adam Carolla (playing themselves), and all three relationships are placed under the radio show's microscope. Jen admits that her self-destructive behavior is causing her to implode her relationship in fear; Adam reminds Eddie that he abandoned Joey twice, and that her unwillingness to trust him is entirely reasonable; David gives Jack an ultimatum: apologize or dump him. The only person to get her way is Audrey, who shared a plane with Pinsky while returning to Boston and spends the episode stalking him, resulting in her being abandoned at the venue after Eddie and Joey resolve their issues and rush back to her empty dorm room; Pinsky offers Audrey a ride home. Absent: James Van Der Beek, Joshua Jackson, Mary Beth Peil
124	20	"Catch–22"	Robert McNeill	Laura Glasser	April 23, 2003	620	3.47
Pacey learns he has lost all of his as well as Dawson's money in the stock market after unwisely investing all of it in the Stepatech bio-tech stock that just went bust after a public FDA rejection of Stepatech's "miracle flu" drug. Sadia Shaw then breaks up with Pacey after telling him that she and her former boyfriend have decided to get back together. After work, things turn from bad to worse for Pacey when he privately asks his boss Rich Rinaldi to borrow $18,000 to refund Dawson's money, but Rinaldi refuses. Frustrated and angry after Rinaldi insults Pacey one too many times by calling him a loser, Pacey physically attacks Rinaldi and is immediately fired. Meanwhile, Joey passes her English final with an 'A−', which earns her a C+ average grade for the class, and is relieved that her long ordeal with the insufferable Professor Hetson is over. However, Joey later tells Hetson that she wants him as her adviser when she decides to choose English as her major. Elsewhere, Eddie surprises Joey with a trip to Europe for the summer, but a fiery conversation about how differently they live their lives leaves both of them questioning their future together. Eddie ends up breaking up with Joey with a letter. Also, David finally breaks up with Jack, who ponders if he was only with David to prove to himself that he could hold a steady relationship.
125	21	"Goodbye, Yellow Brick Road"	Peter Kowalski	Anna Fricke	April 30, 2003	621	3.80
Joey returns to Capeside to find Dawson's script on her doorstep and is overwhelmed that he has written a story about three friends. She spends the day with Dawson rebuilding their friendship. Later that evening, Dawson's movie-making dreams are shattered when the broke and unemployed Pacey arrives and comes clean about losing all of Dawson's money. The ensuing verbal fight opens old wounds, and Dawson finally articulates why he has struggled to forgive Pacey all these years for the constant bad luck and the bad choices that Pacey has made. Dawson, Pacey and Joey somberly part ways, believing their friendships will never be the same again. Also, with classes at Worthington over, Joey says goodbye to Audrey, who has to stay behind to attend summer school classes. Wanting to resume her music career, Audrey, with friend Jack Osbourne helping her, takes the stage at Hell's Kitchen, alone and sober to sing a low-key song with only an acoustic guitar. Elsewhere, Jen invites her mother, Helen (Mimi Rogers), over to Grams' house where she wants her to tell Helen about her cancer. However C.J.'s Uncle Bill arrives and inadvertently reveals Grams' cancer to everyone. Jen suggests that she, Grams and Jack all move in with Helen in NYC, where Grams can get the best medical care available, and the others agree.
126	22	"Joey Potter and the Capeside Redemption"	Michael Lange	Gina Fattore & Tom Kapinos	May 7, 2003	622	4.88
Pacey and Jack move out of their Boston apartment and go their separate ways. Jack moves in with Jen and Grams, and Pacey moves back to Capeside and in with his brother Doug, who does not hide his contempt and disappointment in Pacey after he tells Doug the truth about losing his job and all of his money. Also in Capeside, when a depressed Dawson gives up his dream of making his film, his soulmate and first producer Joey refuses to accept it. She takes it on herself to rally a crew: Jack and Jen act as production assistants, Audrey agrees to take on the role inspired by Ms. Jacobs, and Joey herself acts as casting director, convincing Harley to play the Joey role, Patrick the Pacey role and George, Dawson's admirer from earlier in the season, to play Dawson; Todd also drops in to operate the Steadicam and act as director of photography, while Doug Witter shows up to provide security. Pacey begins to make amends to Dawson by begging the businesses of Capeside to invest in a budding young filmmaker. Jen, Jack and Grams say their goodbyes and leave for New York. Confident that she has gotten Dawson back on his feet and rejuvenated their friendship, Joey leaves Capeside for good to pursue her dream of traveling to Paris.
127 128	23 24	"All Good Things......Must Come to an End"	James Whitmore Jr.	Kevin Williamson & Maggie Friedman	May 14, 2003	623 624	7.30
Five years have passed, and everyone, now aged 25, is reunited in Capeside for a special wedding. Dawson has been living in Los Angeles producing his autobiographical television series The Creek. Joey is now a book editor living in New York City with her boyfriend, Christopher (Jeremy Sisto). Pacey has reopened the Icehouse Restaurant. Jen is a single mom living with Grams in New York and managing an art gallery in SoHo. And Jack is an English teacher at Capeside High, and is in a relationship with Doug, now sheriff of Capeside, though the latter is unwilling to publicly come out of the closet. Absent is Audrey, who is singing backup for John Mayer, touring Europe, and has a boyfriend she dubs the 'anti-Pacey'. The five friends catch up over dinner; later, Joey ends up at Dawson's house, like always. They catch up, and Joey spends the night because Dawson insists, while also leaving before he wakes up. During Gail's wedding, Jen collapses while dancing with Dawson and is sent to the hospital, where it is revealed that she is dying of heart failure. They all get turns to say goodbye to Jen, as it is her wish they are not sad and instead joke about the matter at hand. Later, Dawson helps Jen make a video for her infant daughter, asking her to never stop loving and dreaming and to believe in God because it is good to have something to believe in. Joey comforts him as he struggles to come to terms with Jen's fading health. As her dying wish, Jen begs Joey to stop running and put everyone out of their misery by making a choice between Dawson and Pacey, since they both are evidently still in love with her. Jack, whom Jen named godparent to her daughter Amy, insists on adopting Amy. Jen later passes away with Grams by her side. Jen's death forces everyone to grow up and stop running. Doug tells Jack he's willing to spend his life with him and wants to help raise Amy. Pacey tells Joey that, despite his endless love for her, he feels like he is holding her back, as she has fulfilled her dreams of leaving Capeside, where he feels like he is destined to be stuck. She tells him that she loves both him and Dawson in different ways and calls Dawson her soulmate. Before she can clarify, they are interrupted by Gail and then Bessie. Joey checks in on Dawson, who is lost in memories of Jen's first day on the Creek. They reconfirm the survival and significance of their love and vaguely defined relationship... then declare each other their soulmates. Joey tearfully tells Dawson she loves him, which he reciprocates. “You and me... always.” “Always.” EPILOGUE. Sometime later, it is revealed that Pacey and Joey are living together in New York, finally back together. They delightedly call Dawson after watching the season finale of his show. The three converse happily, apparently having reconciled their dynamic. Dawson tells them that he is going to be meeting his idol, Steven Spielberg, the next day, much to Pacey and Joey's delight. The three converse as the camera pans to a photograph of the three with Jen, and the show fades to footage of the "Core Four" on the beach all those years ago. In 2011, the whole two-part finale was ranked #16 on the TV Guide Network special, TV's Most Unforgettable Finales. Absent: Busy Philipps

== Ratings ==
Dawson's Creek : U.S. viewers per episode (millions)

Season	Episode number																								Average
Season	1	2	3	4	5	6	7	8	9	10	11	12	13	14	15	16	17	18	19	20	21	22	23	24	Average
1	6.75	8.04	7.34	6.48	8.04	7.34	7.52	7.50	7.05	7.12	7.26	7.80	7.89	–											7.39
2	7.93	7.26	7.75	5.96	5.88	6.95	6.42	6.76	6.62	6.80	6.43	6.16	6.19	6.84	6.93	6.45	6.42	5.26	5.25	6.17	5.23	6.32	–		6.45
3	6.05	5.39	5.83	4.92	4.34	4.47	5.26	4.05	4.37	3.96	3.42	4.10	4.18	3.42	4.38	4.00	4.45	4.11	4.00	3.86	4.73	3.93	4.83	–	4.44
4	4.98	5.37	5.02	5.04	5.20	5.64	4.54	4.68	4.96	4.24	4.87	4.49	4.54	5.10	3.95	4.00	3.25	4.13	4.15	4.32	4.78	5.45	4.85	–	4.68
5	4.47	4.99	4.40	4.48	3.77	4.50	3.41	4.19	3.99	4.21	3.75	4.31	4.13	4.38	4.03	3.98	4.52	4.15	3.51	3.46	3.64	4.31	4.38	–	4.13
6	5.33	5.33	4.90	4.17	3.80	3.94	4.38	4.77	4.33	3.94	3.66	3.55	3.10	3.45	4.24	3.05	3.26	3.39	3.12	3.47	3.80	4.88	7.30	7.30	4.13

Audience measurement performed by Nielsen Media Research
