= Goodbye Yellow Brick Road (disambiguation) =

Goodbye Yellow Brick Road is a 1973 album by Elton John.

Goodbye Yellow Brick Road may also refer to:

- "Goodbye Yellow Brick Road" (song), the title track from the Elton John album
- "Goodbye, Yellow Brick Road" (Dawson's Creek), a 2003 television episode
- "Goodbye Yellow Brick Road" (FlashForward), a 2010 television episode
