= Georgia Film Academy =

- Other names: GFA
- Motto: We Make Makers
- Type: educational and professional
- Established: 2015
- Director: Scott Votaw
- Academic staff: 40
- Students: 2,000 per year
- Location: Atlanta, Georgia, U.S.
- Website: georgiafilmacademy.edu

The Georgia Film Academy (GFA) is a not-for-profit entertainment arts program based in Atlanta, Georgia. It is a collaboration of the University System of Georgia and the Technical College System of Georgia created in 2015 by Georgia state leadership to meet education and workforce needs for high-demand careers in Georgia's film and creative industries.

== Mission and history ==
The GFA offers professional training to prepare students for union-covered film and television and post-production production craft internships and placement in creative industries, apprenticeships, and jobs.

The GFA High School Initiative offers training to high school teachers in GFA-developed courses. High School teachers receive training in current methodologies and equipment used in motion picture production, along with training in how to teach Avid Media Composer editing and dramatic writing on the high school level. The dramatic writing course meets the U.S. Department of Education standards for English language arts and theater.

== Partner Institutions ==
GFA started with three campuses — Clayton State, Gwinnett Tech and Southern Crescent, and has expanded to 24 partner colleges and universities across the state of Georgia. Students sign up within their college and then take classes at one of these GFA locations: Trilith Studios in Fayetteville; OFS Studios in Norcross. Tyler Perry Studios trains students as well. A typical class is one day a week for six hours. Successful students are placed on a paid internship. Currently, 75 percent of GFA students receive one-semester internships. GFA program graduates receive a GFA production certification card after completing the three courses required for the certificate.

== Academics ==
GFA courses include Intro to On-set Film Production, Set Construction & Scenic Painting, Lighting & Electric, Grip & Rigging, Editing with Avid Media Composer 100, Media Composer 200 and Pro Tools, Special Makeup Effects, Production Accounting & Office Management, Production Design, and Motion Picture Set Lighting.

In 2020, the GFA partnered with the University of Georgia (UGA) to offer film programs with the UGA Masters of Fine Arts.

== History ==
The Georgia state legislation created tax incentives for production companies in 2002, and then boosted these credits again in 2008. A film production company that meets the requirements can receive up to 30% back in Georgia State tax credits.

To create more local jobs in the film industry, Governor Nathan Deal worked with the Georgia legislature in 2015 to set aside an appropriation, administered by the Board of Regents, to create and fund GFA. The Board of Regents appointed Atlanta native Jeffrey Stepakoff to be executive director the same year and GFA began offering courses in January 2016: Introduction to On-Set Film Production and an accompanying internship program. The two programs were initially offered on the campuses of Clayton State University, Gwinnett Tech and the Southern Crescent Technical College. Twenty GFA interns were used for the first time for the production of Krystal (film), starring William H. Macy, in March 2016.

In June 2016, Stepakoff negotiated an arrangement with IATSE to allow GFA interns to train/intern in union covered crafts where they would be able to work under experienced union members on production sets.

The GFA has issued over 1,000 certificates since its founding in 2016.

== See also ==
- Film industry in Georgia (U.S. state)

== Sources ==
- Savannah Tech teams up with Georgia Film Academy for on-set production assistant program By Ann Meyer, Savannah Morning News, Jan 24, 2019
- Atlanta Tech, Ga. Film Academy to make more movie magic By Noreen Cochran, South Metro Neighbor, March 2, 2018
- UGA announces MFA film program with Pinewood Forest By Ryan Dennis, WXIA-TV, Atlanta, December 10, 2019
- How the Georgia Film Academy plans to keep Hollywood in the South By Max Blau, Atlanta Magazine, April 27, 2016
