= Jeffrey Stepakoff =

Jeffrey Stepakoff is an American television writer, producer, and author.

== Education ==
After graduating from Woodward Academy in College Park, Georgia in 1981, Stepakoff earned a degree in journalism from the University of North Carolina at Chapel Hill. After graduation, he began working at an advertising agency. He graduated from Carnegie Mellon University with a Master of Fine Arts in playwriting in 1988. He teaches at Kennesaw State University as Associate Professor of Screenwriting since 2006.

== Career ==
Stepakoff's ticket to television writing came through a Carnegie Mellon contact who was involved with ER. The contact helped introduce him to an agent and David Milch, creator of "Deadwood" and NYPD Blue. The 1988 Writers Guild of America strike prevented Stepakoff from working right away. Although he was offered a job as a scab writer for CBS's Charles in Charge, produced by Universal Television, he turned it down. When the strike ended, he was offered another job by Universal to write for Simon & Simon. In 2015 Jeffrey Stepakoff was appointed the Executive Director of the Georgia Film Academy.

== Credits ==
His credits include Zoe Busiek: Wild Card (hired by Lynn Marie Latham), Major Dad, Dawson's Creek, Tarzan, Hyperion Bay, "C-16: FBI", "Flipper", "Sisters (Creative Consultant), "The Wonder Years", "Major Dad", and "Simon & Simon". Stepakoff also created pilots for 20th Century Fox, Paramount Pictures, MTM, Fox and ABC. He developed and wrote major motion pictures, including Disney's Tarzan and Brother Bear.

== Awards/Nominations/Publications ==
=== Books ===
His book BILLION-DOLLAR KISS: The Kiss That Saved Dawson’s Creek and Other Adventures in TV Writing, a revealing account of his experiences in the television industry, is a critically acclaimed one.

==== Fiction ====
- Fireworks Over Toccoa, St. Martin's Press, 2010
- The Orchard, St. Martin's Press, 2011
- The Melody of Secrets, St. Martin's Press, 2013

=== Membership ===
Stepakoff is a member of the Writers Guild of America, the Writers Guild of Canada, the Screen Actors Guild, and IATSE, and is a voting member of the Academy of Television Arts and Sciences. He currently resides with his wife and children in Dunwoody, Georgia.
