= Blue-collar crime =

Criminal offenses committed by the lower social classes

In criminology, blue-collar crime is any crime committed by an individual from a lower social class as opposed to white-collar crime which is associated with crime committed by someone of a higher-level social class. While blue-collar crime has no official legal classification, it holds to a general net group of crimes. These crimes are primarily small scale, for immediate beneficial gain to the individual or group involved in them. This can also include personal related crimes that can be driven by immediate reaction, such as during fights or confrontations. These crimes include but are not limited to: Narcotic production or distribution, sexual assault, theft, burglary, assault or murder.

== Etymology ==
Blue-collar crime is a term used to identify crime, normally of a small scale nature in contrast to “white-collar crime”. During the 1910s through to the 1920s in America, manual labourers often opted for blue shirts, so that stains gained from days at work were less visible. As during that time period and geographic location manual labour was often or almost exclusively assigned to the lower classes, the term was more permanently attributed to them as defining low income earners. This has carried on to the modern day, therefore meaning crime typically committed by lower classes. Blue-collar crime does not exclusively address low income earners in work, but also includes the unemployed who are also members of the lower classes.

== Causes ==
A dominant explanation for why people turn to crime is economic need and specifically unemployment. The unemployed are defined as persons above a specified age who, during the reference period, were without work, were currently available for work, and were seeking work -- according to The International Conference of Labour Statisticians.

The process of industrialisation encouraged working-class incorporation into society with greater social mobility being achieved during the twentieth century. But the routine of policing tends to focus on the public places where the economically marginal live out more of their lives, so regulation falls on those who are not integrated into the mainstream institutions of economic and political life. A perennial source of conflict has therefore involved working-class youth but, as long-term structural unemployment emerged, an underclass was created. Ralf Dahrendorf argues that the majority class did not need the unemployed to maintain and even increase its standard of living, and so the condition of the underclass became hopeless. Box (1987) sums up the research into crime and unemployment at pp96–7:

The relationship between overall unemployment and crime is inconsistent. On balance the weight of existing research supports there being a weak but none-the-less significant causal relationship. However, properly targeted research on young males, particularly those from disadvantaged ethnic groups, which considers both the meaning and duration of unemployment, has yet to be done. The significance of unemployment will vary depending on its duration, social assessments of blame, previous experience of steady employment, perception of future prospects, comparison with other groups, etc. Hence, there is likely to be a causal relationship between relative deprivation and crime, particularly where unemployment is perceived as unjust and hopeless by comparison with the lot of other groups. Thornberry and Christenson (1984) analysed data from a longitudinal cohort study of delinquency in Philadelphia and found (at p405):
Unemployment exerts a rather immediate effect on criminal involvement, while criminal involvement exerts a more long-range effect on unemployment. What this and other empirical research demonstrates is that crime-rates, especially for property offences, were higher during periods of unemployment than of employment. This suggests that holding constant other variables, the same youths commit more crimes while unemployed. This is not surprising since unemployment provides an incentive to commit offences and erodes the social controls which would otherwise encourage conformity. But crime also rose during the so-called period of affluence, prompting the Right Realism of James Q. Wilson and his associates in the United States who argued that the criminal justice system was failing, and the Left Realism attributed to Jock Young, which argued for situational changes to reduce the availability of criminal opportunities in the environment. More generally, the growth of anomie (see Durkheim and, more recently, the Strain Theory proposed by Merton), predicted a strong correlation between unemployment and property crime. But Cantor and Land (1985) found a negative association for unemployment and property crime in the United States. They argued that unemployment decreases the opportunity for property crime since it reflects a general slowdown in.

However, there is an explanation for this correlation between unemployment and tendencies towards crime. A study found that both social standing in the classes and the employment status of offenders found them more likely to be detained, arrested and prosecuted by Law Enforcement. Further it came to the conclusion that unemployed persons were more likely to be dealt harsher punishments, and be looked upon unfavourably by the justice system, based on their employment status.

Conservatism alleges the failure of state agencies charged with the task of socialisation to instil self-discipline and moral values resulting in permissiveness, a lack of conformity, and liberalisation. The "evidence" that there are new affluent criminals allows populist politicians to deny any link between inner-city deprivation and crime. The left avoids the issue of morality and crime which denies earlier work in Marxist criminology linking crime and the culture of egoism stimulated by economic advance under capitalism as a more amorally materialistic culture emerges. As Durkheim asserted, moral education cannot be effective in an economically unjust society. Thus, additional research is required, using a more complex model of crime and control to include variables such as opportunities or incentives relative to a country's standard of living, potential punishment, chance of being caught, law enforcement efforts and expenditures on theft and property crime relative to other crimes, size of the country's criminal population, education levels, and other socio-economic factors. A further factor currently being researched is the role of the media in the social construction of "hot spots" or dangerous places within a city. Crime is a substantial element in media news reporting. Media research is now determining whether the coverage of crime is spatially representative of where crime occurs, or disproportionately presents crime as occurring in certain areas of a city, thereby skewing public perceptions and the political response (see Paulsen: 2002).

In Australia a study undertaken, focusing on Aboriginal Australians, researched into the varying crime rates between similar communities. Some of these communities that they compared lived in both similar geographically and demographically. What they found was that the offence rate was likely tied to a cultural aspect of the community that existed. They found that the upbringing of families to their youngers, as well as how the community developed, has a far larger effect on blue-collar related crimes than employment or income.(McCausland & Vivian, 2010).

Rather than unemployment being the sole or a primary contributing factor towards crime rates, there is evidence pointing towards a greater set of factors that can even contribute towards unemployment itself. According to this study the factors that lead to crime should be collected into different clusters: personality of the individual, family, school, peers and work.
