= Riddick (film) =

2013 film by David Twohy

- Theatrical release poster
- Directed by: David Twohy
- Written by: David Twohy
- Based on: Characters by Jim Wheat; Ken Wheat
- Produced by: Vin Diesel; Ted Field
- Starring: Vin Diesel; Jordi Mollà; Matt Nable; Katee Sackhoff; Dave Bautista; Bokeem Woodbine; Raoul Trujillo; Karl Urban
- Cinematography: David Eggby
- Edited by: Tracy Adams
- Music by: Graeme Revell
- Production companies: One Race Films; Radar Pictures; Riddick Canada Productions
- Distributed by: Universal Pictures
- Release date: September 6, 2013
- Running time: 119 minutes
- Countries: United States; Canada
- Language: English
- Budget: $38 million
- Box office: $98.3 million

Riddick is a 2013 science fiction action film written and directed by David Twohy, based on the character Richard B. Riddick by Jim and Ken Wheat. It is the third installment in The Chronicles of Riddick film series and a sequel to The Chronicles of Riddick (2004). Vin Diesel reprises his role as the titular character alongside Jordi Mollà, Matt Nable, Katee Sackhoff, Dave Bautista, Bokeem Woodbine, Raoul Trujillo, and Karl Urban. In the film, notorious murderer Riddick is betrayed and left for dead on a desolate planet and uses his instincts to survive. He eventually teams up with mercenaries arriving to capture him to escape from a larger threat.

Riddick was released in the United States on September 6, 2013. It received mixed reviews from critics, but became a moderate box-office success. A fourth film, entitled Riddick: Furya, is in development.

== Plot ==
Five years after Kyra's death, (Note: As depicted in The Chronicles of Riddick) Riddick has become uneasy in his role as Lord Marshal of the Necromonger fleet. His refusal to swear into the Necromonger faith has caused dissent among his subjects. After an attempt on his life, Riddick strikes a deal with Commander Vaako: the location of Furya and a ship to take him there, in exchange for Vaako succeeding him as the next Lord Marshal. Led by Vaako's aide, Krone, Riddick and a group of Necromongers arrive on a desolate planet. Realizing that it is not Furya, Riddick kills most of his escorts when they attempt to assassinate him; Krone causes a landslide and buries Riddick alive.

Riddick emerges from the rubble with a broken leg, which he sets and splints while fending off native predators, including giant venomous scorpion-like water-dwelling Mud Demons. After taking time to heal, Riddick notices a vast savanna beyond some rocky cliffs, but the only passage through is impeded by several muddy pools infested with Mud Demons. Injecting himself with Mud Demon venom to build an immunity and constructs improvised melee weapons, as well as raising and training an orphaned jackal-beast pup, he kills the Mud Demons blocking his entrance and reaches the savanna. After finding a mercenary station, Riddick notices a series of approaching storms and concludes they will unleash a dangerous threat. Riddick activates an emergency beacon at the station, which broadcasts his identity to mercenary groups within the area.

Two ships arrive in response; the first led by violent and unstable Santana, with second-in-command Diaz, preacher Luna, and hunters Falco, Rubio, Vargas, and Nuñez; the second led by Colonel R. "Boss" Johns, second-in-command and marksman Dahl, tracker Lockspur and gunner Moss. Riddick leaves them a message promising they will all die unless they leave one of their ships and depart the planet on the other. Rubio, Nuñez, and Falco are killed by Riddick during the first night, forcing a reluctant Santana to cooperate with Johns's team. Riddick later steals power nodes from each of the teams' ships and approaches Johns and Santana to strike a deal for their return. However, the conversation becomes an ambush as Dahl shoots Riddick with several rounds of horse tranquilizer, and Riddick's jackal-beast is shot and killed by Santana.

At the station, Johns interrogates Riddick about the fate of his son, William. (Note: As depicted in Pitch Black) When the storms reach the station, Riddick's threat is revealed as thousands of Mud Demons emerge from hibernation underground, awakened by the rainwater, and besiege the station, killing Lockspur and Moss. Johns agrees to release Riddick to locate the hidden power cells, but Santana attempts to kill Riddick because he is worth more dead than alive and because Riddick promised to kill Santana if set free. Riddick, with one leg free, beheads Santana with his own machete. The group then releases Riddick on the condition he retrieves the nodes and each party gets a ship.

They fight their way to the ships, and Vargas is killed by a Mud Demon. Johns, Diaz, and Riddick leave the ship together on the hoverbikes to retrieve the power nodes. During their journey, Diaz crashes Johns's bike over an embankment, but Riddick saves him. After they reach the power nodes, Riddick reveals Johns's son's morphine addiction and his attempts to use a child as bait. Diaz attacks Riddick and Johns, but Riddick fights and kills him; as Diaz dies, he shoots and disables the last hoverbike.

Riddick and Johns fend off an endless horde of Mud Demons while running back to the station. Riddick is severely wounded, and Johns takes both nodes and abandons him. Riddick begins to fight the advancing Demons and climbs a rock spire; when it seems he is about to be killed, Johns arrives in a repowered ship and shoots the creatures while Dahl descends to rescue Riddick. Given the other ship, Riddick praises Johns for being a better man than his son and departs into deep space.

Alternative Ending

In the director's cut, Riddick gets back on the Necromonger capital ship and confronts Krone, who is seen worshipping a large hole in space surrounded by gas demanding to know where Vaako is. Krone explains to Riddick that Vaako is no longer among them and that Vaako honoured his word to Riddick, and that he betrayed both of them because the Necromongers can't be led by a kind hearted man. Riddick kills Krone and goes over to a woman and asks her is Vaako alive or dead, she replies both. Riddick looks out into space and Vaako's voice is heard saying transcendences.

== Cast ==
- Vin Diesel as Richard B. Riddick, last of the Furyan race and notorious criminal outlaw. Riddick lets himself get complacent in his time as Lord Marshal and is suddenly forced to rediscover his animal side to survive.
- Matt Nable as Colonel R. "Boss" Johns, a professional mercenary whose son William J. Johns was killed during the events of Pitch Black. Johns pursues Riddick in order to get answers about how his son died. He prides himself on being an organized professional and runs his crew efficiently.
- Jordi Mollà as Santana, a bounty hunter whose crew is the first to arrive in pursuit of Riddick. He bristles at the arrival of Johns and refuses to accept help until he has no choice.
- Katee Sackhoff as Dahl, Johns's Lieutenant. She is a tough and capable mercenary, and the crew's sniper. She and Santana instantly dislike each other and she is forced to assert herself over him after Johns puts her in charge of Santana's crew.
- Dave Bautista as Diaz, Santana's Lieutenant. He is quiet and reserved in contrast to the loud and obnoxious Santana, but makes snide remarks at times.
- Bokeem Woodbine as Moss, one of Johns's crew who has a quiet encounter with Riddick that leaves him shaken.
- Raoul Trujillo as Lockspur, a member of Johns's crew who has encountered the mud creatures before.
- Conrad Pla as Vargas, one of Santana's men who is highly superstitious and paranoid.
- Nolan Gerard Funk as Luna, a Christian whom Santana refers to as his good luck charm. The voice of reason, he repeatedly tries to convince everyone to take Riddick's offer and leave rather than fight.
- Danny Blanco Hall as Falco, member of Santana's crew.
- Noah Danby as Nuñez, member of Santana's crew.
- Neil Napier as Rubio, member of Santana's crew.
- Karl Urban as Commander Siberius Vaako, a Necromonger Commander who desires the position of Lord Marshal.
- Alex Branson as Lex Branman.
- Andreas Apergis as Krone, a Necromonger who betrays Riddick and leaves him to die.

Additionally, singer Keri Hilson makes a cameo appearance as Santana's prisoner, who was being kept as a sexual slave and is eventually killed by him after Luna cuts her loose.

== Production ==
=== Development ===
Rumors of a third film in the Chronicles of Riddick series had circulated since 2006. At first, Twohy assumed that the film would be an independent, low-budget production, rather than being released by Universal Studios as the other films in the series had been. Despite the second film's tepid reception, Diesel and Twohy remained optimistic about a third film, pushing it toward completion. "Everyone knows I love the Riddick character and I'm always working on it," Diesel asserted. "It just takes five years to make another one because David Twohy and I are so precise about it." In 2006, Diesel agreed to make a cameo in Universal's film The Fast and the Furious: Tokyo Drift in exchange for the ownership to the rights to the Riddick franchise and character. Over the next four years, Diesel periodically posted information on his own Facebook page updating fans on the film's progress. In November 2009, shortly after Twohy had finished the script, he announced that pre-production work was underway.

In April 2010, a review of the Riddick screenplay (it was then subtitled "Dead Man Stalking") appeared on the Coming Attractions website. "Free from the constraints of delivering a PG-13 movie, the dialogue in Dead Man Stalking is more suited to a film like Training Day; the mercs we meet are hard-living people, not those washout fakeout space mercs from a film like Alien Resurrection", wrote reviewer Patrick Sauriol. On February 9, 2010, Diesel confirmed in an update on his Facebook page that one of the locations used in the upcoming sequel would be the White Desert in Farafra, Egypt. He mentioned the terrain features, unique to the area, would lend to the off-planet atmosphere of the film. On March 13, 2011, Diesel released a video on his official Facebook page in which he and Director David Twohy talk about the proposed third film. They reaffirmed that the movie will be rated 'R', like the first one (Pitch Black), a priority for them, and they plan to shoot it lean and quickly.

In September 2011, it was announced that Karl Urban would reprise his role as Vaako from The Chronicles of Riddick. In January 2012, it was announced that Katee Sackhoff and Matt Nable had also joined the cast. Since they did not have enough money to shoot the film in its entirety, Diesel had to mortgage his house, obtain loans and spend most of his personal money on the production of the film, "I had to leverage my house," Diesel said. "If we didn't finish the film, I would be homeless."

=== Filming ===
The first image of Vin Diesel on the film's set was released on January 20, 2012. Filming began in January 2012 and concluded at the end of March 2012. The film entered post production in April 2012. The teaser trailer for the film was released on March 22, 2013, via Vin Diesel's official Facebook page.

== Release ==
=== Home media ===
Riddick was released on DVD and Blu-ray on January 14, 2014. The film grossed an additional $23,026,441 through domestic DVD and Blu-ray sales.

==== Differences in plot from theatrical release ====
A number of additions to the plot are included in the director's cut of the movie which was released on Blu-ray and DVD on January 14, 2014. and provided a longer story than the theatrical version. The extended cut of the movie is approximately eight minutes longer than the theatrical version and includes extended and additional scenes not seen in the theatrical version.

In the extended version, there is an additional scene that takes place aboard the Necromonger capital ship where Riddick kills Krone and finds out that Vaako has crossed the threshold into the Underverse, seen as a large hole in space surrounded by gas. Riddick looks out the window as he is told that Vaako has gone to achieve transcendence, where he is both dead and alive.

== Reception ==
=== Box office ===
Riddick grossed $42,025,135 in North America, and $56,312,160 in other countries, for a worldwide total of $98,337,295. In North America, the film opened to number one in its first weekend, with $19,030,375. In its second weekend, the film dropped to number three, grossing an additional $6,841,800. In its third weekend, the film dropped to number eight, grossing $3,656,620. In its fourth weekend, the film dropped to number 13, grossing $1,607,145.

=== Critical response ===
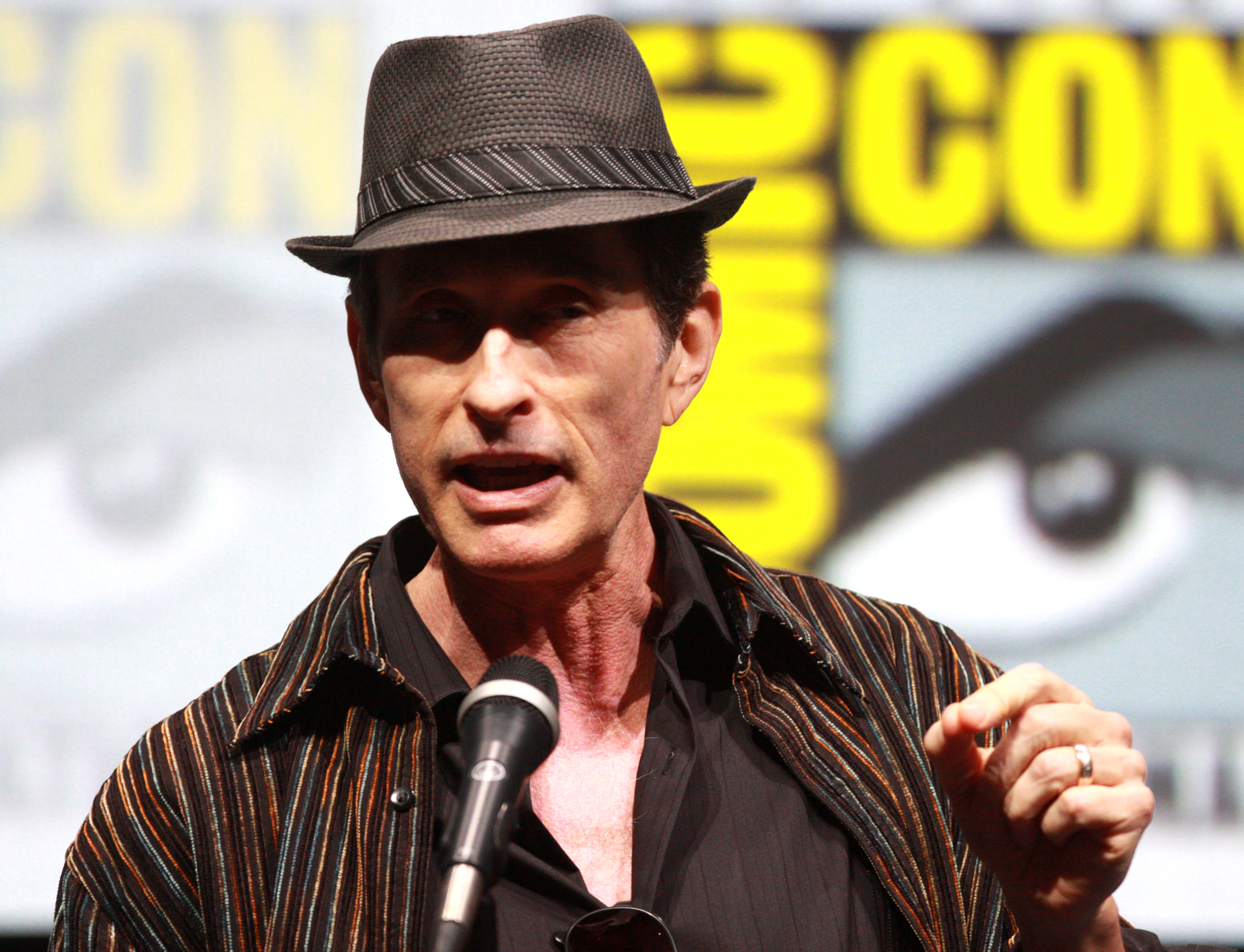
David Twohy promoting Riddick at the 2013 San Diego Comic-Con

On the review aggregator website Rotten Tomatoes, 58% of 173 critics' reviews are positive, with an average rating of 5.4/10. The website's consensus reads: "It may not win the franchise many new converts, but this back-to-basics outing brings Riddick fans more of the brooding sci-fi action they've come to expect." Metacritic, which uses a weighted average, assigned the film a score of 49 out of 100, based on 35 critics, indicating "mixed or average" reviews. Audiences polled by CinemaScore gave the film an average grade of "B" on an A+ to F scale.

Alonso Duralde of TheWrap gave the film a negative review, saying "If you were to make a comedy about an actor who makes cheesy sci-fi action movies, and you needed a hilarious clip of his work that underscored the awfulness of his output, just about any 30-second segment of Riddick would do the trick". Tom Huddleston of Time Out gave the film two out of five stars, saying "It's flavourless: the aliens are unscary and easily despatched, Vin's too silent to be interesting, and the other characters are either dull or offensive". Scott Foundas of Variety gave the film a positive review, saying "An improbable but very enjoyable sequel that recaptures much of the stripped-down intensity of Diesel and director David Twohy's franchise starter Pitch Black." Justin Lowe of The Hollywood Reporter gave the film a negative review, saying "Faithful to the template if not the spirit of previous installments, this flabby second sequel barely manages to advance Riddick's considerable personal mythology". Keith Staskiewicz of Entertainment Weekly gave the film a C+, saying "Twohy succeeds in staging moments both tense and funny, but they're fewer and farther between than one would hope, and the dialogue is served up with a heaping helping of cheese, especially when delivered in Diesel's low-frequency growl". In his review for RogerEbert.com, Odie Henderson gave the film 2-1/2 stars, noting that "the absurd level of Riddick love is the film's most entertaining characteristic", and describing Dahl as "a super-butch lesbian who provides Riddick with naked boobs".

== Sequel ==
On January 29, 2014, Diesel had announced on his Facebook page that Universal wishes to develop a fourth Riddick film prompted by robust DVD sales of the most recent film in the series.

In April 2016, Diesel confirmed that he and Twohy were developing a fourth Riddick movie titled Furya and a spin-off TV series titled Merc City. In May 2016, he explained that production on Furya may begin in early 2017. In a video Diesel asked, "Are you guys excited to hear about Furya? Do you want to know where it all began with that dark character Riddick?" David Twohy confirmed that the new film would be rated R. The posts did not elaborate on how, if at all, Merc City would be connected to the upcoming film.

By July 2019, the script was completed and the title was changed to Riddick: Furya. The story focuses on the protagonist finally returning to his homeworld, a place he barely remembers and one he fears might be left in ruins by the Necromongers. Once there, he finds other Furyans fighting for their existence against a new enemy.

By May 2022, it was reported that Twohy had rewritten the screenplay alongside original creators Jim and Ken Wheat and that it was completed in 2021. In May 2022, an Instagram post from Vin Diesel also suggested that pre-production has moved on to the storyboarding phase. Shooting was previously scheduled for late 2023 with film release in 2024 or 2025 at the earliest. The fourth installment, now simply titled Riddick: Furya, was officially announced in February 2023.

In May 2024, it was announced that Riddick: Furya would begin production on 26 August 2024 and that the film would shoot in Germany, Spain and the U.K., with David Twohy attached to direct. Samantha Vincent and Diesel will be producers.
