= The Chronicles of Riddick (franchise) =

Science fiction horror and action media franchise

- Logo
- Created by: David Twohy; Wheat Brothers
- Original work: Pitch Black (2000)
- Owner: Universal Pictures
- Years: 2000–present

Print publications
- Novel(s): Pitch Black (2000); The Chronicles of Riddick (2004)
- Comics: Pitch Black: Slam City (2000); Riddick: Blindsided (2013)

Films and television
- Film(s): Pitch Black (2000); The Chronicles of Riddick (2004); Riddick (2013); Riddick: Furya (TBA)
- Short film(s): The Chronicles of Riddick: Dark Fury (2004)
- Television special(s): Into Pitch Black (2000)

Games
- Video game(s): The Chronicles of Riddick: Escape from Butcher Bay (2004); The Chronicles of Riddick: Assault on Dark Athena (2009); Riddick: The Merc Files (2013)

The Chronicles of Riddick is an American science fiction-horror and action media franchise created by brothers Ken and Jim Wheat and later continued by writer-director David Twohy. It follows the adventures of antihero character Riddick (either portrayed or voiced by Vin Diesel) in the 28th century.

The film series began with the release of Pitch Black (2000), which was written by director Twohy and brothers Ken and Jim Wheat from a story by the latter brothers. Since then, Twohy has solely written and directed two sequels, The Chronicles of Riddick (2004) and Riddick (2013), and was involved in the development of the storyline of a number of the series' offshoots.

In addition to the feature films, The Chronicles of Riddick fictional universe includes an animated short film and several video games, motion comics, and novelizations. A fourth film, entitled Riddick: Furya, is in development.

== Films ==
Film	U.S. release date	Director(s)	Screenwriter(s)	Story by	Producer(s)
Pitch Black	February 18, 2000	David Twohy	Jim Wheat, Ken Wheat & David Twohy	Jim Wheat & Ken Wheat	Tom Engelman
The Chronicles of Riddick	June 11, 2004	David Twohy	David Twohy	David Twohy	Vin Diesel & Scott Kroopf
Riddick	September 6, 2013	David Twohy	David Twohy	David Twohy	Ted Field & Vin Diesel
Riddick: Furya	TBA	David Twohy	David Twohy	David Twohy	Vin Diesel, Lars Sylvest, Joe Neurauter, Samantha Vincent & Thorsten Schumacher

=== Pitch Black (2000) ===
Riddick is transported to prison on the Hunter Gratzner, a commercial cargo spaceship. When the craft is damaged in the wake of a comet and makes an emergency crash landing on an isolated desert planet, Riddick escapes. However, when flying creatures begin attacking all the survivors, Riddick joins forces with the others to escape the planet.

After the release of the sequel titled The Chronicles of Riddick, this film has been referred to as The Chronicles of Riddick: Pitch Black in subsequent home video re-releases.

=== The Chronicles of Riddick (2004) ===
Five years after the events of Pitch Black, Riddick evades bounty hunters and learns of a warrior army known as "The Necromongers". He is captured and sent to the prison planet Crematoria, where he reunites with Jack from the first film. Riddick escapes and battles with the Necromonger fleet, which ends with the defeat of the Lord Marshal and Riddick taking his place.

=== Riddick (2013) ===
In 2006, Vin Diesel agreed to make a cameo in Universal's film The Fast and the Furious: Tokyo Drift in exchange for the ownership to the rights to the Riddick character. Encouraged by high DVD sales and Diesel's newly restored box office success, David Twohy wrote a script for a third film in the Riddick series. The film was produced by Media Rights Capital and distributed by Universal, and was released on September 6, 2013.

Betrayed and left for dead by the Necromongers on a desolate planet, Riddick is forced to fight for survival against alien predators. He eventually realizes that an approaching storm will kill him and he must rely on mercenaries to escape.

=== Riddick: Furya (TBA) ===
In January 2014, Diesel announced on his Facebook page that Universal wished to develop a fourth Riddick film, again prompted by robust DVD sales of the most recent film in the series. In April 2016, Vin Diesel confirmed that he and writer-director David Twohy were developing a fourth Riddick movie titled The Chronicles of Riddick: Furya. In May 2016, he explained that production on The Chronicles of Riddick: Furya may begin in early 2017. In a video, Vin Diesel asked: "Are you guys excited to hear about Furya? Do you want to know where it all began with that dark character Riddick?". David Twohy confirmed that the new film would be rated R. On 21 July 2019, Diesel announced on his Instagram that he had received Twohy's script for Riddick 4: Furya. In May 2022, an Instagram post from Vin Diesel also suggested that pre-production has moved on to the storyboarding phase. The film was officially announced as Riddick: Furya in February 2023 with Twohy set to write and direct, and Diesel set to reprise his role.

== Short animated film ==
=== The Chronicles of Riddick: Dark Fury (2004) ===
Dark Fury, an anime-inspired made-for-DVD animated film, acts as a bridge between the live-action films of Pitch Black and The Chronicles of Riddick. It takes place shortly after Pitch Black and involves Riddick and the other two survivors of Pitch Black, Jack and Imam, and their run-in with a mercenary ship, as well as its captain who wishes to keep Riddick frozen as part of her collection of warriors from around the universe. It received mixed reviews.

== Video games ==
=== The Chronicles of Riddick: Escape from Butcher Bay (2004) ===
Escape from Butcher Bay is a video game based on the Riddick series, released for the Xbox and Windows PC. It acts as a prequel to Pitch Black, and involves Riddick's escape from the eponymous prison, Butcher Bay. It was well received and is often listed among the greatest video games.

=== The Chronicles of Riddick: Assault on Dark Athena (2009) ===
Assault on Dark Athena is a video game for the PlayStation 3, Xbox 360, Windows, and Mac OS X computers. It includes an enhanced remake of Escape from Butcher Bay, and covers events between the previous game and Pitch Black. Reviews were mostly positive.

=== Riddick: The Merc Files (2013) ===
Riddick: The Merc Files is a touch-based stealth action game for Android and iOS devices. It was developed by Gaming Corps, a game developer founded by some of the original developers of the previous Riddick games.

== Television ==
=== Into Pitch Black (2000) ===
Into Pitch Black is a Syfy (formerly The Sci-Fi Channel) special which takes place before and after the events of Pitch Black. It mixes clips from Pitch Black into sequences focusing on a psychologist who studied Riddick in prison, the doctor who gave him his "eyeshine" ability, and a Lawman hiring a female mercenary to track Riddick months after Pitch Black. It shows several inconsistencies with the official storyline of the later sequels and video games and is non-canonical.

=== Future ===
In June 2004, David Twohy announced that he was writing the story basis for a SyFy television film/pilot episode for a proposed television series based on the Riddick character Kyra.

In December 2015, Diesel announced on his Instagram account that both he and Twohy developed a TV series titled Merc City that will follow the Mercs and Bounty Hunters of the Riddick franchise.

== Novels ==
Pitch Black and The Chronicles of Riddick have received novelizations of their scripts, by Frank Lauria and Alan Dean Foster respectively. These expand on elements of the films, most notably Pitch Black providing character backstory for Riddick and The Chronicles of Riddick describing the Necromongers and their religion in greater detail.

- Pitch Black (2000)
- The Chronicles of Riddick (2004)

== Motion comics ==
=== Pitch Black: Slam City (2000) ===
Pitch Black: Slam City is a short motion comic prequel to Pitch Black by animator Brian Murray with David Twohy which had been available for download at the Pitch Black website. Slam City is in the form of an official, confidential prison record detailing Riddick's arrival and escape from the Ursa Luna Slam City facility, in eleven hours and twenty-two minutes. Notably, it shows Riddick undergoing the surgery that gives him "eyeshine"—the ability to see in the dark—and paying for this with a pack of Kool cigarettes, as mentioned in Pitch Black. William J. Johns is seen at the end of the film being charged with capturing Riddick.

=== Riddick: Blindsided (2013) ===
Riddick: Blindsided is a motion comic based on storyboarded scenes of the third film that didn't make the theatrical cut. It takes place shortly before the events of Riddick and bridges that film with the previous one. The director's cut of Riddick reinserts most of the material covered in Blindsided back into the film. It was released online a month before the release of the third film to generate buzz and it is also included with the movie's home video release.

== Cast and crew ==
=== Cast ===
Character	Films			
Character	Pitch Black	The Chronicles of Riddick: Dark Fury	The Chronicles of Riddick	Riddick
Character	2000	2004	2004	2013
Richard B. Riddick	Vin Diesel	Vin Diesel	Vin Diesel	Vin Diesel
Jack B. Badd / Kyra	Rhiana Griffith	Rhiana Griffith	Alexa Davalos	
Abu "Imam" al-Walid	Keith David	Keith David	Keith David	
Carolyn Fry	Radha Mitchell			
William J. Johns	Cole Hauser			
Paris P. Ogilvie	Lewis Fitz-Gerald			
Sharon "Shazza" Montgomery	Claudia Black			
John "Zeke" Ezekiel	John Moore			
Greg Owens	Simon Burke			
Alexander Toombs		Nick Chinlund	Nick Chinlund	
Junner		Roger L. Jackson		
Antonia Chillingsworth		Tress MacNeille		
Siberius Vaako			Karl Urban	Karl Urban
Zhylaw / Lord Marshal			Colm Feore	
Aereon			Judi Dench	
Dame Vaako			Thandiwe Newton	
Purifier			Linus Roache	
The Guv			Yorick van Wageningen	
Lajjun			Kim Hawthorne	
Eve Logan			Christina Cox	
Colonel R. "Boss" Johns				Matt Nable
Santana				Jordi Mollà
Dahl				Katee Sackhoff
Diaz				Dave Bautista
Moss				Bokeem Woodbine
Lockspur				Raoul Trujillo
Vargas				Conrad Pla
Luna				Nolan Gerard Funk
Krone				Andreas Apergis

=== Crew ===
Role	Film			
Role	Pitch Black	The Chronicles of Riddick	Riddick	Riddick: Furya
Role	2000	2004	2013	TBA
Director	David Twohy	David Twohy	David Twohy	David Twohy
Producer(s)	Tom Engelman	Vin Diesel & Scott Kroopf	Vin Diesel & Ted Field	Vin Diesel & Samantha Vincent
Writer(s)	Ken Wheats, Jim Wheats & David Twohy	David Twohy	David Twohy	David Twohy
Composer(s)	Graeme Revell	Graeme Revell	Graeme Revell	TBA
Cinematographer(s)	David Eggby	Hugh Johnson	David Eggby	TBA
Editor(s)	Rick Shane	Tracy Adams, Martin Hunter & Dennis Virkler	Tracy Adams	TBA
Production company(s)	Gramercy Pictures; Interscope Communications; Polygram Filmed Entertainment	Radar Pictures; One Race Films	Radar Pictures; One Race Films	TBA
Distributor	USA Films	Universal Pictures	Universal Pictures	Universal Pictures
Runtime	109 minutes	135 minutes	119 minutes	TBA
Release date	February 18, 2000	June 11, 2004	September 6, 2013	TBA

== Characters ==
- Richard B. Riddick (Vin Diesel), more commonly known as Riddick, is the protagonist of the series. He is shown to be a highly skilled predator, extremely mobile and stealthy, has a vast knowledge of how to kill almost any humanoid in a variety of ways, is an extreme survivalist, and is notoriously hard to contain. He is also self-admittedly a dangerous convict and murderer, yet despite this, he is sometimes shown to perform moral or even atypically heroic actions, usually against his own better judgment and survivalist nature. Riddick is a Furyan, a member of a warrior race obliterated by a military campaign that left Furya desolate, and is one of the last of his kind. One of his most defining features are his eyes, a characteristic inherent in a certain caste of his species (The Alpha-Furyans), although he implies in Pitch Black that they were "shined" by a back-alley surgical operation. This allows him to see in the dark with no difficulty at all, but also renders his eyes incredibly sensitive to concentrated light, therefore he wears tinted welding goggles for protection. Riddick was once a mercenary, then part of a security force, and later on a soldier. He is also an experienced pilot.
- Carolyn Fry (Radha Mitchell), is a docking pilot for the commercial transport ship Hunter-Gratzner. She has a moment of moral weakness during the emergency landing attempt, intending to sacrifice the ship's passenger section to save herself. A relationship develops between Fry and Johns, until she finds out who he really is. the group, now down to Riddick, Fry, Jack and Imam, finds shelter inside a cave not far from the settlement. Riddick leaves them there and takes the power cells to the dropship. Inside the cave, they discover bio-luminescent worms, which they stuff in bottles to use as light. Fry leaves the cave and finds Riddick powering up the ship, ready to leave without them. She pleads with him to help her rescue the others, but instead he just offers to take her with him. Eventually, Riddick has a change of heart, and they return for Imam and Jack and take them to the ship, but Riddick is separated from the group and wounded by the predators. Fry goes back to help Riddick but is killed after finding him.
- William J. Johns (Cole Hauser) is a war veteran and mercenary who was trusted to track down Riddick after he escaped from Slam City and the primary human antagonist of Pitch Black. He captured Riddick and brought him to Butcher Bay, but upon discovering that he could not get as much of a reward as he wanted, helped Riddick escape. The Johns Chase Log on the Pitch Black special features tells of the events afterward: Riddick stabs Johns and leaves him for dead. Johns becomes a morphine addict after having it prescribed to him because of the wound, and then chases Riddick down while also avoiding other mercenaries on Riddick's trail. He eventually catches Riddick on the planet Aquila Major (featured in the opening scene of Chronicles of Riddick) by killing two children and threatening to kill two more unless Riddick surrenders. He gets a seat on the transport vessel Hunter Gratzner, which crashes onto Hades in Pitch Black. After the crash, Johns convinces the survivors to help him hunt down Riddick. Johns initially disbelieves Riddick’s claims of the bio-raptors. After their discovery, Johns makes a deal with Riddick, so they could work together to survive. Riddick ultimately betrays Johns when Johns decides to use Jack as bait for the bio-raptors, resulting in Johns and Riddick fighting. Johns is defeated and left to the bio-raptors, one of which attacks Johns and rips him apart.
- Abu "Imam" al-Walid (Keith David) is an Imam who was looking for New Mecca when the Hunter-Gratzner crashed in Pitch Black. He was traveling with three young boys and despite everything he went through, including the deaths of the boys, he never lost his faith and believed there was goodness in Riddick. Imam was one of the three survivors of the first movie along with Jack and Riddick.
- Jack B. Badd/Kyra (Rhiana Griffith and Alexa Davalos) is a character from the first two Riddick movies (See above). In Pitch Black she went by the name Jack after the crash of the Hunter-Gratzner and pretended to be a boy so that everyone would take her seriously. Jack befriended Riddick and was enamoured by him. In Chronicles of Riddick, it is revealed that Riddick left her with Imam behind on Helion Prime. Wanting to find Riddick, she joined a mercenary crew, got caught and got sent to one of the worst prisons in existence: Crematoria. According to what she told Riddick later, she did what he said in an attempt to get the eye-shine like him: she killed a few people, got sent to a prison where it's said you can never escape from but couldn't find a doctor that could do an eye-shine.
- Siberius Vaako (Karl Urban) is a Necromonger Commander from The Chronicles of Riddick, serving as Zhylaw's right-hand man. Though sent to kill Riddick, confused of his leader's sudden fear, Vaako uses it as an excuse to get close enough to assassinate Zhylaw to become Lord Marshal. However, once the chance to kill Zhylaw presents itself, Riddick beats Vaako to the punch and becomes Lord Marshal. But when Riddick eventually renounces the title and gives it to him in exchange to for an escort to take him to Furya, unbeknownst to Vaako, instead of Furya, his lieutenant takes Riddick to the planet where Riddick takes place and tries to assassinate him as the lieutenant disagrees with what he perceives to be a weakness on the part of Vaako.
- Alexander Toombs (Nick Chinlund) is the mercenary from Chronicles of Riddick and Dark Fury. Toombs is shown to be highly arrogant and incompetent, failing to capture Riddick and having his ship stolen from him, and once again being humiliated during Riddick's escape from Crematoria. Toombs was last seen locked inside the Crematoria kennels surrounded by vicious guard dog-creatures. His current status is unknown, but it can be assumed that he was never rescued and is most likely dead.
- Zhylaw or Lord Marshal (Colm Feore) is the main antagonist of Chronicles of Riddick. Before Riddick's birth, Zhylaw consulted an Elemental seer, who told him that a Furyan male would be born that would kill him in the future. In retaliation, Zhylaw attacked Furya in an attempt to massacre all male children, going so far as to personally strangle newborn infants with their own umbilical cords. He strangled Riddick with his umbilical cord and believed him dead but Riddick actually survived. At some point, he traveled to the Underverse and afterwards returned not completely human. He is referred to by the Necromongers as the "Holy Half-Dead" and possesses powers such as incredible strength, the ability to pull souls from bodies and to separate his soul partially from his body and then pull his body where his soul is, resulting in a kind of super-speed that makes him hard to hit.
- Shirah (Kristin Lehman) is a Furyan seen in the Director's Cut of The Chronicles of Riddick. and the video game The Chronicles of Riddick: Escape from Butcher Bay.
- Purifier (Linus Roache) was a member of the Necromonger fleet. It is revealed that he, too, was Furyan like Riddick, before being converted. When Riddick falls unconscious after fighting the Necromonger soldiers chasing him, the Purifier pulls him into the safety of the hangar and tells Riddick, "We all began as something else". Regretting what he has done under a faith he did not believe in, the Purifier tells Riddick that the Furyan in him hopes that Riddick goes after the Lord Marshal, before committing suicide by walking into the sunlight of Crematoria.
- Pope Joe (Willis Burks II) is a hermit, and former Bovine Veterinarian, that lives in the sewers of Butcher Bay. After Riddick retrieved his radio from the sewers, he heals Riddick, and is credited with giving him his "eyeshine" that he uses throughout the franchise to see in the dark, but may not be the actual source, as the prior information comes from the 2004 videogame The Chronicles of Riddick: Escape from Butcher Bay, which may or may not be canon.
- R. "Boss" Johns (Matt Nable) is William J. John’s father and a mercenary, who seeks revenge on Riddick for his son's death.

== Reception ==
=== Box office performance ===
Film	Release date	Box office gross			Production budget	Reference
Film	Release date	North America	Other territories	Worldwide	Production budget	Reference
Pitch Black	February 18, 2000	$39,240,659	$13,947,000	$53,187,659	$23 million	
The Chronicles of Riddick	June 11, 2004	$57,761,012	$58,011,721	$115,772,733	$105 million	
Riddick	September 6, 2013	$42,025,135	$56,312,160	$98,337,295	$38 million	
Total		$139,026,806	$128,270,881	$267,297,687	$166 million	

=== Critical and public response ===
Film	Rotten Tomatoes	Metacritic	CinemaScore
Pitch Black	59% (109 reviews)	49 (29 reviews)	—N/a
The Chronicles of Riddick	29% (164 reviews)	38 (34 reviews)	B
Riddick	58% (172 reviews)	49 (35 reviews)	B
