= 2nd British Academy Games Awards =

Game award ceremony in 2005

- Date: 1 March 2005
- Location: Café Royal
- Hosted by: Jonathan Ross
- Best Game: Half-Life 2
- Most awards: Half-Life 2 (6)
- Most nominations: Half-Life 2 (8)

The 2nd British Academy Video Games Awards, awarded by the British Academy of Film and Television Arts, was an award ceremony held on 1 March 2005 at Café Royal in London. The ceremony honoured achievement in 2004 and was hosted by Jonathan Ross. Half-Life 2 was the major winner on the night, taking six out of the eight awards available.

== Winners and nominees ==
Winners are shown first in bold.

**Action Game**: **Half-Life 2 – Valve/Valve**; Grand Theft Auto: San Andreas – Rockstar North/Rockstar Games; Halo 2 – Bungie/Microsoft Game Studios; Metroid Prime 2: Echoes – Retro Studios and Nintendo/Nintendo; Ratchet & Clank: Up Your Arsenal – Insomniac Games/Sony Computer Entertainment; The Chronicles of Riddick: Escape from Butcher Bay – Starbreeze Studios and Tigon Studios/Vivendi Universal Games	**Original Music**: **Hitman: Contracts – Jesper Kyd, IO Interactive/Eidos Interactive**; Evil Genius – James Hannigan; Fable – Danny Elfman and Russell Shaw, Big Blue Box Studios and Lionhead Studios/Microsoft Game Studios; Forgotten Realms: Demon Stone – Stormfront Studios and Zono/Atari; Harry Potter and the Prisoner of Azkaban – Jeremy Soule, Griptonite Games, KnowWonder and EA UK/Electronic Arts; Rome: Total War – Jeff van Dyck, The Creative Assembly/Sega
**Animation**: **Half-Life 2 – Valve/Valve**; Grand Theft Auto: San Andreas – Rockstar North/Rockstar Games; Halo 2 – Bungie/Microsoft Game Studios; Jak 3 – Naughty Dog/Sony Computer Entertainment; Killzone – Guerrilla Games/Sony Computer Entertainment; Onimusha 3: Demon Siege – Capcom/Capcom	**Originality**: **SingStar/SingStar Party – London Studio/Sony Computer Entertainment**; Animal Crossing – Nintendo EAD/Nintendo; Donkey Konga – Namco/Nintendo; Fable – Big Blue Box Studios and Lionhead Studios/Microsoft Game Studios; Second Sight – Free Radical Design/Codemasters; Sid Meier's Pirates! – Firaxis Games/Atari
**Art Direction**: **Half-Life 2 – Valve/Valve**; Burnout 3: Takedown – Criterion Games/Electronic Arts; Doom 3 – id Software/Activision; Killzone – Guerrilla Games/Sony Computer Entertainment; Onimusha 3: Demon Siege – Capcom/Capcom; Prince of Persia: Warrior Within – Ubisoft Montreal/Ubisoft	**PC**: **Half-Life 2 – Valve/Valve**; Doom 3 – id Software/Activision; Far Cry – Crytek/Ubisoft; Myst IV: Revelation – Ubisoft Montreal/Ubisoft; Rome: Total War – The Creative Assembly/Sega; The Sims 2 – Maxis/Electronic Arts
**Audio Achievement**: **Call of Duty: Finest Hour – Spark Unlimited/Activision**; Doom 3 – id Software/Activision; DJ Decks & FX: House Edition – Relentless Software/Sony Computer Entertainment Europe; Forgotten Realms: Demon Stone – Stormfront Studios and Zono/Atari; Manhunt – Rockstar North/Rockstar Games; SingStar/SingStar Party – London Studio/Sony Computer Entertainment	**PS2**: **Burnout 3: Takedown – Criterion Games/Electronic Arts**; Call of Duty: Finest Hour – Spark Unlimited/Activision; EyeToy: Play 2 – London Studio/Sony Computer Entertainment; Grand Theft Auto: San Andreas – Rockstar North/Rockstar Games; SingStar/SingStar Party – London Studio/Sony Computer Entertainment; Tom Clancy's Ghost Recon 2 – Red Storm Entertainment/Ubisoft
**Best Game**: **Half-Life 2 – Valve/Valve**; FIFA Football 2005 – EA Canada/Electronic Arts; Football Manager 2005 – Sports Interactive/Sega; Grand Theft Auto: San Andreas – Rockstar North/Rockstar Games; Halo 2 – Bungie/Microsoft Game Studios; Pro Evolution Soccer 4 – Konami Computer Entertainment Tokyo/Konami	**Racing**: **Burnout 3: Takedown – Criterion Games/Electronic Arts**; FlatOut – Bugbear Entertainment/Empire Interactive; Mario Kart: Double Dash – Nintendo EAD/Nintendo; Need for Speed: Underground 2 – EA Black Box/Electronic Arts; RalliSport Challenge 2 – Digital Illusions CE/Microsoft Game Studios; WRC 4 – Evolution Studios/Sony Computer Entertainment Europe
**Children's**: **Donkey Konga – Namco/Nintendo**; EyeToy: Groove – London Studio/Sony Computer Entertainment; EyeToy: Play 2 – London Studio/Sony Computer Entertainment; Shrek 2 – Luxoflux/Activision; SingStar/SingStar Party – London Studio/Sony Computer Entertainment; Sly 2: Band of Thieves – Sucker Punch Productions/Sony Computer Entertainment	**Sports**: **Pro Evolution Soccer 4 – Konami Computer Entertainment Tokyo/Konami**; FIFA Football 2005 – EA Canada/Electronic Arts; Mario Golf: Advance Tour – Camelot Software Planning/Nintendo; Tiger Woods PGA Tour 2005 – EA Sports/Electronic Arts; Tony Hawk's Underground 2 – Neversoft/Activision; WRC 4 – Evolution Studios/Sony Computer Entertainment Europe
**GameCube**: **Prince of Persia: Warrior Within – Ubisoft Montreal/Ubisoft**; Donkey Konga – Namco/Nintendo; Mario Kart: Double Dash – Nintendo EAD/Nintendo; Metroid Prime 2: Echoes – Retro Studios and Nintendo/Nintendo; Second Sight – Free Radical Design/Codemasters; Tiger Woods PGA Tour 2005 – EA Sports/Electronic Arts	**Sunday Times Reader Award for Games**: **Football Manager 2005 – Sports Interactive/Sega**; FIFA Football 2005 – EA Canada/Electronic Arts; Grand Theft Auto: San Andreas – Rockstar North/Rockstar Games; Half-Life 2 – Valve/Valve; Halo 2 – Bungie/Microsoft Game Studios; Pro Evolution Soccer 4 – Konami Computer Entertainment Tokyo/Konami
**Handheld**: **Colin McRae Rally 2005 – Codemasters/Codemasters**; Fire Emblem – Intelligent Systems/Nintendo; Harry Potter and the Prisoner of Azkaban – Griptonite Games/Electronic Arts; Pokémon FireRed and LeafGreen – Game Freak/The Pokémon Company; Star Wars Trilogy – Traveller's Tales/LucasArts; The Legend of Zelda: The Minish Cap – Capcom and Flagship/Nintendo	**Technical Direction**: **Burnout 3: Takedown – Criterion Games/Electronic Arts**; Doom 3 – id Software/Activision; EyeToy: Play 2 – London Studio/Sony Computer Entertainment; Half-Life 2 – Valve/Valve; Metroid Prime 2: Echoes – Retro Studios and Nintendo/Nintendo; Pikmin 2 – Nintendo EAD/Nintendo
**Mobile**: **BlueTooth BiPlanes – Morpheme Wireless Ltd/Morpheme Wireless Ltd**; 3D Pool – 3R Studio/3R Studio; Ancient Empires – Macrospace/Macrospace; Colin McRae Rally 2005 – Codemasters/Codemasters; Fatal Force: Earth Assault – Macrospace/Macrospace; Tiger Woods PGA Tour 2005 – EA Sports/Electronic Arts	**Xbox**: **Halo 2 – Bungie/Microsoft Game Studios**; Burnout 3: Takedown – Criterion Games/Electronic Arts; Fable – Big Blue Box Studios and Lionhead Studios/Microsoft Game Studios; Grand Theft Auto: Double Pack – Rockstar North and Rockstar Vienna/Rockstar Games; The Chronicles of Riddick: Escape from Butcher Bay – Starbreeze Studios and Tigon Studios/Vivendi Universal Games; Tom Clancy's Ghost Recon 2 – Red Storm Entertainment/Ubisoft
**Online Multiplayer**: **Half-Life 2 – Valve/Valve**; Burnout 3: Takedown – Criterion Games/Electronic Arts; Far Cry – Crytek/Ubisoft; Halo 2 – Bungie/Microsoft Game Studios; Ratchet & Clank: Up Your Arsenal – Insomniac Games/Sony Computer Entertainment; Tom Clancy's Splinter Cell: Pandora Tomorrow – Ubisoft Shanghai and Ubisoft Milan/Ubisoft

=== Special Award (Games) ===
- **Sam Houser**
- **Leslie Benzies**

=== Games with multiple nominations and wins ===
==== Nominations ====
Nominations	Game
8	Half-Life 2
6	Burnout 3: Takedown
6	Halo 2
5	Grand Theft Auto: San Andreas
4	Doom 3
4	SingStar/SingStar Party
3	Donkey Konga
3	EyeToy: Play 2
3	FIFA Football 2005
3	Metroid Prime 2: Echoes
3	Pro Evolution Soccer 4
3	Tiger Woods PGA Tour 2005
2	Call of Duty: Finest Hour
2	Colin McRae Rally 2005
2	Far Cry
2	Football Manager 2005
2	Forgotten Realms: Demon Stone
2	Harry Potter and the Prisoner of Azkaban
2	Killzone
2	Mario Kart: Double Dash!!
2	Onimusha 3: Demon Siege
2	Prince of Persia: Warrior Within
2	Rome: Total War
2	Second Sight
2	The Chronicles of Riddick: Escape from Butcher Bay
2	Tom Clancy's Ghost Recon 2
2	WRC 4

==== Wins ====
Awards	Game
6	Half-Life 2
3	Burnout 3: Takedown
