= One Race Films =

American film and multimedia production company

- Type: Private
- Industry: Film
- Founded: 1995; 31 years ago
- Founder: Vin Diesel
- Headquarters: Los Angeles
- Area served: Worldwide
- Key people: Vin Diesel
- Subsidiaries: Tigon Studios; Racetrack Records
- Website: www.oneracefilms.com

One Race Films, also known as One Race Productions, is an American production company founded by actor Vin Diesel in 1995. It has produced a total of 15 films, all of which star Diesel, who also founded its subsidiaries Tigon Studios to create video games and Racetrack Records to release music.

As of 2024, One Race's feature films have grossed $6 billion worldwide, with an average gross per film of $686 million. The company's films, especially the Fast & Furious franchise, rank among the highest-grossing of all time; the franchise itself is among the highest-grossing of all time. Its films are typically distributed by Universal Pictures.

== Filmography ==
=== Film ===
Title	Director(s)	Release date	Notes	Ref.
The Chronicles of Riddick	David Twohy	June 11, 2004		
Find Me Guilty	Sidney Lumet	March 17, 2006		
Babylon A.D.	Mathieu Kassovitz	August 29, 2008		
Fast & Furious	Justin Lin	April 3, 2009		
Los Bandoleros	Vin Diesel	July 28, 2009	Short film	
Fast Five	Justin Lin	April 29, 2011		
Fast & Furious 6	Justin Lin	May 24, 2013		
Riddick	David Twohy	September 6, 2013		
Furious 7	James Wan	April 3, 2015		
The Last Witch Hunter	Breck Eisner	October 23, 2015		
XXX: Return of Xander Cage	D.J. Caruso	January 20, 2017		
The Fate of the Furious	F. Gary Gray	April 14, 2017		
Bloodshot	David S. F. Wilson	March 13, 2020		
F9	Justin Lin	June 25, 2021		
Fast X	Louis Leterrier	May 19, 2023		
Fast Forever	Louis Leterrier	March 17, 2028		

=== Undated films ===
Title	Release date	Notes	Ref.
Fast Forever	March 17, 2028	distributed by Universal Pictures; co-production with Original Film, Perfect Storm Entertainment, Seven Bucks Productions, and Roth/Kirschenbaum Films	
Fast & Furious Presents: Hobbs & Reyes	TBA	distributed by Universal Pictures; co-production with Original Film, FlynnPictureCo., Seven Bucks Productions, Chris Morgan Productions, and Roth/Kirschenbaum Films	
Rock 'Em Sock 'Em Robots	TBA	distributed by Universal Pictures; co-production with Mattel Studios	
Riddick: Furya	TBA	financed by FFF Bayern, distributed internationally by Rocket Science and in the US by CAA Media and Universal Pictures	
