= Riddick (character) =

Fictional character

- The Chronicles of Riddick character
- Vin Diesel as Riddick
- First appearance: Pitch Black (2000)
- Created by: David Twohy; Jim Wheat; Ken Wheat
- Portrayed by: Vin Diesel
- Voiced by: Vin Diesel

In-universe information
- Nickname: Riddick
- Species: Furyan
- Gender: Male
- Occupation: Fugitive; Former Lord Marshall
- Family: None surviving
- Nationality: Furya

Richard B. Riddick, commonly known as Riddick, is a fictional character and the protagonist of the Chronicles of Riddick series. This series includes the animated short film Dark Fury and the video games Escape from Butcher Bay and Assault on Dark Athena. Actor Vin Diesel has portrayed Riddick in all film and video game adaptations.

Within the series, Riddick is depicted as having a wide range of skills, including exceptional mobility, stealth, combat abilities, survival in harsh conditions, prison escape, and piloting. Despite his criminal background, he occasionally performs moral or heroic actions, often against his own survivalist instincts.

Originally shown as a human in Pitch Black, Riddick's species is later revealed to be Furyan in subsequent sequels. The Furyans are a warrior species nearly exterminated by a military campaign that left their home planet, Furya, desolate. Riddick is one of the last surviving members of this species. His eyes, a defining feature, allow him to see clearly in the dark, a trait associated with a specific caste of Furyans known as Alpha-Furyans. In Pitch Black, he implies that his eyes were surgically altered, but this is later attributed to his Furyan heritage. To protect his eyes from bright light, he wears tinted welding goggles.

Riddick's past includes a role as a member of a security force, eventually becoming a soldier. This background contributes to his complex character, blending elements of an antihero with occasional heroic actions.

== Biography ==
=== Early life ===
Riddick was born on the planet Furya. Before his birth, a Necromonger officer named Zhylaw who would later become the Lord Marshal, consulted an Elemental seer. The seer foretold that a Furyan male would be born who would ultimately lead to Zhylaw's downfall. In response, Zhylaw launched an attack on Furya, attempting to massacre all male infants, even personally strangling newborns with their umbilical cords. Riddick was among those targeted but managed to survive the ordeal.

In his later life, Riddick repressed memories of the massacre on Furya. He believed that his mother had attempted to strangle him at birth and abandoned him in a trash bin behind a liquor store. Despite these repressed memories, he periodically received visions and messages from Shirah, a surviving Furyan.

=== Pitch Black ===
In the premiere installment of the Chronicles of Riddick franchise, Riddick is introduced as a notorious convict being transported to a penal institution by a bounty hunter named William J. Johns. Johns, posing as a police officer, travels with a group of settlers aboard the transport ship Hunter Gratzner. His objective is to safely deliver Riddick to a prison colony and claim the substantial bounty on him.

During the journey, the ship passes through the tail of a comet while on autopilot, causing it to crash land on an unknown planet with three suns. The survivors soon find themselves battling for their lives against a predatory species known as Bio-Raptors. By the end of the film, only three survivors remain: Riddick, a young girl named Jack, and a man named Imam.

=== Dark Fury ===
Shortly after escaping the planet from Pitch Black, Riddick, Jack, and Imam are picked up by a mercenary spacecraft. Riddick tries to hide his identity from the mercenaries by impersonating William J. Johns over the intercom. However, the mercenaries quickly identify him through voiceprint recognition.

Captured by the mercenaries, the trio learns that their captors have unusual plans for Riddick. The ship's owner, Antonia Chillingsworth, collects notorious criminals, freezing them and displaying them as statues, which she considers art. Although frozen, the criminals remain alive and conscious. Chillingsworth views Riddick as the ultimate "masterpiece" for her collection.

Riddick, Jack, and Imam must fight their way through Chillingsworth's army of human and alien creatures to avoid a fate worse than death. After overcoming most of the mercenaries on the ship, the trio takes one of Antonia's shuttles and heads for New Mecca. At one point, the navigation system suggests a possible course for Furya, but Riddick ultimately leaves Jack and Imam at New Mecca before departing for the planet UV 6.

=== The Chronicles of Riddick ===
Five years later, Riddick remains in hiding on an Arctic planet known as UV 6, characterized by its harsh ultraviolet light. During this time, Imam learns that his home planet, Helion Prime, is threatened by an impending invasion from the Necromongers, a fanatical religious crusade. Remembering Riddick's story about his Furyan origins, Imam reveals Riddick's location to the leaders of Helion Prime.

Initially, Riddick is reluctant to become involved in the conflict between the Necromongers and the worlds they seek to conquer. However, after Imam is killed, Riddick embarks on a mission to avenge him. With the assistance of Jack (who has abandoned that name in favor of Kyra while in prison), Riddick ultimately overthrows the Necromonger leader, the Lord Marshal, and assumes his position as the new leader of the Necromongers.

=== Riddick ===
Dissatisfied with his role as Lord Marshal, Riddick sets out to find Furya, but instead, he is abandoned on a desolate planet. Stranded, he discovers that a deadly storm is approaching, which will provide cover for numerous predators. To escape, Riddick uses the communication system from a mercenary outpost to lure two ships to the planet, intending to commandeer one. However, his plan becomes complicated when one of the arriving mercenaries turns out to be the father of William J. Johns, his old adversary.

As the storm nears, Riddick forces the mercenaries to cooperate with him to survive. Despite their initial hostility, Riddick is eventually surrounded by enemies and nearly killed. Unexpectedly, the elder Johns rescues him and allows him to leave the planet. Before departing, Riddick acknowledges that Johns is a better man than his son.

== Powers and abilities ==
=== Eyeshine ===
In Pitch Black, Riddick says that while imprisoned in Butcher Bay, he received eye surgery—referred to as a "surgical shine job"—from a doctor who granted him permanent night vision in exchange for "20 menthol KOOLs" cigarettes. This procedure made his eyes highly sensitive to normal light, necessitating the use of welding goggles for protection, although he is occasionally seen without them in normally lit environments.

In the flash movie on the Pitchblack.com website, Riddick undergoes the eye-shine surgery to gain an advantage after encountering humanoids called "shiners," who also possess enhanced night vision. These "shiners" call Riddick "darkeye" and have had similar surgeries to navigate the dark areas of the Ursa Luna prison, where guards rarely venture. The surgery is depicted as being performed by a bovine veterinarian in a prison facility where Riddick has just arrived and is already planning his escape. Riddick chooses to forgo anesthesia for the painful procedure, which involves cutting the cornea and drilling into the eye to inject a reflective substance behind the retina. The quoted cost is 1000 credits, but having no cash, Riddick offers a pack of KOOL cigarettes as a down payment and takes welding goggles from the facility.

The video game The Chronicles of Riddick: Escape from Butcher Bay, a prequel to Pitch Black, provides additional context. In the game, after helping a character named "Pope Joe" retrieve his "blessed voice box," Riddick receives stitches for an injury. Pope Joe advises Riddick on how to escape and warns him not to "trust [his] eyes." At that moment, a ghostly voice informs Riddick that he has "been blind for far too long" and grants him a "gift." This voice belongs to a character named "Shirah," who serves as a spiritual guide, helping Riddick awaken his dormant Furyan abilities. This moment marks the acquisition of his eyeshine.

In the Chronicles of Riddick film, Jack/Kyra confronts Riddick, revealing that during her imprisonment, she discovered that no one could perform a "surgical shine job" for any price, accusing Riddick of lying about how he gained his night vision.

A real-life procedure somewhat similar to Riddick's fictional eyeshine, involving light amplification, has been patented.

=== Wrath of the Furyans ===
In addition to aiding Riddick in unlocking his eyeshine, the character Shirah helps him discover his ability to unleash a powerful energy wave. This ability is depicted in the director's cut of The Chronicles of Riddick. During a pivotal scene, Shirah places her hand on Riddick's chest, leaving a glowing blue handprint, and states, "this mark carries the anger of an entire race... but it's going to hurt." Subsequently, either immediately after being struck by Vaako's energy handgun or just before the weapon discharges, Riddick releases a large blast of blue energy. This blast emanates from Riddick, seemingly guided by Shirah, and kills the surrounding Necromongers.

This formidable energy wave ability is also referenced off-screen in the video game Escape from Butcher Bay. Shirah's interventions highlight Riddick's latent Furyan powers, which are pivotal in his battles against the Necromongers and other adversaries.

== Other appearances ==
Riddick made his first appearance outside of the film Pitch Black in the gaming world as a guest character in Fallout Tactics. In this game, he appears in a special encounter titled Pitch Black reflecting his movie origin. Like his cinematic counterpart, Riddick is portrayed as a stealth-focused melee fighter with advanced hand-to-hand combat skills and the ability to see in the dark.

Additionally, Riddick has been featured as a playable character in the Xbox game Deathrow. As a member of the Convicts team, he possesses the highest levels of strength and aggression among recruitable players. However, he also has one of the lowest teamplay ratings in the game.

A parody version of the Riddick character has been the protagonist in the TimeSplitters video game franchise.

Richard B. Riddick first made his debut in the Shockwave prequel comic Pitch Black: Slam City, which was released on the official Pitch Black website a month before the movie premiered. Since then, the character has been consistently portrayed by actor Vin Diesel in all subsequent appearances across various media platforms.

In Jim and Ken Wheat's original script for Pitch Black, the Riddick character was a woman named Taras Krieg.
