= Tigon (disambiguation) =

A tigon is a hybrid cross between a female lion and a male tiger.

Tigon may also refer to:

- Tigon British Film Productions, a British film production and distribution company
- Tigon Studios, a video game production company
