= The Chronicles of Riddick: Escape from Butcher Bay =

2004 video game

- North American cover art
- Developers: Starbreeze Studios; Tigon Studios
- Publisher: Vivendi Universal Games (Note: Released under the Sierra Entertainment brand name in PAL regions)
- Producer: Lars Johansson
- Designers: Fredrik Ljungdahl; Jens Andersson
- Programmers: Magnus Högdahl; Jens Andersson
- Artist: Jens Matthies
- Writers: Mikael Säker; John Zuur Platten; Flint Dille
- Composer: Gustaf Grefberg
- Series: The Chronicles of Riddick
- Platforms: Xbox; Microsoft Windows
- Release: Xbox: NA: June 1, 2004; EU: August 13, 2004; Windows: EU: December 3, 2004; NA: December 8, 2004
- Genres: First-person shooter, stealth
- Mode: Single-player

The Chronicles of Riddick: Escape from Butcher Bay is a first-person shooter and stealth video game developed by Starbreeze Studios and Tigon Studios and published by Vivendi Universal Games. Released for the Xbox and Microsoft Windows in 2004, the game's story is a prequel to the futuristic science fiction film Pitch Black. Actor Vin Diesel—who was involved in the game's development—reprises his role as that film's protagonist, Richard B. Riddick.

The game follows Riddick, the anti-hero of the two films Pitch Black and The Chronicles of Riddick, as he attempts to escape from a maximum-security prison called Butcher Bay. Escape from Butcher Bay's designers focused on exploring Riddick's character in a prison break setting to differentiate the game from the film. The game's influences include the film Escape from Alcatraz, and video games such as Half-Life, Thief: The Dark Project, and Tom Clancy's Splinter Cell.

Escape from Butcher Bay received acclaim by critics, who lauded its graphics and its implementation of stealth, action and adventure elements. Some critics consider the game superior to the film, a rarity among film tie-in games. However, they commonly lamented its brevity and lack of multiplayer components. The game is cited as one of the greatest video games ever made. It went on to win several accolades, including the Golden Joystick Award for Unsung Hero Game of the Year and the Spike Video Game Award for Best Game Based on a Movie. In 2009, the game was included in The Chronicles of Riddick: Assault on Dark Athena, with enhanced visuals.

== Gameplay ==
Riddick in stealth mode, preparing to stab an enemy with a screwdriver

In Escape from Butcher Bay, the player takes control of protagonist Richard B. Riddick as he attempts to break out of Butcher Bay prison. The game incorporates various elements from video game genres such as first-person shooter, adventure and stealth, and is played primarily from a first-person perspective, though the camera switches to a third-person perspective during certain scenes. Unlike many first-person shooters, the game contains no head-up display; on-screen cues are limited to flashes when a new weapon is selected, and small, white boxes that display the player character's health when damage is taken. Health can be replenished in designated areas throughout the game. By finding cigarette packs hidden in levels, the player can unlock concept art and video files.

The player may interact with and receive quests from the prison's residents, and earns information, tools and other rewards by completing quests. Violent conflict often occurs between the player, inmates and prison guards. The player attacks with Riddick's bare hands, or with improvised weapons such as shivs and clubs. Combos are created by stringing together punches. A DNA-scanning security system initially prevents Riddick from using firearms, but a limited arsenal later becomes available.

A "stealth mode" is activated when the player character crouches, allowing the player to move silently and tinting the edges of the screen blue when the player is hidden. While in stealth mode, the player can drag bodies out of sight and hide from enemies. The mode grants attacks that quickly kill enemies; the player may drop on enemies from above, or execute them from behind. During the game, Riddick acquires eyeshine, allowing him to see in the dark but temporarily blinding him if used in brightly lit areas.

== Plot ==
=== Setting and characters ===
Escape from Butcher Bay is set in the futuristic science fiction universe of the Chronicles of Riddick franchise, and is a prequel to the film Pitch Black. The game takes place inside Butcher Bay, a maximum-security prison from which no prisoner has escaped. The facility—constructed on a barren planet—contains three increasingly secure holding areas, and a subterranean mining operation.

The game's protagonist is Richard B. Riddick (reprised by Vin Diesel), a murderer recently confined in Butcher Bay. Riddick is resourceful, and seeks to break out of the prison by any means necessary. His capturer is the bounty hunter William J. Johns (reprised by Cole Hauser); the two have had previous encounters. Butcher Bay's warden is a man named Hoxie (Dwight Schultz), while Abbott (Xzibit) is a prison guard disliked by the inmates. The inmate Pope Joe (Willis Burks II) is an insane old man, who lives in the sewer tunnels beneath the prison.

=== Story ===
The opening cinematic shows Riddick in hiding, having grown out his hair and beard, before the opening scene of the Chronicles of Riddick movie. He hunts an animal and after killing it, a disembodied voice starts talking to him asking him where he got his eyes. He states that he received them from a "slam preacher" and this causes him to remember his time at Butcher Bay. The game takes place in a flashback.

Another opening cinematic takes place in which Riddick is being transported for collection on the bounty. He and Johns have a brief conversation in which Riddick tells Johns that there is no way he is going to get the price he wants. Riddick wakes up as they land and stands out front of Butcher Bay waiting for the warden. He sneaks up behind Johns and breaks his neck and proceeds to escape. After getting his hands on a gun, he goes through the ventilation ducts and seemingly escapes into the desert. Everything fades to white as Riddick hears Johns saying, "Rise and shine, Riddick." It turns out this escape was simply a dream.

Riddick wakes up and Johns escorts him off the ship. Johns meets with Hoxie to negotiate his pay, while Abbott escorts Riddick to his cell in the "single-max" security area. After making enemies with and killing a gang leader named Rust (Steve Blum), Riddick familiarizes himself with the facility, and soon instigates a riot; during the confusion, he escapes into the prison's sewer system. Armed with a shotgun and a dying flashlight, Riddick discovers he is not alone in the sewers. Fighting through the sewers against mutant "dwellers", Riddick eventually meets Pope Joe, for whom he retrieves a lost radio, which Joe calls a blessed voicebox. A woman named Shirah (Kristin Lehman) tells Riddick that he "has been blind too long", and he gains his trademark "eyeshine" night vision. Afterwards, he accuses Pope Joe of tampering with his eyes; Joe says that he merely treated Riddick's injured arm. Riddick then continues his escape, while using the eyeshine to his advantage.

After emerging from a manhole in the showers of the guard living quarters, Riddick uses a guard uniform to blend in as he makes his way to the space port and his chance at escape. Realizing he requires a guard to get through the retinal scanner that locks the doors to the space port, Riddick decides to go after Abbott and take his eyes. He gains access to Abbott's apartment by telling him there is a delivery for him. A fire fight ensues and after that, as Abbott bleeds out on the floor, Riddick moves in for the kill but is stopped by Johns.

Riddick is captured and transferred to the "double-max" security area. Gaining the trust of the inmates by participating in fighting matches, Riddick eventually kills the champion of the fighting matches, a guard named Bam. This leads him to be taken to a room where no surveillance is seen and several guards await to kill Riddick. Abbott walks into the room, fully healed, holding a baseball bat. Shirah returns to him and tells him that the fury of all of his kind is within him, and he can release it if he chooses. Riddick lets out a loud scream as a blast of energy called the 'Rage of Furya' kills all the guards around him except Abbott, who hides and then panics and attacks Riddick. Riddick kills Abbott, steals his keycard, and proceeds to find another way to escape. Using a secret entrance to an elevator, he infiltrates a mining facility. He meets an inmate of great influence in the area named Jagger Valance (Ron Perlman), who wishes to escape with him. He makes a bomb and plants it in a mining site with a massive gas leak. However, Riddick is discovered and caught by the guards. During his transfer to another section, the prison is disrupted by an outbreak of creatures called "Xeno", due to the bomb Riddick planted, in order to create the confusion necessary for his escape, and Riddick attempts to escape with Valance. His plans are foiled again by Johns. After a fist fight, Riddick and Johns are both shot by Valance (who only meant to hit Johns) and Valance is killed by the guards. After meeting again with the warden, and telling him that he is just getting started, Riddick is placed in the "triple-max" area, where inmates are kept in cryonic sleep. They are awakened daily for two minutes of exercise; during this time, Riddick discovers a flaw in the system and escapes. He then hijacks a large robot and fights his way through Butcher Bay to reach Hoxie.

Tired of dealing with the prison officials, Johns helps Riddick to elude the guards. Riddick knocks Johns out and flies the ship into the warden's office. The warden calls in two robot guards with cloaking abilities and Riddick defeats them. After Hoxie surrenders, Riddick receives the codes to Hoxie's ship and Riddick and Johns escape disguised as a guard and prisoner. Two guards enter Hoxie's room, where Hoxie is bound and covered in Riddick's former attire with a gun tied to him and aimed at the door. The guards mistake Hoxie for Riddick and kill him. Riddick and Johns take off in Hoxie's ship, ending the game.

In a closing cinematic, after recalling the events at Butcher Bay, Riddick is shown visions of the events to come in the Chronicles of Riddick and prepares himself.

== Development ==
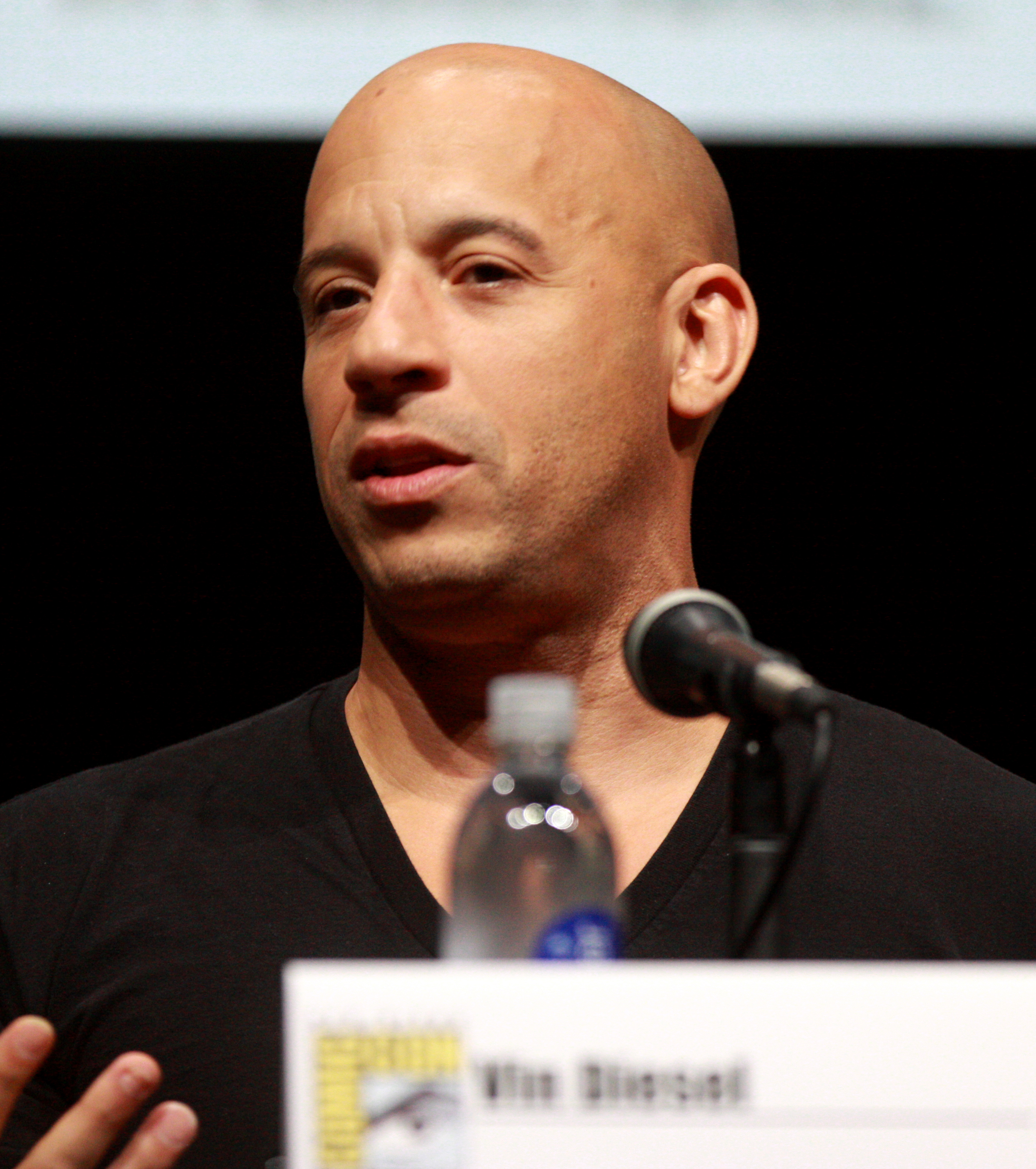
Actor Vin Diesel reprised his role as Riddick for Escape from Butcher Bay, and assisted in the game's development.

Escape from Butcher Bay was co-developed by Swedish company Starbreeze Studios and the Vin Diesel-founded Tigon Studios, and published by Vivendi Games and Tigon Studios. Universal Studios Consumer Products Group granted The Chronicles of Riddick license to Universal Interactive; both companies were owned by Vivendi Universal. The game was announced in March 2004 as an Xbox title. Tigon Studios' Cos Lazouras said, "[The game] features an original storyline that provides insight into how Riddick evolved into such a complex character".

In contrast to other film tie-in games, which often closely follow the events of their source material, the development team of Escape from Butcher Bay focused on differentiating the game from The Chronicles of Riddick. They sought to explore Riddick's character in a prison break setting, and took inspiration from films such as Escape from Alcatraz. Starbreeze was also inspired by video games such as GoldenEye 007 and the Tom Clancy's Splinter Cell series. The opening sequence, in which Riddick is escorted into Butcher Bay, is a tribute to Half-Life, the game's hand-to-hand combat was inspired by Punch-Out!!, and the stealth mechanics, such as hiding in the shadows and leaning, were inspired by that of Thief: The Dark Project and Deus Ex. Starbreeze focused solely on developing the game's single-player mode, and did not include multiplayer; the company believed that such a mode would require a design team twice as large and another year of development.

Vin Diesel, the lead actor of The Chronicles of Riddick, provided his voice and likeness for Riddick. He and director David Twohy also contributed to the game's plot and character design; the game's story was developed in conjunction with the film's. Per the filmmakers' instructions, the designers made the origin of Riddick's "eyeshine" vague. Diesel offered guidance to the game's lead writer during voice recording sessions; this included dialogue rewrites to reduce Riddick's lines, as Diesel believed the character spoke too often.

Starbreeze intended for Escape from Butcher Bay to feature more complex role-playing game systems, but feedback from Diesel and game testers dissuaded them. Starbreeze senior producer Peter Wanat said, "We tried to limit the number of really hard or really intricate RPG elements, and that was a choice because we wanted the game to be playable." Other removed features include an electric bullwhip for the guard Abbott, and a 25-minute final boss fight. A PlayStation 2 version that was in development was cancelled so the company could focus on the Xbox version.

The game uses normal mapping, which allows detailed textures to be drawn on models with lower polygon counts; this increases visual fidelity, without sacrificing higher frame rates. It also featured dynamic lighting with per-pixel stencil shadowing and self-shadowing.

Escape from Butcher Bay was completed in 18 months. Vin Diesel promoted the game and the accompanying movie at the May 2004 Electronic Entertainment Expo (E3) video game convention. The game was released in North America on June 1, 2004, shortly before The Chronicles of Riddick. North American pre-orders of the game included a DVD of promotional content, such as a partial interactive walkthrough and footage from the film. The game's soundtrack, composed by Gustaf Grefberg, was released by Vivendi as a free download on June 24, 2004.

Following rumors, Vivendi confirmed in July 2004 that a Windows port of Escape from Butcher Bay was in development, entitled "The Chronicles of Riddick: Escape from Butcher Bay Director's Cut". The game features a higher display resolution, additional cigarette packs, and new scenes where Riddick steals mechanized riot armor. It includes developer commentary which details the game's creation and design decisions. The game was released on December 8 in North America.

=== Expanded remake ===
"We're very happy to be working in the Riddick universe again. Assault on Dark Athena gives us an opportunity to revisit the original game and share it with a new audience, as well as offer a continuation of the Butcher Bay gameplay and storyline."

— Ian Stevens, Starbreeze Studios

In May 2007, Vivendi announced that Escape from Butcher Bay was being remade by Starbreeze Studios for PC, Xbox 360 and PlayStation 3. Entitled The Chronicles of Riddick: Assault on Dark Athena, the game was referred to by Vivendi as a "reinvention" of Escape from Butcher Bay; it would include a multiplayer mode and new single-player content. It was planned that Vivendi-subsidiary Sierra Entertainment would publish the game in late 2007.

In December 2007, Activision and Vivendi Games merged to become Activision Blizzard; the new company announced the dismissal of Assault on Dark Athena, Brütal Legend, Ghostbusters: The Video Game and others from its roster in July 2008. The titles were put up for sale to other publishers. In September 2008, Starbreeze Studios confirmed that the game was still in development, and that it was nearing completion. The following month, Atari reportedly paid a flat fee for the publishing rights to Assault on Dark Athena and Ghostbusters: The Video Game; Atari later confirmed that it had picked up both titles. The company also stated that it had struck a deal with Universal Studios to develop more Chronicles of Riddick games. Assault on Dark Athena was released in April 2009 in North America, Europe, and Australia.

== Reception ==
Reception

Aggregate scores
| Aggregator | Score | |
| Aggregator | PC | Xbox |
|---|---|---|
| GameRankings | 90.95% | 88.72% |
| Metacritic | 90/100 | 89/100 |

Review scores
| Publication | Score | |
| Publication | PC | Xbox |
|---|---|---|
| 1Up.com | A+ | A |
| Computer and Video Games | 8.6/10 | 8.3/10 |
| Edge | | 7/10 |
| Eurogamer | 9/10 | 9/10 |
| Game Informer | | 9.5/10 |
| GameSpot | 9.3/10 | 9.3/10 |
| GameSpy | 4.5/5 | 4.5/5 |
| GamesRadar+ | 8/10 | |
| GameZone | 9.2/10 | 9.2/10 |
| IGN | 8.8/10 | 8.5/10 |
| Maximum PC | 9/10 | |
| PC Gamer (US) | 9.3/10 | |

Escape from Butcher Bay received critical acclaim. Certain reviewers preferred the game over its film counterpart, and considered it an exception to the general mediocrity of film tie-in games.

Escape from Butcher Bay's gameplay was compared to first-person shooters like Far Cry and Half-Life, and to stealth game series like Splinter Cell, Metal Gear, and Thief. Reviewers enjoyed the variety of gameplay elements: Game Informer's Jeremy Zoss noted that "every aspect of play is expertly implemented", and GameSpot's Greg Kasavin believed that the game "effectively and innovatively combines excellent shooting, hand-to-hand combat, stealth, and adventure elements". While the game's stealth mechanics were praised, certain critics received its first-person shooter elements with less enthusiasm. Reviewers applauded the control scheme, such as the Xbox version's analog stick-based hand-to-hand combat. The implementation of Riddick's eyeshine ability was also generally praised, but Computer and Video Games believed that it was no different from night vision goggles in other first-person shooters, and said that it "could've been developed into so much more."

The game's visuals—particularly the Xbox version's—were acclaimed, and compared to those of Doom 3 and Half-Life 2. GameZone's Michael Lafferty said that the game's graphics "[take] the genre to the next level". The textures and lighting were cited as high points, particularly because of the gameplay role of shadows. Character models and facial animations were considered highly realistic; much praise was given to those of Riddick. GameSpot appreciated the developers' attention to detail; they noted that recent bullet-holes glow red and smoke, but gradually cool and darken. Certain reviewers complained about graphical glitches, such as "seams" and "clipping", and gave as an example the visibility of bullet tracers through walls. The portrayal of Butcher Bay was considered convincing, and 1UP's Shawn Elliott compared it to the settings of the Alien franchise.

"You can almost smell the thick stink of Butcher Bay and its inhabitants from the grime on the walls, dirty clothes of the inmates, and environmental textures. This place oozes with style and creates sense of reality in which it's easy to become immersed."

— Perry and Adams, IGN

The audio of Escape from Butcher Bay was generally well received, and critics praised its voice acting; the performances of Vin Diesel and Cole Hauser were given special commendation. In regard to the music, FiringSquad's Jakub Wojnarowicz stated, "It's not good enough to sweep you away[,] but it's also not bad enough to stick out like a sore thumb". IGN said, "The music isn't memorable, but it's not bad". The Sunday Herald Sun called the voice acting "Surprisingly good". The game's length was commonly criticized. Reviewers noted that it could be completed in eight to fifteen hours, and IGN said, "If you consider around 12 hours of gameplay short, then Riddick is just that." Several reviewers were displeased by the game's lack of multiplayer components; Computer and Video Games referred to it as a "missed opportunity". Game Informer said, "Since the main quest is short [...] and there is no multiplayer, it's not a ton of game for your money."

Professor James Paul Gee, a researcher of video games, has used Escape from Butcher Bay in his studies. He discussed the relation of Garrett from Thief and the nameless soldier from Full Spectrum Warrior with the character of Riddick, saying that the games "allow players to take a projective stance to the (virtual) world, but a stance that is rooted in the knowledge, values, and ways of seeing and being in the world of an authentic professional, an 'expert'."

=== Sales ===
The Xbox version of the game had sold 159,000 units by August 2004, and was among the best-selling games on any platform during June 2004; it was later re-released as a Platinum Hits title. Conversely, the PC version sold 32,500 after six months on shelves.

In a December 2008 interview, Ian Stevens (Head of Tigon Studios) said that sales were lackluster because consumers were not "big on Vin Diesel" and "highly skeptical of a film property translating well as a video game".

=== Awards and accolades ===
Both versions of the game were given editor's choice awards from IGN, GameSpot, and GameSpy. GameSpot named it the best Xbox game of June 2004, and the PC version was IGN's PC Game of the Month for December 2004. It later won GameSpot's annual "Most Surprisingly Good Game" and "Best Game Based on a TV or Film Property" awards, and was a runner-up in the publication's "Best Action Adventure Game", "Best Original Music", "Best Sound Effects", "Best Story", "Best Graphics, Technical", "Best Voice Acting" and "Most Innovative Game" categories, as well as for „Game of the Year”. The editors of Computer Gaming World presented Butcher Bay with their 2004 "Action Game of the Year" award, and hailed it as "the best movie prequel ever produced". Computer Games Magazine named Escape from Butcher Bay the tenth-best computer game of 2004.

IGN later ranked Butcher Bay 12th on its list of the 25 greatest Xbox games of all time. Game Informer placed Escape from Butcher Bay as the 8th best on their list of 25 greatest Xbox games of all time. Escape from Butcher Bay was nominated for GameSpot's Game of the Year award for 2004, but it lost to World of Warcraft. Computer and Video Games called the PC version the 98th best PC game of all time. Billboard's Digital Entertainment Conference nominated Riddick as its Best Character in a Game and a Golden Joystick Award for "Unsung Hero Game of the Year". GamesRadar placed Escape from Butcher Bay in their "Top 7 movie games that don't suck" list, and said that "Escape from Butcher Bay was a triumph on almost every level." In 2013, IGN ranked Escape from Butcher Bay as the 27th greatest first-person shooter of all time.

| Year | Award | Category | Result | Ref. |
|---|---|---|---|---|
| 2004 | Golden Joystick Awards | Unsung Hero Game of the Year (Editors' Award) | Won | |
| 2004 | Spike TV's Video Game Awards | Best Game Based on a Movie | Won | |
| 2004 | Spike TV's Video Game Awards | Best Performance by a Human Male (Vin Diesel as Richard B. Riddick) | Nominated | |
| 2005 | 8th Annual Interactive Achievement Awards | Console First-Person Action Game of the Year | Nominated | |
| 2005 | 8th Annual Interactive Achievement Awards | Outstanding Character Performance - Male (Vin Diesel as Riddick) | Nominated | |
| 2005 | 2nd British Academy Video Games Awards | Action Game | Nominated | |
| 2005 | 2nd British Academy Video Games Awards | Xbox | Nominated | |
