= Wheelman (video game) =

2009 video game

- Developers: Tigon Studios; Midway Studios – Newcastle
- Publishers: NA: Ubisoft; PAL: Midway Games
- Producers: Joe Neate; Jemma Harris
- Writers: Flint Dille; John Zuur Platten
- Composers: Jorge & Guillermo Badolato
- Engine: Unreal Engine 3
- Platforms: Microsoft Windows, PlayStation 3, Xbox 360
- Release: NA: March 24, 2009; AU: March 26, 2009; EU: March 27, 2009
- Genre: Action-adventure
- Mode: Single-player

Wheelman is an action-adventure video game developed by Tigon Studios and Midway Studios – Newcastle and published by Ubisoft in conjunction with Midway Games for the PlayStation 3, Xbox 360 and Microsoft Windows. The game was released in March 2009 and stars Vin Diesel.

== Gameplay ==
The game is set in an open world environment modeled after Barcelona, full of destructible objects, alleyways, shortcuts through office blocks and a total of 31 story missions and 105 side missions. While most missions are driving-oriented, there are also foot missions which are played from a third person perspective. A wide variety of weapons are available to the player, such as pistols, assault rifles and RPGs. The game features a unique element called "Airjack", where players are able to hijack an enemy or civilian vehicle by locking on and jumping in from the one they are driving.

Among the vehicles used by Milo Burik in the game is the Pontiac G8 and the Opel Astra. In the demo, the license plate says MRTL KM8T which is a reference to Mortal Kombat, Midway's popular fighting game.

== Plot ==
Milo Burik, an undercover agent for the CIA, is assigned to the investigate a briefcase containing classified documents, which the various criminal factions of Barcelona plan on stealing and selling to the highest bidder. Milo is then placed under the supervision of Anton Gallo, the assistant bureau chief, and makes his presence within the city known by acting as a getaway driver for Lumi Vega, an independent thief who is supposedly assembling a team for a potential heist. Afterwards, Milo infiltrates the Chulos Canallas, where Milo befriends Miguel Delgado, the enforcer and brother of the gang's leader, Stavo. After retrieving some stolen vehicles, Milo confronts Felipe Lial, the nephew of Paulo Lial, the head of Los Lantos, the most powerful criminal organization in the city. Because of Felipe's opportunist nature and dissatisfaction with Los Lantos, Milo discovers that he has been in touch with the different criminal factions and revealing private information about each of them. Following this, Milo intimidates Felipe into providing a meeting with Paulo, who becomes impressed with the former's courage and driving skills before ordering him to escort Felipe to a deal with other gangsters in the city; Milo interrogates Felipe regarding the different criminal factions. Afterwards, the deal goes wrong and Felipe betrays Milo before escaping with Lumi, who has selected the former to be her wheelman for the unknown heist, alongside Javier Ramos, her computer scientist and known associate.

Following this, Milo approaches Adrian McGann, who provides him with information, and learns that Micca the Morro, an associate of Felipe, is attempting to become independent. Afterwards, Milo captures Micca and interrogates him for the location of Felipe, though he is unsure of the latter's current whereabouts and reveals that he was working with each of the criminal factions. Simultaneously, Adrian advises Milo to approach Sorin Teodor, the enforcer of a Romanian gang led by Radu Negrea. However, Sorin is unsure of Felipe's whereabouts, though he agrees to work with Milo after he completes a favor for him. Afterwards, Milo works with Canallas lieutenant Che Taraval to rescue Miguel from the Romanians, impressing Stavo. Milo is hired to participate as a wheelman and bodyguard for a heist against the Romanians, in which they kill several gangsters and steal a truck containing weapons, which leads to both factions exploring the possibility of war with one another. Following this, Milo returns to Sorin who asks Milo to deliver a peace offering to the Canallas. However, Milo discovers that Miguel has been beaten and wired to a bomb, and has also been ditched inside a damaged vehicle that is wanted by the police. After avoiding the police, Milo delivers Miguel to the Canallas and they successfully defuse the bomb, earning Stavo's gratitude. Afterwards, Milo returns to Los Lantos and is tasked with kidnapping a rogue information broker before delivering him to Paulo's henchmen, who take him to his own mansion to be sold to the highest bidder. However, the police raid the mansion and arrest Paulo's men before taking the broker away, though Milo intercepts and steals the broker's tracking device before rescuing Paulo's men.

Eventually, Milo is brought back by Sorin to meet Radu, who offers him another chance to prove his loyalty by destroying the newspaper advertisements and the office building of the newspaper company that is partnered with the Canallas in retaliation for the heist. Soon after, all three factions track down the documents to the La Monumental bullring and engage in a gunfight in an attempt to retrieve them; Milo arrives and guns down several gangsters, though the Romanians' reinforcements arrive and steal the documents. Following a brief pursuit, Milo kills Sorin, allowing Che to retrieve the documents before fleeing to the subway station and stealing one of the trains. However, Milo pursues and shoots Che, who is killed in the ensuing crash whilst the former retrieves the documents. Afterwards, Milo tracks down Felipe and pursues him to the Barcelona Cathedral, where Lumi dismisses his concerns over Felipe's true loyalties. Later, Felipe demands that Milo meet with him, though he ambushes him with the other Romanians. Felipe is killed in the ensuing gunfight, and Milo discovers a dagger with Romanian engraving on it, which he uses to prove the Felipe's deception to Lumi and Javier. Simultaneously, Milo works for each faction in upsetting the balance of power by massacring, ultimately exposing his undercover status in the process, and depending on which faction was attacked the worst, Milo is forced to eliminate either Paulo, Stavo or Radu in the midst of the gang war. Afterwards, Lumi and Javier are cornered by one of the surviving gangs in the cathedral, leading to a gunfight that results in the death of the leader of the gang and the destruction of the cathedral. Milo, Lumi and Javier escape and use the documents to track down the briefcase, which they successfully steal from the buyer. Unfortunately, the briefcase is stolen by the remaining faction, forcing them to kill the surviving leader and retrieve the briefcase, though Javier is killed in the process. Afterwards, Milo and Lumi approach Gallo, who reveals Milo's undercover status to Lumi before stealing the briefcase. Following this, Milo pursues Gallo to his yacht and drives a car over a ramp at the docks, exiting before it destroys the yacht, killing Gallo, before parting ways with Lumi and ensuring that her death is faked to keep her safe.

== Development ==
Wheelman was announced in February 2006 by publisher Midway Games as the second of three titles in a joint collaboration between Midway and MTV Networks. Midway Games collaborated with Tigon Studios to design the game. After multiple delays over the course of around three years, Wheelman was released in March 2009.

The budget for Wheelman was believed to be north of $15 million.

== Film adaptation ==
Simultaneously with the announcement of the video game in February 2006, a film adaptation was announced with Vin Diesel in the lead role and Rich Wilkes, who worked with Diesel on xXx (2002), hired to write the script. Paramount Pictures and MTV Films were announced to collaborate on the project. Production of the film, with no script written yet, was estimated to be 18 months away from February 2006. The film would be a sequel to the video game. However, the film was cancelled, after getting no updates since 2009.

== Reception ==
Reception

Aggregate score
| Aggregator | Score | | |
| Aggregator | PC | PS3 | Xbox 360 |
|---|---|---|---|
| Metacritic | 58/100 | 66/100 | 64/100 |

Review scores
| Publication | Score | | |
| Publication | PC | PS3 | Xbox 360 |
|---|---|---|---|
| Edge | N/A | N/A | 4/10 |
| Eurogamer | N/A | N/A | 5/10 |
| Game Informer | N/A | 8.5/10 | 8.5/10 |
| GamePro | N/A | 4/5 | 4/5 |
| GameRevolution | D | D | D |
| GameSpot | N/A | 6/10 | 6/10 |
| GameTrailers | N/A | 5.8/10 | N/A |
| GameZone | 6/10 | 7/10 | 5.2/10 |
| Giant Bomb | 3/5 | 3/5 | 3/5 |
| IGN | 4.8/10 | 4.8/10 | 4.8/10 |
| Official Xbox Magazine (US) | N/A | N/A | 5/10 |
| PC Gamer (US) | 67% | N/A | N/A |
| PlayStation: The Official Magazine | N/A | 3/5 | N/A |
| The Daily Telegraph | N/A | N/A | 7/10 |
| Teletext Gamecentral | N/A | N/A | 4/10 |

The game received "mixed or average reviews" on all platforms according to the review aggregation website Metacritic. Many of the reviewers criticized the game for falling short of story mode and lacking multiplayer functionality. Giant Bomb's Jeff Gerstmann said "Wheelman has some great ideas that are executed well, but a lot of the peripheral stuff is underwhelming." GamePro, however, called the PlayStation and Xbox 360 versions "a GTA-meets-Burnout romp." GameSpot said of the same console versions, "Wheelman offers plenty of movie-style thrills, although it's hamstrung by terrible on-foot gameplay." Hyper's Darren Wells commended the game for "cool and useful special driving moves [and] genuinely new locale". However, he criticised it for "meaningless vehicle handling, cheating AI, poor on-foot level design [and] bland graphics".

Tom Hoggins of The Daily Telegraph gave the Xbox 360 version a score of seven out of ten and said that it "isn't exactly the smartest video game out there. In fact, it's quite possibly the dumbest game I've played in a long while. However, it's wickedly self-aware of its own silliness and revels in it, leading to the kind of guilty pleasure that can only come with such a willful grasp of absurdity. And smashing things up, of course." 411Mania gave the PS3 version six out of ten and said, "Wheelman will probably be a decent rental, and maybe a solid pick-up during Best Buy's awesome $10 clearance sales, but it's not worth a full retail purchase." Teletext GameCentral gave the Xbox 360 version four out of ten and said, "Vin Diesel proves not to have the magic touch after all, with this technically inept Driver wannabe."

== See also ==
- List of vehicular combat games
