= The Chronicles of Riddick: Assault on Dark Athena =

2009 video game

- Developers: Starbreeze Studios; Tigon Studios
- Publisher: Atari, Inc.
- Producer: Samuel Ranta-Eskola
- Designer: Jerk Gustafsson
- Programmer: Magnus Högdahl
- Artist: Mattias Snygg
- Writers: Tommy Tordsson; Mikael Säker; John Zuur Platten; Flint Dille
- Composer: Gustaf Grefberg
- Series: The Chronicles of Riddick
- Platforms: Microsoft Windows; PlayStation 3; Xbox 360; Mac OS X
- Release: Windows, PS3, X360: NA: April 7, 2009; EU: April 24, 2009; Mac OS X: WW: April 16, 2010
- Genres: Action-adventure, stealth
- Modes: Single-player, multiplayer

The Chronicles of Riddick: Assault on Dark Athena is a science fiction first-person action video game for Microsoft Windows, PlayStation 3, Xbox 360 and Mac OS X. The game is a sequel to The Chronicles of Riddick: Escape from Butcher Bay, which was remade and included along with the Assault on Dark Athena campaign. The game was released on April 7, 2009. A demo was released on Xbox Live on March 4, 2009, with a PlayStation Network release following on March 12, 2009. Virtual Programming released the Mac OS X version on April 16, 2010, as a download through Deliver2Mac.com and other digital distribution web sites.

The game was developed by Tigon Studios and Starbreeze Studios, and published by Atari, Inc. According to Ian Stevens, Head of Production at Tigon Studios, the decision to do a remake was because Microsoft could not make the Xbox 360 backward compatible with Escape from Butcher Bay, and because they wanted to get the Escape story to a larger audience before progressing further.

Dark Athena has improved graphics and artificial intelligence (AI) from Butcher Bay along with the addition of a multiplayer mode. The single player mode has also been expanded to include Riddick escaping onto a mercenary ship called Dark Athena. Vin Diesel, the voice and likeness of the title character, was involved in the production of Assault on Dark Athena.

== Plot ==
The game picks up where Escape from Butcher Bay left off. Richard B. Riddick is a dangerous space criminal who can see in the dark. Johns, the man who originally took Riddick to the Butcher Bay prison for a bounty, helped him escape to avoid becoming a prisoner himself. On their ship together in a cryogenic sleep, they are dragged unwillingly into the Dark Athena, a gigantic mercenary vessel run by Gale Revas (Michelle Forbes) and her second in command, Spinner (Wade Williams). Riddick avoids capture as Revas and her men take Johns away. Using the same stealth tactics as he did in Butcher Bay, Riddick sneaks and hides throughout the ship seeking to escape, killing the guards and mercenaries he encounters along the way. Many of the guards are automated drones that are human bodies with implanted machine parts, controlled remotely from within the ship.

He meets with a little girl named Lynn (Bridget Shergalis) who is hiding from the guards in the air vent systems. Riddick makes his way to the prison cells and finds several people captured, including the former captain of the Dark Athena before Revas took control. There he meets Lynn's mother, Ellen Silverman (Heidi Schooler). She offers to make Riddick the tools he needs to escape through the air vents if he can get the right parts. She also asks to find Lynn because she is concerned for her safety. Another prisoner named Max Dacher (Lance Henriksen) offers his technical skills to help Riddick escape on a ship and unlock doors for him if Riddick can find him a com link. He agrees and finds the com link for Dacher and the parts for Silverman. Having again met with Lynn, Silverman keeps her word and makes him the tool he needs. Riddick moves on and is in contact with Dacher via video communication at computer terminals on the ship. Riddick frees the prisoners but most are killed, including Lynn's mother Silverman. Revas kills Dacher as he prepares the ship for their escape. Riddick finally meets Revas face to face. As they fight, he wounds her severely and she is thought to be dead. As he is preparing an escape pod to take off, Lynn is pounding on the door begging to take her with him. Revas, who is still alive as Riddick's pod takes off, fires a missile that hits the pod, causing it to crash on the planet Aguerra Prime below.

Riddick wakes up on the shore of a beach and he makes his way into an abandoned city. The planet is under siege from Revas' troops who are capturing civilians and harvesting their bodies to use for their drones. Riddick realizes his only way off the planet is to get back on the Dark Athena again. He makes his way through the city and back to the port where the Athena is docked. Spinner attacks Riddick in a robotic mech suit but is defeated. He gets back onto the Dark Athena and meets Lynn again. She tells Riddick her mother taught her how to make the drones turn on Revas' crew and attack them instead. Fighting ensues on the ship between the drones and the mercenaries. He makes his way up the ship and Riddick meets with Revas again, who is in a suit of armor with heavy weapons. He defeats her by pushing her into an elevator shaft and she falls to her death. Lynn meets up with him and they are seen going into the elevator. She asks him if Revas is coming back, and Riddick answers, "When I say goodbye, it's forever."

== Development ==
The Chronicles of Riddick: Assault on Dark Athena was originally announced by Vivendi Games on May 22, 2007, as a remake of Escape from Butcher Bay with Assault on Dark Athena serving as a "bonus chapter".

On July 10, 2008, The merger between Vivendi Games, the game's publisher and Activision had been complete and on July 29, 2008, the newly formed Activision Blizzard had announced that The Chronicles of Riddick: Assault on Dark Athena along with eight other Vivendi Games titles that were in development had been dropped, putting the future of the game into question. However, on September 24, 2008, StarBreeze Studios confirmed that The Chronicles of Riddick: Assault on Dark Athena was nearing completion and were in the process of looking for a publisher to publish the game. In October 2008, Infogrames, the parent company of Atari, Inc. and Atari Interactive, announced they had picked up the publishing rights to Riddick and Ghostbusters: The Video Game from Activision. While the fate of Riddick was up in the air, Starbreeze reportedly kept working, and generated enough content by December 2008 to make Dark Athena, for all intents and purposes, a sequel to their earlier work.

== Release ==
On release, the PC version used the Tagès copy protection system. After activating the game for a third time, Tagès would start a 30-day timer. After 30 days, it enabled another activation, back up to 3 total activations. The version available on GOG.com came without this copy protection. The GOG version of the game was removed in March 2017.

== Reception ==
Reception

Aggregate score
Aggregator	Score
Metacritic	PC: 80/100; PS3: 80/100; X360: 82/100

Review scores
Publication	Score
1Up.com	B-
Edge	8/10
Game Informer	9.5/10 (Game of the Month, May 2009)
GamePro	4.5/5 (360/PS3)
GameTrailers	8.4
IGN	7.4/10
Official Xbox Magazine (US)	9.0/10
TeamXbox	8.8/10

The game received positive reviews, citing voice acting and the use of shadows as its strongest point. GameSpot praised the game for its voice acting and stated that "You may not hear better voice acting all year: It's that good." However, the AI and multiplayer was criticized. 1UP.com criticized the game for having very poor AI, citing that the player can be spotted even if he is not directly seen by the guards. Simply firing or exposing yourself will attract the enemy, regardless of whether they can see you or not. 1UP also pointed out that enemy AI will move away from the player's fire even if the attack is from behind.

Despite the criticism of the multiplayer, Gaming-Age praised the game's "Pitch Black" mode, citing that "Pitch Black, though, is easily the best aspect about the multiplayer." Game Informer said the game was better than Escape from Butcher Bay, the first game. They also praised the voice acting, stating that "Diesel's gravelly voice will rattle your living room when gunfire and explosions calm down." Hyper's Daniel Wilks commends the game as "an effortless combination of stealth and action" but criticises it for the "HD facelift" and "the lip synching is terrible".

== See also ==
- The Chronicles of Riddick (franchise)
