= Vin Diesel =

American actor (born 1967)

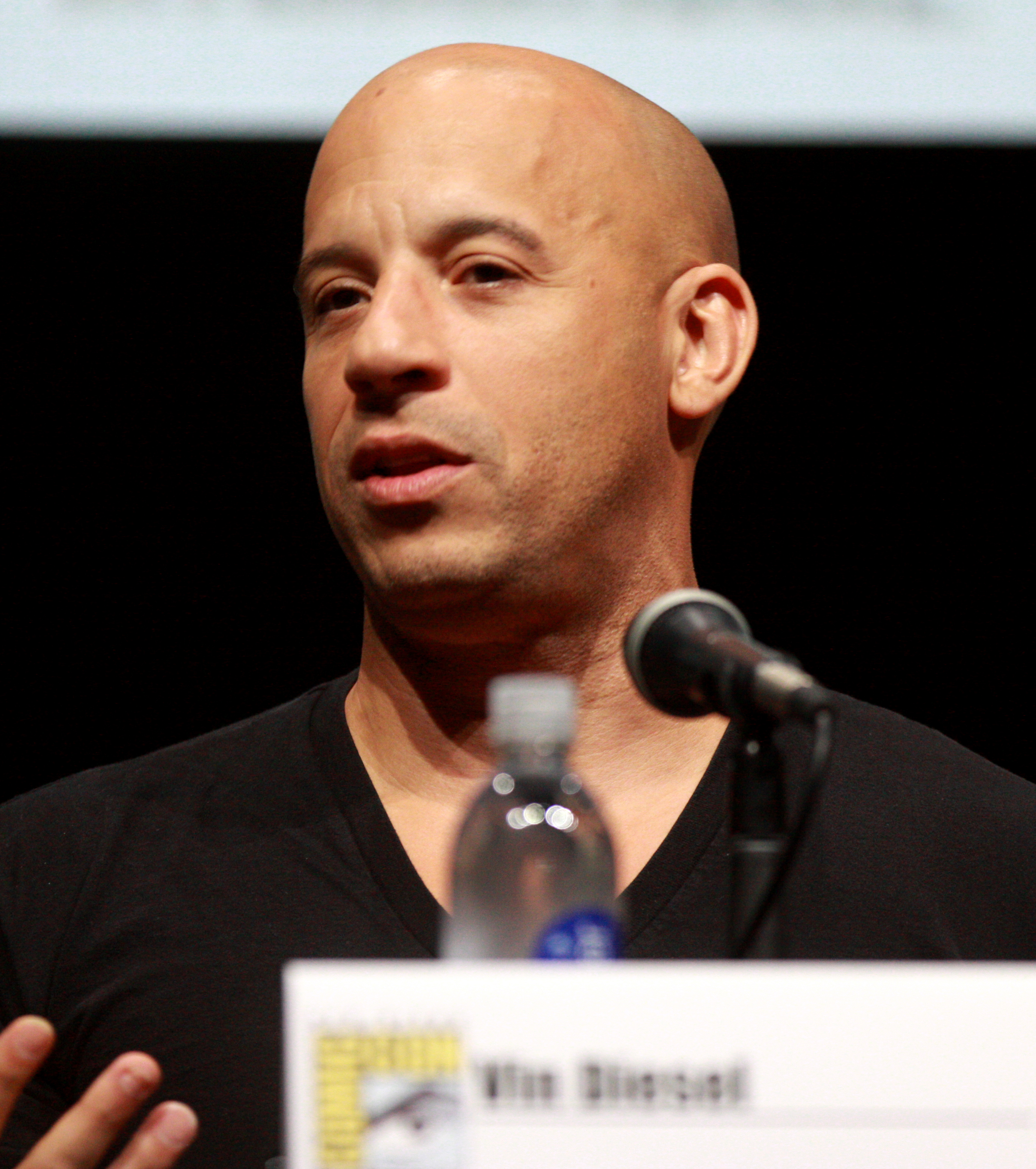
- Diesel at the 2013 San Diego Comic Con
- Born: Mark Sinclair Vincent; July 18, 1967 (age 59)
- Occupations: Actor; producer; writer; director
- Years active: 1990–present
- Partner: Paloma Jimenez (2007–present)
- Children: 3

Mark Sinclair Vincent (born July 18, 1967), known professionally as Vin Diesel, is an American actor and filmmaker. One of the world's highest-grossing actors, he gained prominence for portraying Dominic "Dom" Toretto in the Fast & Furious franchise.

Diesel attended Hunter College in New York City, where studies in creative writing led him to begin screenwriting. He wrote, directed, produced, and starred in the short drama film Multi-Facial (1995) and his debut feature Strays (1997). He came to prominence in the late 1990s and first became known for appearing in Steven Spielberg's Saving Private Ryan in 1998. He followed up with commercially successful films such as Boiler Room (2000) and The Pacifier (2005). He gained stardom as a leading action star headlining numerous franchises, including Fast & Furious, XXX, and The Chronicles of Riddick.

His voice acting work includes The Iron Giant (1999), the video games The Chronicles of Riddick: Escape from Butcher Bay (2004) and The Chronicles of Riddick: Assault on Dark Athena (2009), and the voices of Groot I and Groot II in the Marvel Cinematic Universe (MCU); he portrayed the characters in six superhero films, beginning with Guardians of the Galaxy (2014). Diesel has reprised his role as Groot for the Disney+ animated shorts series I Am Groot (2022–2023), the television special The Guardians of the Galaxy Holiday Special (2022), and the animated film Ralph Breaks the Internet (2018).

He founded the production company One Race Films, where he has also served as a producer or executive producer for his star vehicles. Diesel also founded the record label Racetrack Records and video game developer Tigon Studios, providing his voice and motion capture for all of Tigon's releases.

== Early life ==
Mark Sinclair Vincent was born on July 18, 1967. His mother, Delora Sherleen Vincent (née Sinclair), is an astrologer. He was raised by his white mother and adoptive African-American father, Irving H. Vincent, an acting instructor and theater manager. Diesel has stated that he is "of ambiguous ethnicity." His mother has Scottish roots. He has never met his biological father, and has said that "all I know from my mother is that I have connections to many different cultures"; Diesel believes that his parents' relationship would have been illegal in parts of the United States due to anti-miscegenation laws.

Diesel made his stage debut at age seven when he appeared in the children's play Dinosaur Door, written by Barbara Garson. The play was produced at Theater for the New City in New York's Greenwich Village. His involvement in the play came about when he, his brother and some friends had broken into the Theater for the New City space on Jane Street with the intent to vandalize it. They were confronted by the theater's artistic director, Crystal Field, who offered them roles in the upcoming show instead of calling the police. Diesel remained involved with the theater throughout adolescence, going on to attend Hunter College in New York City, where studies in creative writing led him to begin screenwriting. He dropped out of Hunter to pursue acting. He has identified himself as a "multi-faceted" actor.

Sinclair began going by his stage name "Vin Diesel" while working as a bouncer at the New York nightclub Tunnel, wanting a tougher sounding name for his occupation. Vin comes from his mother's married last name Vincent, while the surname Diesel came from his friends due to his tendency to be energetic.

== Career ==
=== 1990–1999: Early struggle and debut ===
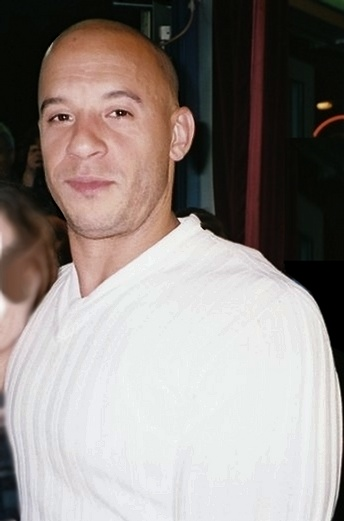
Diesel in 2005

Diesel's first film role was as an uncredited extra in the drama film Awakenings in 1990. After several years of struggle to gain acting roles, Diesel decided to make his own short film to secure funds for his feature film debut. In 1994, he wrote, directed, produced, and starred in the short drama film Multi-Facial, a semi-autobiographical film which follows a struggling multiracial actor stuck in the audition process. The film was selected for screening at the 1995 Cannes Film Festival. As well as acting, Vin Diesel supported himself by working as a bouncer and telemarketer selling lightbulbs.

In 1997, Diesel secured funds to make his first feature-length film, Strays, an urban drama in which he played a gang leader whose love for a woman inspires him to try to change his ways. Written, directed, and produced by Diesel, the film was selected for competition at the 1997 Sundance Festival, leading to an MTV deal to turn it into a series which never came to fruition. Director Steven Spielberg took notice of Diesel after seeing him in Multi-Facial and cast him in a small role as a soldier in his 1998 Oscar-winning war film Saving Private Ryan. This marked Diesel's first major Hollywood film role. In 1999, he provided the voice of the title character in the animated film The Iron Giant.

=== 2000–2008: Breakthrough and setbacks ===
In 2000, Diesel had a supporting role in the drama thriller Boiler Room, where he appeared alongside Giovanni Ribisi and Ben Affleck. He got his breakthrough leading role as the anti-hero Riddick in the science-fiction film Pitch Black later that year.

Diesel attained action hero stardom with his portrayal of Dominic Toretto in the street racing action film The Fast and the Furious (2001) and as Xander Cage in the action thriller XXX (2002). He turned down the chance to reprise his roles in the sequels 2 Fast 2 Furious (2003) and XXX: State of the Union (2005). Instead he chose to reprise his role as Riddick in The Chronicles of Riddick (2004), which was a box office failure considering the large budget. He also voiced the character in two spin-off video games and the anime film The Chronicles of Riddick: Dark Fury.

In a departure from his previous tough guy action hero persona, in 2005, he played a lighthearted role in the action comedy film The Pacifier, which was a box office success.

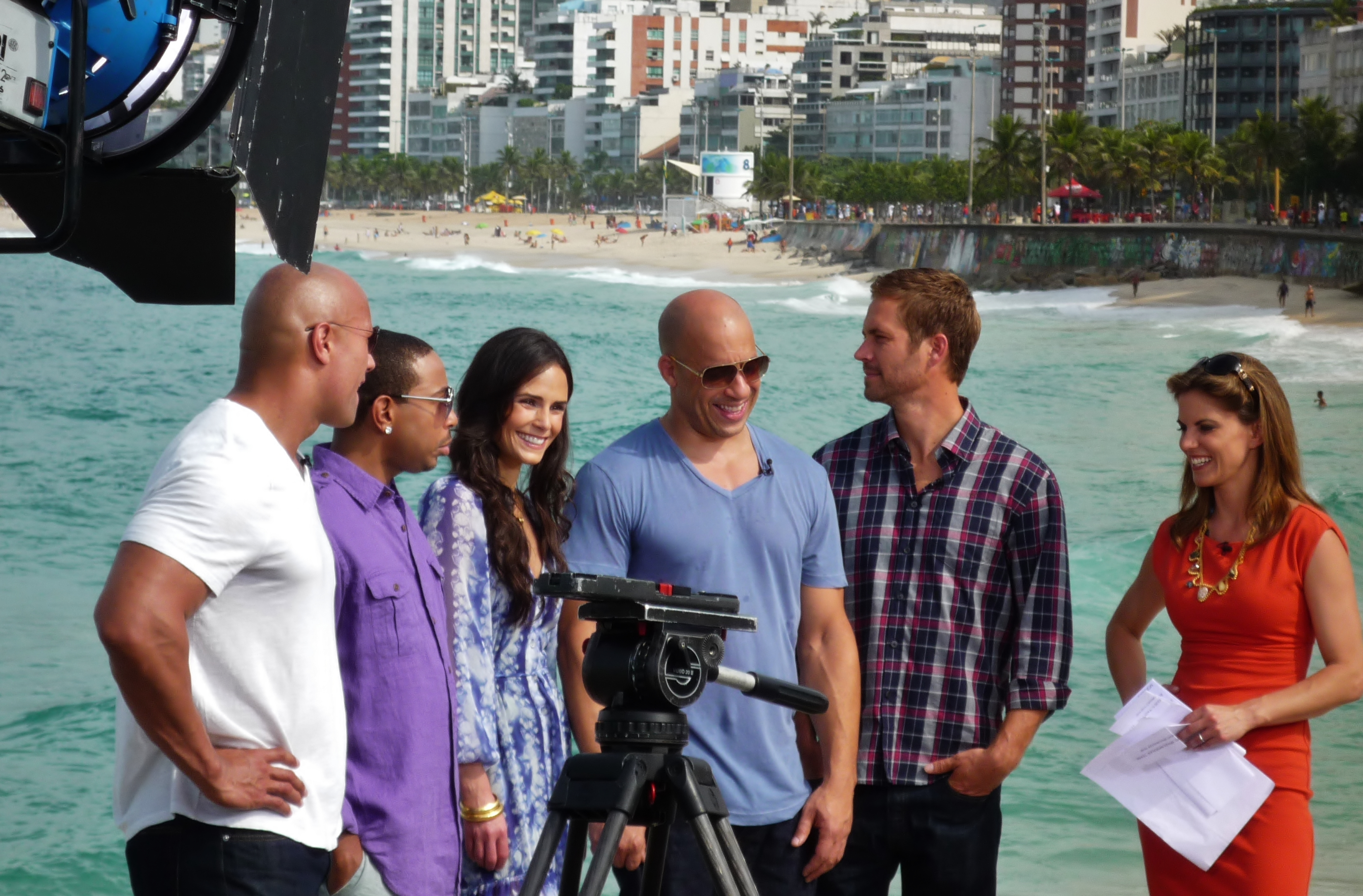
Diesel with the Fast Five cast and Natalie Morales for Today in 2011

In 2006, he chose a dramatic role playing real-life mobster Jack DiNorscio in Find Me Guilty. Although he received critical acclaim for his performance, the film did poorly at the box office grossing only $2 million against a budget of $13 million. Later that year, Diesel made a cameo appearance in The Fast and the Furious: Tokyo Drift, reprising his role from The Fast and the Furious.

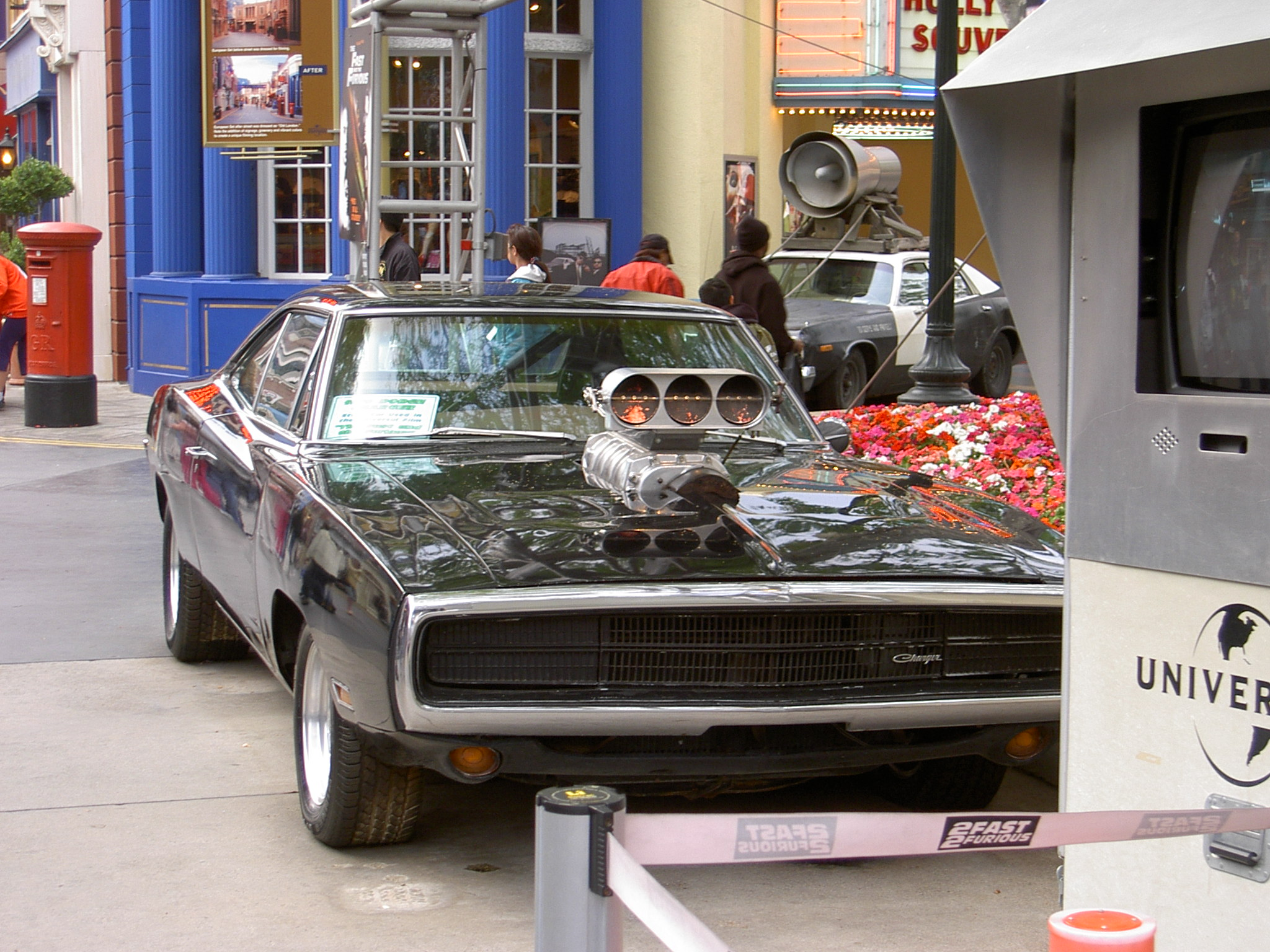
Diesel's main car, a Dodge Charger, from Fast & Furious

In 2007, Diesel was set to produce and star as Agent 47 in the film adaptation of the video game Hitman, but eventually pulled back and served as executive producer on the film instead. In 2008, he starred in the science-fiction action thriller Babylon A.D. which was a critical and box office failure.

=== 2009–present: Franchise films ===
Diesel returned to the Fast & Furious series, alongside most of the principal cast from the original 2001 film, in Fast & Furious, which was released in April 2009.

Diesel reprised his role as Dominic Toretto in later installments of the Fast & Furious franchise, Fast Five (2011), Fast & Furious 6 (2013), Furious 7 (2015), The Fate of the Furious (2017), F9 (2021) and the most recent entry, Fast X (2023). He reprised his role as Riddick in the third film of The Chronicles of Riddick series, simply titled Riddick (2013). In August 2013, Diesel received a star on the Hollywood Walk of Fame. He voiced Groot in the 2014 Marvel Cinematic Universe film Guardians of the Galaxy.

In 2015, he starred in the supernatural action film The Last Witch Hunter. In 2016, Diesel appeared as a supporting character in Ang Lee's war drama Billy Lynn's Long Halftime Walk.

In 2017, Diesel also reprised his roles as Xander Cage in XXX: Return of Xander Cage, and Groot in Guardians of the Galaxy Vol. 2. Over the course of several years, Diesel has discussed playing two separate roles within the Marvel Cinematic Universe. In November 2016 director of Guardians of the Galaxy, James Gunn, confirmed that Diesel had been in talks to play Blackagar Boltagon / Black Bolt for the planned Inhumans film, but it was turned into a television series instead without Diesel involved.

Diesel reprised his role of Groot once again in the crossover films Avengers: Infinity War (2018) and Avengers: Endgame (2019) which combined the superhero teams of Guardians of the Galaxy and The Avengers. He has said, "[I] think there's gonna be a moment that we're all waiting for, and whether you know it or not, you are waiting to see [Groot] and [the Hulk] get down." He always reprised as Groot for the Disney+ animated shorts series I Am Groot which ran from 2022 to 2023.

Diesel portrayed Valiant Comics character Bloodshot in the film of the same name which released in March 2020.

In September 2020, Diesel announced his venture into music, with the release of the song "Feel Like I Do", produced by Kygo. He debuted the song on The Kelly Clarkson Show on September 24, stating: "I am blessed that on a year that I would normally be on a movie set — and as you know, that's not possible — I've had another creative outlet. Another way to show you, or share with you, my heart."

Diesel will star in Riddick: Furya, the fourth installment of The Chronicles of Riddick franchise, announced in February 2023.

== Personal life ==
Diesel has said he prefers to maintain his privacy regarding his personal life, stating: "I'm not gonna put it out there on a magazine cover like some other actors. I come from the Harrison Ford, Marlon Brando, Robert De Niro, Al Pacino code of silence."

Diesel is noted for his distinctive deep voice. He said his voice broke around age 15, giving him a mature-sounding voice on the telephone, which he often uses for his acting performances.

Diesel is a longtime Dungeons & Dragons fan, and wrote the foreword for 30 Years of Adventure: A Celebration of Dungeons & Dragons (2004). Canadian video game designer and developer merritt k created the 2015 ASMR game Vin Diesel DMing a Game of D&D Just for You for him. He has expressed his love for the Dominican Republic and how he relates to its multicultural facets. He is acquainted with its former president, Leonel Fernández, and appeared in one of Fernández's earlier campaign advertisements. He later secured film production in the country for Los Bandoleros and Fast & Furious (both 2009).

In October 2018, Diesel alongside Cody Walker took part in the Xbox Game Pass Challenge, a gaming livestream event which raised $100,000 for Reach Out WorldWide, a nonprofit organization focused on natural disasters and emergencies, which was originally co-founded by his Fast and Furious co-star Paul Walker.

=== Relationships ===
Sometime around 2001, Diesel dated his Fast & Furious co-star Michelle Rodriguez. Since 2007, he has been in a relationship with Mexican model Paloma Jimenez; the couple have three children, two daughters born in April 2008 and March 2015, and a son born 2010. The younger daughter is named in honor of his co-star and close friend Paul Walker, who died in November 2013. He is also the godfather of Walker's daughter, Meadow. Diesel also shares a close friendship with Fast & Furious co-star Tyrese Gibson.

=== Legal issues ===
In December 2023, former assistant Asta Jonasson sued Diesel for sexual battery and retaliation. The lawsuit alleges that, in 2010 during the filming of Fast Five in Atlanta, he brought her to his suite at the St. Regis Hotel and forced her onto his bed. Jonasson accuses him of "forcibly grabbing [her] and groping her breasts, and kissing her chest... and trying to pull down her underwear". She further accused him of pressing her against the wall and forcing her to touch his erect penis, and then he began to masturbate. She was fired a few days later which she believes was retaliatory with the suit reading, "It was clear to her that she was being fired because she was no longer useful—Vin Diesel had used her to fulfill his sexual desires and she had resisted his sexual assaults". The lawsuit also names Diesel's sister and production company as defendants for allegedly creating a hostile work environment and wrongfully terminating her, among other complaints.

On June 3, 2025, the court dismissed the four claims against Diesel filed under California's Fair Employment and Housing Act (FEHA), ruling that the extended statute of limitations for sexual assault claims did not apply to FEHA's administrative filing deadline. As of June 2025, a jury trial on the remaining claims, including sexual battery, was scheduled for August. On November 19, 2025, Judge Daniel M. Crowley dismissed the remaining claims in a summary judgment ruling, finding that California law did not apply to the alleged conduct, which took place in Georgia. The ruling did not address whether the allegations were true. Diesel's attorney has said he denies the claims. Jonasson filed a notice of appeal on February 10, 2026, challenging both of Crowley's 2025 rulings; the appeal is pending in the California Court of Appeal. Her opening brief was filed on June 5, 2026. The respondents' brief was due October 26, 2026; as of October 28, it had not been filed, and the court notified the respondents.

== Filmography ==
=== Film ===
Year	Title	Role	Notes
1990	Awakenings	Orderly	Uncredited
1991	New Jack City	Bouncer	Uncredited
1995	Multi-Facial	Mike	Short film; also writer, director and producer
1997	Strays	Rick	Also writer, director and producer
1998	Saving Private Ryan	Private Adrian Caparzo	
1999	The Iron Giant	The Iron Giant (voice)	
2000	Boiler Room	Chris Varick	
2000	Pitch Black	Richard B. Riddick	
2001	The Fast and the Furious	Dominic Toretto	
2001	Knockaround Guys	Taylor Reese	
2002	XXX	Xander Cage	Also executive producer
2003	The Turbo Charged Prelude for 2 Fast 2 Furious	Dominic Toretto	Short film; uncredited; archive footage
2003	A Man Apart	Sean Vetter	Also producer
2004	The Chronicles of Riddick	Richard B. Riddick	Also producer
2004	The Chronicles of Riddick: Dark Fury	Richard B. Riddick (voice)	Short film
2005	The Pacifier	Lieutenant Shane Wolfe	
2006	Find Me Guilty	Jackie DiNorscio	
2006	The Fast and the Furious: Tokyo Drift	Dominic Toretto	Uncredited cameo
2007	Hitman	—N/a	Executive producer only
2008	Babylon A.D.	Hugo Cornelius Toorop	
2009	Fast & Furious	Dominic Toretto	Also producer
2009	Los Bandoleros	Dominic Toretto	Short film; also writer, director, producer
2011	Fast Five	Dominic Toretto	Also producer
2013	Fast & Furious 6	Dominic Toretto	Also producer
2013	Riddick: Blindsided	Richard B. Riddick (voice)	Short film
2013	Riddick	Richard B. Riddick	Also producer
2014	Guardians of the Galaxy	Groot (voice)	
2015	Furious 7	Dominic Toretto	Also producer
2015	The Last Witch Hunter	Kaulder	Also producer
2016	Billy Lynn's Long Halftime Walk	Shroom	
2017	XXX: Return of Xander Cage	Xander Cage	Also producer
2017	The Fate of the Furious	Dominic Toretto	Also producer
2017	Guardians of the Galaxy Vol. 2	Groot (voice)	
2018	Avengers: Infinity War	Groot (voice)	
2018	Ralph Breaks the Internet	Groot (voice)	Cameo appearance
2019	Avengers: Endgame	Groot (voice)	
2020	Bloodshot	Ray Garrison / Bloodshot	Also producer
2021	F9	Dominic Toretto	Also producer
2022	Thor: Love and Thunder	Groot (voice)	
2023	Guardians of the Galaxy Vol. 3	Groot (voice)	
2023	Fast X	Dominic Toretto	Also producer

=== Television ===
Vin Diesel in television
Year	Title	Role	Notes
2019, 2021	Fast & Furious Spy Racers	Dominic Toretto (voice)	4 episodes; Executive producer
2022–2023	I Am Groot	Groot (voice)	Main role; 10 episodes
2022	The Guardians of the Galaxy Holiday Special	Groot (voice)	Television special
2023	Marvel Studios: Assembled	Himself	Episode: "The Making of Guardians of the Galaxy Vol. 3 "
2024	Ark: The Animated Series	Santiago Da Costa (voice)	Also executive producer

Key
†	Denotes television productions that have not yet been released

=== Video games ===
Vin Diesel in video games
Year	Title	Voice role	Notes
2004	The Chronicles of Riddick: Escape from Butcher Bay	Richard B. Riddick	
2009	Wheelman	Milo Burik	
2009	The Chronicles of Riddick: Assault on Dark Athena	Richard B. Riddick	
2020	Fast & Furious Crossroads	Dominic Toretto	
TBA	Ark 2	Santiago Da Costa	Also executive producer

=== Other ===
Year	Title	Role	Notes
2015	Fast & Furious: Supercharged	Dominic Toretto	Attraction at Universal Studios Florida

== Discography ==
=== Singles ===
Title	Year	Album
"Feel Like I Do"	2020	Non-album singles
"Days Are Gone"	2020	Non-album singles

== Awards and nominations ==
Year	Award	Category	Work	Result
1999	Screen Actors Guild Award	Outstanding Performance by a Cast	Saving Private Ryan	Nominated (Note: Shared with the rest of the cast)
1999	Online Film Critics Society Award	Best Cast	Saving Private Ryan	Won
2001	Blockbuster Entertainment Award	Favorite Actor	Pitch Black	Nominated
2002	MTV Movie Awards	Best Male Performance	The Fast and the Furious	Nominated
2002	MTV Movie Awards	Best On-Screen Team	The Fast and the Furious	Won (Note: Shared with Paul Walker)
2002	Black Reel Award	Best Actor	The Fast and the Furious	Nominated
2003	MTV Movie Award	Best Male Performance	xXx	Nominated
2003	Teen Choice Award	Choice Movie Actor: Drama/Action Adventure	xXx; A Man Apart	Nominated
2004	Spike Video Game Award	Best Performance by a Human Male	The Chronicles of Riddick: Escape from Butcher Bay	Nominated
2005	Interactive Achievement Award	Outstanding Character Performance - Male	The Chronicles of Riddick: Escape from Butcher Bay	Nominated
2005	Teen Choice Award	Choice Movie Actor: Comedy	The Pacifier	Nominated
2005	Golden Raspberry Award	Worst Actor	The Chronicles of Riddick	Nominated
2005	Video Software Dealers Association Award	Male Star of the Year	The Chronicles of Riddick	Won
2009	Spike Video Game Award	Best Performance by a Human Male	The Chronicles of Riddick: Assault on Dark Athena	Nominated
2009	MTV Movie Award	Best Male Performance	Fast & Furious	Nominated
2010	People's Choice Award	Favorite Action Star	Fast & Furious	Nominated
2011	CinemaCon Award	Action Star of the Year	Fast Five	Won
2011	Teen Choice Award	Choice Movie Actor	Fast Five	Nominated
2012	Image Award	Outstanding Actor in a Motion Picture	Fast Five	Nominated
2012	Black Reel Award	Best Cast Ensemble	Fast Five	Nominated
2012	People's Choice Award	Favorite Action Star	Fast Five	Nominated
2013	Teen Choice Award	Choice Movie: Chemistry	Fast & Furious 6	Nominated (Note: Shared with Paul Walker and Dwayne Johnson)
2014	People's Choice Award	Favorite Action Movie Actor	Fast & Furious 6	Nominated
2014	MTV Movie Award	Best On-Screen Duo	Fast & Furious 6	Won
2015	Phoenix Film Critics Society	Best Cast	Guardians of the Galaxy	Nominated
2015	Black Reel Award	Outstanding Voice Performance	Guardians of the Galaxy	Nominated
2015	Teen Choice Awards	Choice Movie Actor: Action	Furious 7	Won
2015	Teen Choice Awards	Choice Movie: Chemistry	Furious 7	Nominated
2016	People's Choice Awards	Favorite Movie	Furious 7	Won
2016	People's Choice Awards	Favorite Action Movie	Furious 7	Won
2016	People's Choice Awards	Favorite Action Movie Actor	N/A	Nominated
2018	Black Reel Award	Outstanding Voice Performance	Guardians of the Galaxy Vol. 2	Won
2022	Nickelodeon Kids' Choice Award	Favorite Movie Actor	F9: The Fast Saga	Nominated
2024	Golden Raspberry Award	Worst Actor	Fast X	Nominated
