= Pitch Black (film) =

2000 American film by David Twohy

- Theatrical release poster
- Directed by: David Twohy
- Screenplay by: Ken Wheat; Jim Wheat; David Twohy
- Story by: Ken Wheat; Jim Wheat
- Produced by: Tom Engelman
- Starring: Vin Diesel; Radha Mitchell; Cole Hauser; Lewis Fitz-Gerald; Claudia Black; Keith David
- Cinematography: David Eggby
- Edited by: Rick Shaine
- Music by: Graeme Revell
- Production companies: Gramercy Pictures; PolyGram Filmed Entertainment; Interscope Communications
- Distributed by: USA Films (United States); Universal Pictures (International)
- Release date: February 18, 2000
- Running time: 108 minutes
- Country: United States
- Language: English
- Budget: $23 million
- Box office: $53.2 million

Pitch Black (titled The Chronicles of Riddick: Pitch Black on later re-releases) is a 2000 American science fiction action horror film directed by David Twohy and co-written by Twohy and brothers Ken and Jim Wheat from a story conceived by the Wheats. The film stars Vin Diesel, Radha Mitchell, Cole Hauser, Claudia Black and Keith David. Dangerous criminal Riddick (Diesel) is being transported to prison in a spacecraft, and escapes when the spaceship is damaged by comet debris and crash lands on an empty desert planet. When predatory creatures begin attacking the survivors, Riddick joins forces with them to escape the planet.

Pitch Black was the final film credit of PolyGram Filmed Entertainment, which merged with Universal Pictures during production. It was shot on a modest budget of US$23 million. Pitch Black was released on February 18, 2000, by USA Films and received mixed reviews from critics, who praised some inventive elements, the film's visual style, and Diesel's performance, but criticized a failure to fully expand on the core premise and some cliched characterizations. It was a sleeper hit, grossing over $53 million worldwide, and started a franchise centered on the antihero Riddick. A sequel, The Chronicles of Riddick, was released in 2004 by Universal, with Diesel back as the title character and Twohy returning as writer and director. A third film, titled Riddick, was released in 2013, with Diesel and Twohy reuniting again.

== Plot ==
In the year 2678, the spaceship Hunter-Gratzner is struck by micrometeoroids that penetrate the hull, killing the captain and sending it off course toward a nearby planet. First Officer Owens and docking pilot Carolyn Fry attempt an emergency landing. As the ship descends uncontrollably, a panicked Fry prepares to jettison the passengers held in cryostasis to save herself, but Owens intervenes. The ship crash-lands, killing Owens and most of the passengers. The survivors include Fry; Imam Abu al-Walid, escorting three young students (Ali, Hassan and Suleiman) to New Mecca; a teenage boy named Jack; prospectors Shazza and Zeke; wealthy merchant Paris; law enforcement officer William J. Johns; and his prisoner, the dangerous and enigmatic criminal Richard B. Riddick, who escapes in the confusion.

While searching for him across the sun-scorched and seemingly barren planet, the group discovers an abandoned geological research settlement with a nonfunctional dropship. When Zeke goes missing, the survivors suspect Riddick. However, Fry investigates a nearby underground cave where she is attacked by aggressive creatures and narrowly escapes. Johns recaptures Riddick and offers to release him in exchange for helping them escape the planet.

While exploring the settlement, one of the students, Ali, disturbs a cluster of juvenile creatures, which devour him before retreating underground to avoid the sun, revealing a fatal vulnerability to light. Using an orrery, Fry discovers that a total eclipse —occurring every twenty-two years— is imminent. Once darkness falls, the creatures will emerge to hunt, explaining the fate of the previous settlers. As tension builds, both Johns and Riddick try to win Fry to their side: Fry recounts Riddick's cold pragmatism, while Riddick exposes Johns as a morphine-addicted bounty hunter who had refused to use his drugs to ease Owens' agonizing death.

The group races back to the Hunter-Gratzner to retrieve power cells for the dropship, but the total eclipse begins, unleashing thousands of flying creatures that kill Shazza. The survivors take shelter inside the Hunter-Gratzner, but the creatures breach it and devour Hassan. Realizing they must reach the dropship, they enlist Riddick—whose surgically enhanced eyes grant him night vision—to guide them through the darkness. Armed with available and improvised light sources, the group sets out.

When the group reaches a narrow canyon teeming with creatures, Paris panics, runs, and is killed. Riddick reveals that Jack is actually a girl disguising herself as a boy, and her menstrual blood is attracting the creatures. In private, Johns suggests to Riddick that they wound Jack and leave her behind as a distraction. Riddick pretends to agree, then attacks Johns—injuring him and leaving him to be killed by the creatures.

At Riddick's urging, the remaining group sprints through the canyon as the creatures begin cannibalizing one another. After reaching the other side, rain begins to fall, extinguishing their improvised torches. Suleiman is killed in the ensuing attack. Riddick initially moves on alone but ultimately returns to fight off the creatures and save Jack. He hides Fry, Abu al-Walid, and Jack in a cave, then sets out to retrieve the dropship. Suspicious, Fry follows and finds him preparing to take off and abandon them.

Fry pleads with Riddick to help her save the others, but he urges her to escape with him instead. Guilt-ridden over her earlier attempt to sacrifice her passengers, she refuses, admitting she would now die to protect the others. Together, they rescue Abu al-Walid and Jack (with small, bioluminescent native lifeforms), but Riddick is cornered and wounded by the creatures. Fry returns to save him, but she is fatally stabbed by one of the creatures and carried off.

Riddick returns to the ship but delays takeoff, allowing the creatures to gather around it before using the engines to incinerate as many as possible. Once in space, Jack asks what they should tell the authorities about him; he tells them that Riddick died on the planet.

== Cast ==
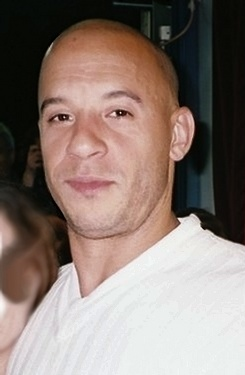
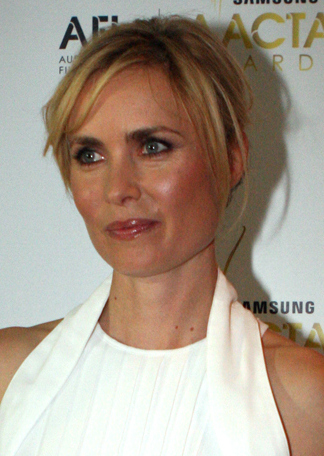
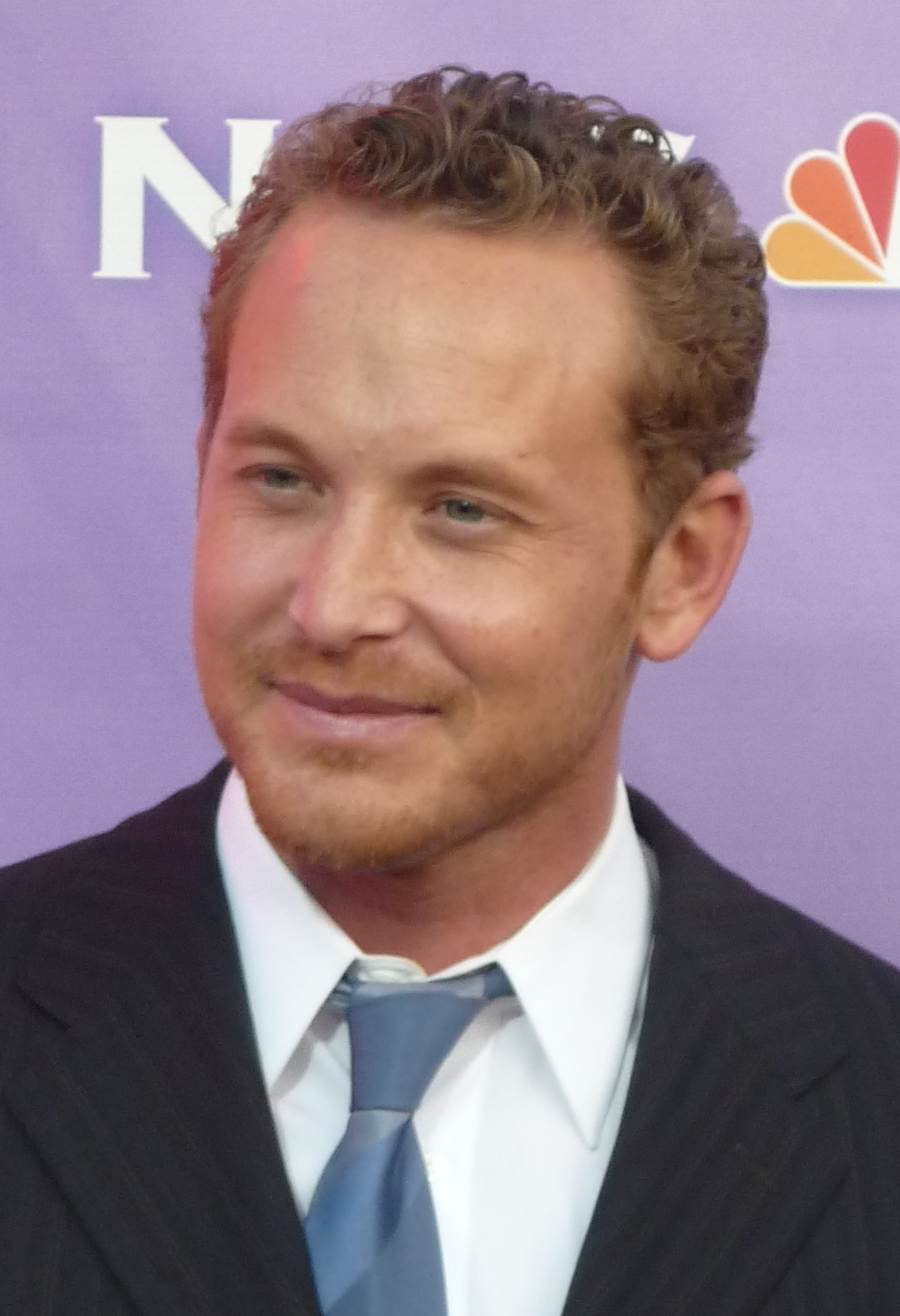
Vin Diesel (pictured in 2005), Radha Mitchell (2012), and Cole Hauser (2010)
- Vin Diesel as Richard B. Riddick. A highly skilled and infamous criminal and murderer. Riddick's surgically altered eyes allow him to see in the dark but make him sensitive to light.
- Radha Mitchell as Carolyn Fry, a docking pilot for the transport ship Hunter-Gratzner.
- Cole Hauser as William J. Johns, a bounty hunter and morphine addict posing as a lawman.
- Rhiana Griffith as Jack, a young girl who disguises herself as a boy to fit in.
- Keith David as Abu al-Walid, an Imam who is travelling to New Mecca.
- Lewis Fitz-Gerald as Paris P. Ogilvie, an antiques dealer who sells weaponry and art.
- Claudia Black as Sharon "Shazza" Montgomery, a free settler who is travelling across the universe looking for a new home.
- John Moore as John "Zeke" Ezekiel, Shazza's companion.
- Simon Burke as Greg Owens, First Officer of the Hunter-Gratzner.
- Les Chantery as Suleiman, a young pilgrim
- Sam Sari as Hassan, a young pilgrim
- Firass Dirani as Ali, a young pilgrim
- Ric Anderson as Total Stranger, a surviving passenger mistakenly shot dead by Zeke.
- Vic Wilson as Captain Tom Mitchell, who dies in the crash of the Hunter-Gratzner

== Production ==
According to Ken and Jim Wheat, the original concept of Pitch Black was suggested by David Madden during his tenure in Interscope Communications. His initial premise was: "[t]ravelers visit a planet where multiple suns mean perpetual daylight, but when an eclipse brings darkness, ghosts emerge." These "ghost" antagonists survived the first draft, but were later replaced by physical predators. Interscope approached David Twohy with the concept, letting him direct if he could refine the screenplay. Twohy had worked on an early version of Alien 3, and was aware that Pitch Black's concept had similarities to that franchise. He proposed changes to character arcs in the script. Said Twohy:

I've got three characters in this film who not only change from where they begin but also change from where you expect them to end up ... I had three leads, and they each thought they were the lead, which made for a lot of ego problems on the set. But ego problems are not always a bad thing.

Most of the filming, including all of the external locations, took place in and around Coober Pedy, South Australia. It was winter in the region, and rain before the shoot caused filming delays. Most interior sequences were shot at the Village Roadshow Studios, in Oxenford, Queensland. In Los Angeles, New Deal Studios were used for miniature photography and the interior sequence of the spaceship crash. To highlight the different suns for some of the daytime sequences, the filmmakers used a bleach bypass process during post-production.

== Reception ==
=== Box office ===
Pitch Black opened in 1,832 theaters on 18 February 2000, grossing $11,577,688 over its opening weekend and ranking 4th at the box office. The film has a domestic gross of $39,240,659 and an international gross of $13,947,000, giving it a worldwide total of $53,187,659.

=== Critical response ===
At review aggregation website Rotten Tomatoes, it has a 59% approval rating based on 113 reviews, with an average rating of 5.70/10. The site's consensus reads: "Despite an interesting premise (and a starmaking turn from Vin Diesel), Pitch Black is too derivative and formulaic to fully recommend to sci-fi or action fans". On Metacritic, the film has a weighted average score of 49 out of 100, based on 29 critics, indicating "mixed or average reviews".

James Berardinelli of ReelViews gave the film 3 out of 4 stars and stated, "It's not an especially challenging part, but Diesel handles it with aplomb." BBC.com gave the film 3 out of 5 stars and stated it as "an entertainment and quite a good one too." Peter Bradshaw of Guardian gave the film a positive review and stated that the film "undoubtedly has something interesting about it, and that something can be summarized in two words: Vin Diesel." Nathan Rabin of A.V. Club gave the film a positive review and stated that the film "falters a bit in its last half-hour" and "reduces Diesel to delivering a pithy one-liner-but for the most part, it's terrific."

San Francisco Chronicle gave the film 0 out of 4 stars and called the film "a tiresome experience." Austin Chronicle gave the film 2 out of 5 stars and called the film "a very streamlined exercise in interplanetary mayhem and the logistics of the body count." Roger Ebert of Chicago Sun-Times gave the film 2 out of 4 stars, stating Pitch Black was inferior to Twohy's The Arrival (1996) and adding: "how sad it is that humans travel countless light years away from Earth, only to find themselves inhabiting the same tired generic conventions."

=== Accolades ===
Year	Award	Category	Recipient	Result
2000	Saturn Award	Best Science Fiction Film	Pitch Black	Nominated
2001	Australian Cinematographers Society Award	Cinematographer of the Year	David Eggby	Won
2001	Australian Cinematographers Society Award	Golden Tripod	David Eggby	Won
2001	Blockbuster Entertainment Award	Favorite Actor - Horror	Vin Diesel	Nominated
2001	Bram Stoker Award	Best Screenplay	David Twohy, Jim Wheat and Ken Wheat	Nominated
2001	International Horror Guild Award	Best Movie	Pitch Black	Nominated

== Home media ==
Pitch Black was released on VHS and DVD on October 10, 2000, by Universal Studios Home Video. It was re-released on DVD in 2004 as The Chronicles of Riddick: Pitch Black. The Chronicles of Riddick: Pitch Black was also officially released as part of the Riddick Trilogy DVD collection (alongside The Chronicles of Riddick: Dark Fury and The Chronicles of Riddick) on May 30, 2006. It was later released on HD DVD on July 11, 2006, and on Blu-ray on March 31, 2009. The disc contains the theatrical edition and an unrated director's cut edition, containing 3 more minutes of extra material. A LaserDisc release was also planned, but cancelled by mid-2001 due to waning support for that format. In 2020, the year of the film's 20th Anniversary, Arrow Video released Pitch Black on 4K Ultra HD Blu-ray.

== Franchise ==
=== Sequels ===
The movie's sequel, The Chronicles of Riddick (2004), was also directed by David Twohy. To tie in with the sequel, the film was novelized under the name The Chronicles of Riddick: Pitch Black, which was written by Frank Lauria.

Riddick, a live-action sequel to The Chronicles of Riddick, opened on September 6, 2013, with both David Twohy and Vin Diesel attached. The sequel ties in more closely to the original Pitch Black.

Riddick: Furya, the fourth installment was announced in February 2023. Vin Diesel will again appear in the film and David Twohy has written the script and will direct the film. Filming began in August 2024.

=== Short film ===
A short animated movie released the same year, The Chronicles of Riddick: Dark Fury (2004), was directed by Peter Chung. Dark Fury bridges the gap between Pitch Black and Chronicles of Riddick.

=== Television special ===
Into Pitch Black (2000) is a Sci-Fi Channel special that includes clips from Pitch Black and takes place before and after the events of the film. Inconsistencies with the storyline of later sequels have made it non-canonical.

== Video games ==
The Chronicles of Riddick: Escape from Butcher Bay, a game for the Xbox and the PC, was released in 2004 to critical acclaim. A remake of Butcher Bay, including a new campaign set after Butcher Bay, was released for the Xbox 360, PlayStation 3 and PC on 7 April 2009, under the title The Chronicles of Riddick: Assault on Dark Athena.

== See also ==
- List of films featuring eclipses
