= Tigon Studios =

American video game company

- Company type: Subsidiary
- Industry: Video games
- Founded: 2002
- Founder: Vin Diesel
- Headquarters: Bellevue, Washington, U.S.
- Products: The Chronicles of Riddick: Escape from Butcher Bay; Wheelman; Riddick: The Merc Files; Fast & Furious Crossroads
- Owner: One Race Films
- Website: tigonstudios.com

Tigon Studios is a video game developer owned by One Race Films focused primarily on games featuring actor Vin Diesel, who also founded the company. Following a suspension of development work, Diesel reactivated the company in September 2013. As the name of the company implies, a tigon appears in the logo.

== Games ==
The Chronicles of Riddick: Escape from Butcher Bay

The Chronicles of Riddick: Escape from Butcher Bay is set before the films Pitch Black and The Chronicles of Riddick. It is a first-person shooter.

Wheelman

Wheelman is a driving game developed by Midway Studios Newcastle and published by Ubisoft and Midway Games for the PlayStation 3, Xbox 360 and Microsoft Windows.

The game is set in an open-world environment modeled after Barcelona, full of destructible objects, alleyways, shortcuts through office blocks and a total of 31 story missions and 105 side missions. While most missions are driving-oriented, there are also foot missions that are played from a third-person perspective and which incorporate a cover system.

The Chronicles of Riddick: Assault on Dark Athena

The Chronicles of Riddick: Assault on Dark Athena is another game in the Riddick universe for the Xbox 360, PlayStation 3 and Microsoft Windows. It also contains a remake of Escape From Butcher Bay. Vivendi Games, Sierra Entertainment, Tigon Games, Starbreeze Studios and Universal Pictures worked on the project, featuring new content and new features. After the Activision-Blizzard merger, the game was dropped. It has since been picked up by Atari and was released on April 7, 2009.

Riddick: The Merc Files

Riddick: The Merc Files is a top-down view stealth-action game where the player controls Riddick, completing various objectives while escaping from mercenaries. Even though the gameplay focuses on stealth, the player has the option to use melee attacks and guns to take down enemies. However, using stealth attacks and remaining undetected generated more points for the player. The game was developed by Gaming Corps in Uppsala/Sweden and released on September 20, 2013, through iTunes for iPhone and iPad.

Fast & Furious Crossroads

Fast & Furious Crossroads is a racing and action role-playing game based on the Fast & Furious film franchise. It is developed by Slightly Mad Studios, a subsidiary studio of the British developer Codemasters, co-developed by Tigon Studios and published by Bandai Namco Entertainment.

=== In development ===
Barca B.C.

In 2006, Barca B.C. was developed as a MMORPG. Later, the genre was changed into a third-person action real-time strategy. It is based on the historical Punic Wars of Hannibal Barca. The player controls Hannibal's forces during his historical campaigns against Rome.
