= David Twohy =

American film director and screenwriter

- Twohy in 2013
- Born: David Neil Twohy; October 18, 1955 (age 70); Los Angeles County, California, U.S.
- Occupations: Director, screenwriter
- Years active: 1988–present
- Website: davidtwohy.com

David Neil Twohy (/ˈtuːi/ TOO-ee; born October 18, 1955) is an American film director and screenwriter. He is known for working on science fiction-action films, most notably The Chronicles of Riddick series.

== Early life and education ==
Twohy was born in Los Angeles County, California and attended Palos Verdes High School. He attended college at California State University, Long Beach, graduating with a degree in radio/television/film.

== Career ==
His most notable filmmaking credits have been writing The Fugitive, Waterworld, and GI Jane, but he is mostly known for writing and directing The Arrival and all three feature films in the Chronicles of Riddick franchise.

He has a cameo in Below as the British captain of the rescue ship.

Riddick: Furya, the fourth installment of The Chronicles of Riddick was announced in February 2023. Twohy has written the script and will direct the film.

== Filmography ==
Feature films
Year	Title	Director	Writer	Notes
1988	Critters 2: The Main Course	No	Yes	
1989	Warlock	No	Yes	
1992	Timescape	Yes	Yes	Directorial debut
1993	The Fugitive	No	Yes	
1994	Terminal Velocity	No	Yes	Also executive producer
1995	Waterworld	No	Yes	
1996	The Arrival	Yes	Yes	
1997	G.I. Jane	No	Yes	
2000	Pitch Black	Yes	Yes	
2001	Impostor	No	Yes	
2002	Below	Yes	Yes	Cameo as "British Captain"
2004	The Chronicles of Riddick	Yes	Yes	
2009	A Perfect Getaway	Yes	Yes	
2013	Riddick	Yes	Yes	
TBA	Riddick: Furya	Yes	Yes	Filming

Short films
Year	Title	Director	Writer	Producer
2000	Pitch Black: Slam City	Yes	Yes	Yes
2004	The Chronicles of Riddick: Dark Fury	No	Story	No
2013	Riddick: Blindsided	No	Yes	Yes

TV series
Year	Title	Director	Writer	Producer
TBD	Merc City	No	Yes	No

Uncredited writing works
Year	Title	Notes
1992	Alien 3	Early draft
1995	Last Gasp	TV movie
