= Ken and Jim Wheat =

American screenwriter

Ken Wheat (born 1950) and Jim Wheat (born 1952) are an American screenwriting, producing, and directing duo. Mainly known for their horror films, the brothers co-wrote the slasher film The Silent Scream (1979), as well as A Nightmare on Elm Street 4: The Dream Master (1988) and The Fly II (1989). They wrote and directed the 1985 Star Wars television film Ewoks: The Battle for Endor and the 1989 anthology horror film After Midnight. They later devised the story and co-wrote the screenplay of the science fiction horror film Pitch Black (2000).

== Filmography ==
Film

Year	Title	Directors	Writers	Producers
1979	Silent Scream	No	Yes	Yes
1980	The Return	No	Yes	No
1983	Lies	Yes	Yes	Yes
1988	A Nightmare on Elm Street 4: The Dream Master	No	Yes	No
1989	The Fly II	No	Yes	No
1989	After Midnight	Yes	Yes	Yes
2000	Pitch Black	No	Yes	No

Executive producers

- American Boy: A Profile of Steven Prince (1978) (Documentary film)

TV movies

Year	Title	Directors	Writers
1985	Ewoks: The Battle for Endor	Yes	Yes
1994	The Birds II: Land's End	No	Yes
1994	Trick of the Eye	No	Yes
1996	It Came from Outer Space II	No	Yes
1996	Rattled	No	Yes
1996	The Stepford Husbands	No	Yes
1999	Free Fall	No	Yes
