= Adrienne Munich =

Adrienne Auslander Munich is an American professor emerita of English literature. She is known for her books about the Victorian era including Andromeda's Chains and Queen Victoria's Secrets.

== Biography ==
Adrienne Munich was born on 13 March 1939 in Michigan. She was educated at the University of Michigan and Brandeis University where she earned her B.A. in comparative literature. She took a MAT teaching degree at Yale University, teaching for a while at the University of Kentucky. She gained her Ph.D. in 1976 at the Graduate Center of the City University of New York.

She was a professor of English at Stony Brook University. She is an editor of the Victorian Literature and Culture journal. She states that feminism enabled her to write about Victorian figures like Elizabeth Barrett Browning.

== Reception ==
Lynn Alexander writes that Andromeda's Chains examines how artists and authors in the Victorian era and earlier made use of the myth of Andromeda. She found the treatment repetitive with a similar story for each artist. She states that Munich argues that attitudes to the myth shifted in the Victorian era, making Andromeda more passive "from a fear of female vitalism" and "sentimentalisation of marriage".

Barbara Garlick, reviewing Queen Victoria's Secrets, writes that Munich has written a lively and extended treatment of the centrality of Victoria's image in her era, calling the book "intriguing and entertaining".

Ce Rosenow writes that the editors frame the essays in Amy Lowell: American Modern around earlier dismissals of Lowell's poetry, and the lack of scholarship on her. They suggest that homophobia and Lowell's constant experimentation in her verse may have helped to cause that neglect. Rosenow finds that the book makes it hard "not to see Lowell's importance to the modernist movement".

== Books ==
- 1979 Robert Browning: A Collection of Critical Essays (ed., with Harold Bloom)
- 1989 Andromeda's Chains
- 1996 Queen Victoria's Secrets
- 1997 Remaking Queen Victoria
- 2003 Victorian Literature and Culture (with John Maynard)
- 2004 Amy Lowell, American Modern (ed., with Melissa Bradshaw)
- 2011 Fashion in Film
- 2020 Empire of Diamonds: Victorian Gems in Imperial Settings
