= Autochthe =

In Greek mythology, Autochthe (Ancient Greek: Αὐτόχθη, romanized: Autókhthē) was a Mycenaean princess and one of the Perseids, as a daughter of Perseus and Andromeda.

== Family ==
Autochthe was a daughter of King Perseus and Queen Andromeda of Mycenae, and thus likely the sister of Perses, Alcaeus, Sthenelus, Heleus, Mestor, Electryon and Gorgophone.

== Mythology ==
Autochthe married Aegeus and had by him several daughters, but no sons. Some traditions held that she was the only spouse of Aegeus, yet in other accounts, the latter was said to have married and divorced several times because none of his wives (Meta, daughter of Hoples, and Chalciope, daughter of Rhexenor or Chalcodon) bore him male heirs, which put his kingdom at risk of being usurped by his brothers.

This marriage between Autochthe and Aegeus might have been political as well, since marriage with one of the Perseids would mean alliance between Argos and Athens.
