= Perseids (mythology) =

Descendants of Perseus in Greek mythology

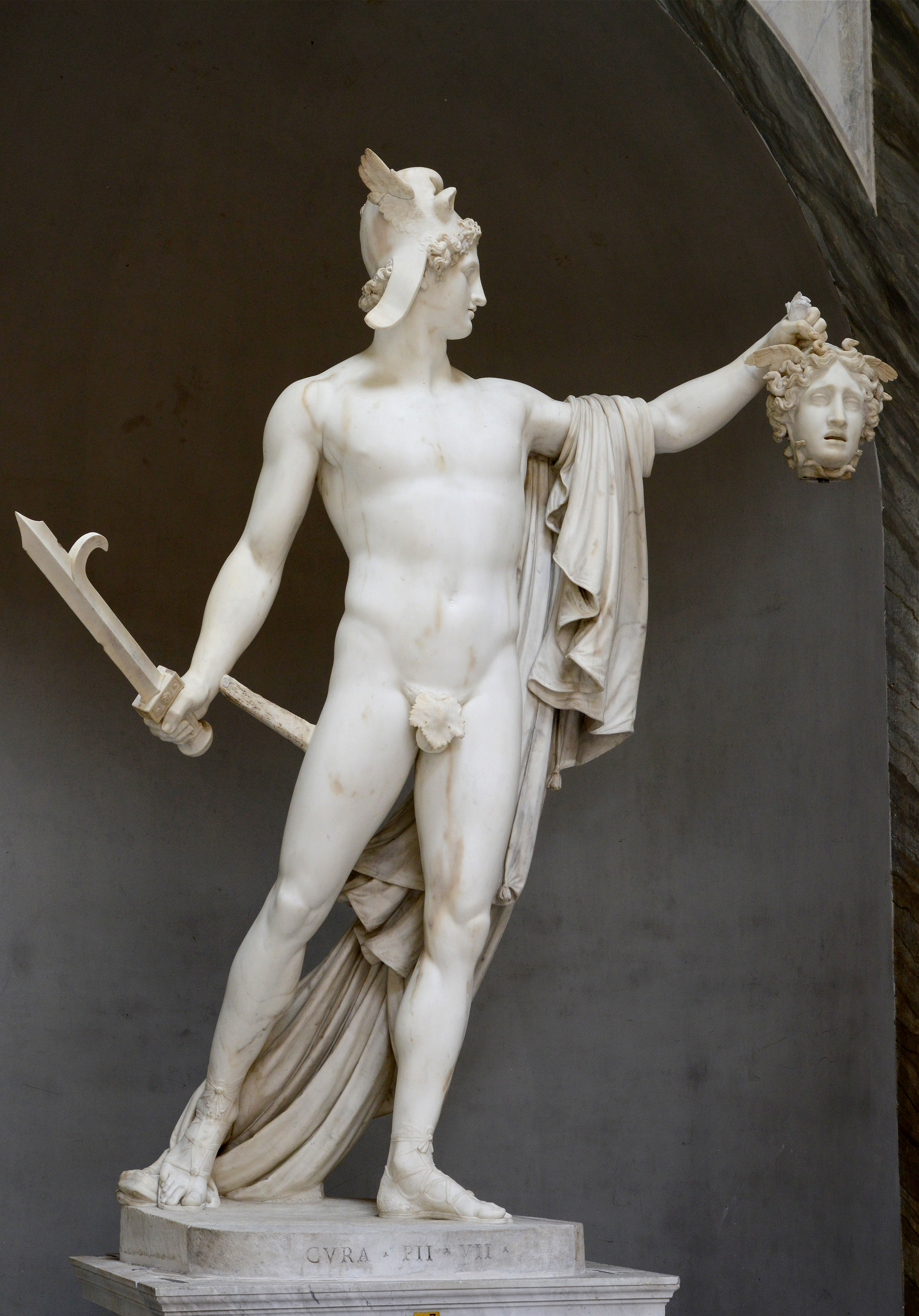
Statue of Perseus, Pius-Clemente Museum, Vatican.

In Greek mythology, the Perseids (sing. Perseid; (Note: Archaically Perseides or Perseïdes, sing. Perseide or Perseïde.) Ancient Greek: Περσείδαι, romanized: Perseídai, lit. 'those born of Perseus', sing. Περσείδης Perseídēs), (Note: Latin: Persidae or Perseidae, sing. Persides or Perseides.) also called the Perseid dynasty, the Perseid line, or the House of Perseus, are the descendants of Perseus and Andromeda.

After the Greek Dark Ages, tradition recalled that Perseus and his descendants the Perseids had ruled Tiryns in Mycenaean times, while the allied branch descended from Perseus' great-uncle Proetus ruled in Argos.

Perseus and Andromeda had seven sons: Perses, Alcaeus, Heleus, Mestor, Sthenelus, Electryon, and Cynurus; and two daughters: Gorgophone, and Autochthe. Perses was left in Aethiopia and was believed to have become an ancestor of the Persians. The other descendants ruled Mycenae from Electryon down to Eurystheus, after whom Atreus got the kingdom. The most renowned of the Perseids was the greatest Greek hero, Heracles son of Zeus and Alcmene, daughter of Electryon. Other famous Perseids include the Dioscuri sons of Tyndareus, Penelope daughter of Icarius, Clytemnestra daughter of Tyndareus, Iphigenia and Elektra daughters of Agamemnon and Clytemnestra, Orestes son of Agamemnon and Clytemnestra, and Telemachus son of Penelope and Odysseus.

== Sources ==
- Bigg, Charles (1868). The History of the War Between the Peloponnesians and Athenians by Thucydides.
- Blackwell, Thomas (1735). An Enquiry Into the Life and Writings of Homer. London.
- Christopoulos, George A. (1975). The Archaic Period. Ekdotike Athenon. ISBN 978-0-435-36601-8.
- Frazer, J. G. (1898). Pausanias's Description of Greece. Vol. III: Commentary on Books II–V. London.
- Gillies, John (1787). The History of Ancient Greece. Vol. 1. London.
- Gladstone, W. E. (1858). Studies on Homer and the Homeric age.
- Grote, George (1869). A History of Greece. Vol. 1. London.
- Guest, Edwin (1883). Origines Celticae. Vol. 1. London.
- Mitford, William (1814). The History of Greece. Vol. 8. London.
- Peter, Carl (1882). Chronological Tables of Greek History. Translated by Chawner, G. Cambridge.
- Reineccius, Reiner (1574). Syntagma de familiis (in Latin).
- Smith, William (1875). "Hēraclīdae". A Classical Dictionary of Biography, Mythology, and Geography. London.
- Vannicelli, Pietro (2012). "The Mythical Origins of the Medes and the Persians". Myth, Truth, and Narrative in Herodotus. doi:10.1093/acprof:oso/9780199693979.003.0011.
- Wallace, Florence Elizabeth (1927). Color in Homer and in Ancient Art: Preliminary Studies.
- Zekiou, Olga (2019). The Poetics of the Homeric Citadel.
