= Perseus =

Ancient Greek hero and founder of Mycenae

- King of Argos; Founder and king of Mycenae; Slayer of Medusa and Cetus
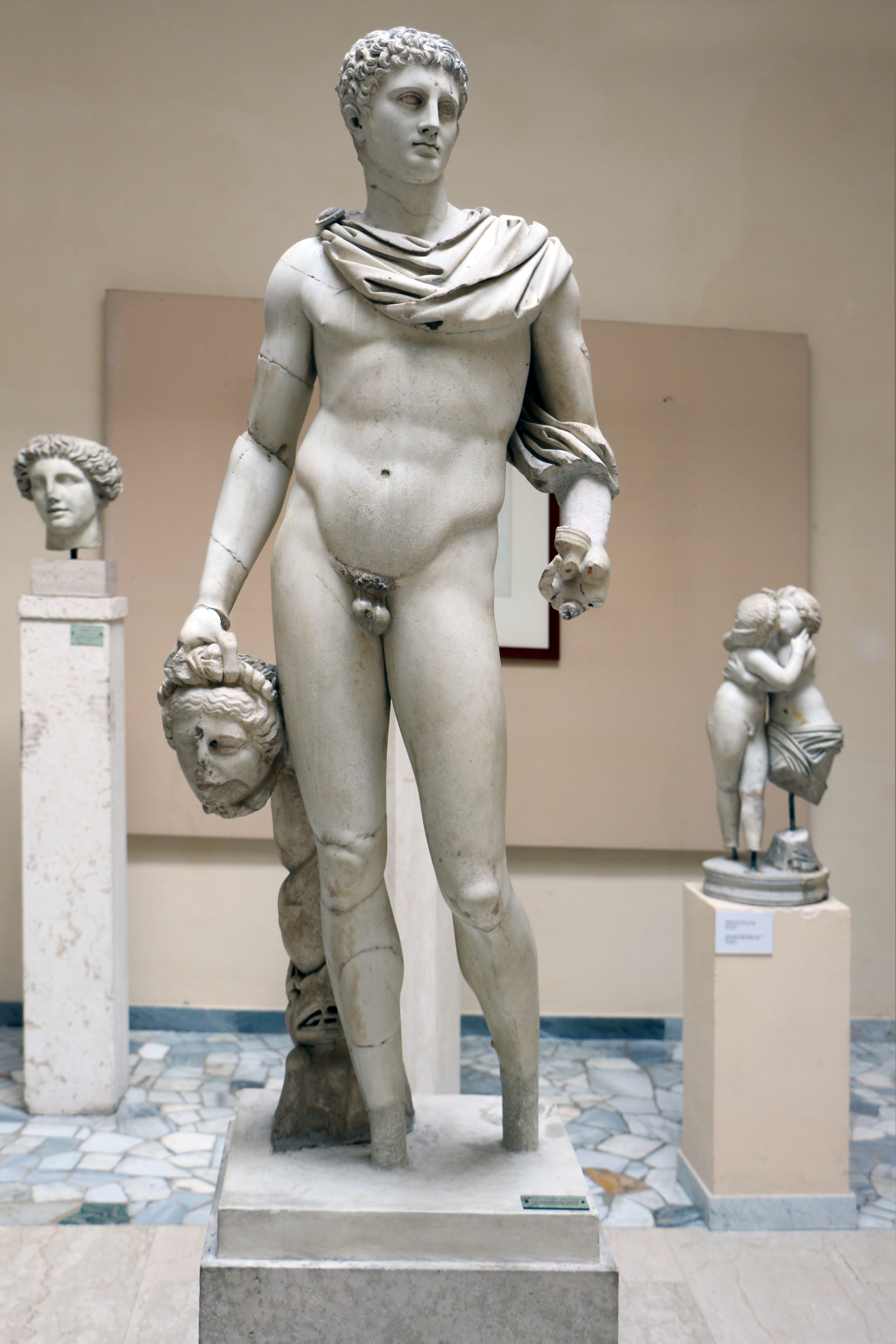
- Perseus with the head of Medusa, first century AD, Museo Ostiense
- Abode: Seriphus, then Argos
- Symbol: Medusa's head

Genealogy
- Parents: Zeus and Danaë
- Siblings: Several paternal half-siblings
- Consort: Andromeda
- Children: Perses, Heleus, Alcaeus, Sthenelus, Electryon, Mestor, Cynurus, Gorgophone, Autochthe

In Greek mythology, Perseus (/ˈpɜːr.si.əs/ PUR-see-əs, UK also /-ʃəs, -sjuːs/ -shəs, -sews; Ancient Greek: Περσεύς, romanized: Perseús) is the legendary founder of the Perseid dynasty. He was, alongside Cadmus and Bellerophon, the greatest Greek hero and slayer of monsters before the days of Heracles. He beheaded the Gorgon Medusa for Polydectes and saved Andromeda from the sea monster Cetus. He was a demigod, being the son of Zeus and the mortal Danaë, as well as the half-brother and great-grandfather of Heracles (as they were both children of Zeus, and Heracles's mother was Perseus's granddaughter).

== Etymology ==
Because of the obscurity of the name "Perseus" and the legendary character of its bearer, most etymologists think it might be pre-Greek; however, the name of Perseus's native city was Greek and so were the names of his wife and relatives. Greek may have inherited it from Proto-Indo-European. In that regard Graves proposed the only Greek derivation available: Perseus might be from Greek pérthein (πέρθειν) "to waste, ravage, sack, destroy", some form of which is familiar in Homeric epithets. Carl Darling Buck says the -eus suffix typically forms an agent noun, in this case from the aorist stem, pers-. Pers-eus is thus a "sacker [of cities]"; that is, a soldier by occupation, a fitting name for the first Mycenaean warrior.

The further origin of perth- is more obscure. Hofmann lists the possible root as *bher-, from which Latin ferio, "strike". This corresponds to Pokorny's *bher-(3), "scrape, cut". Normally *bh- becomes ph- in Greek. But pérth- could be dissimilated from earlier *phérth-, per Grassmann's law. Graves carries the meaning still further, to Perse- in Persephone, goddess of death. Ventris & Chadwick speculate about a Mycenaean goddess pe-re-*82 (Linear B: 𐀟𐀩𐁚), attested on tablet PY Tn 316, and tentatively reconstructed as *Preswa.

A Greek folk etymology connected Perseus to the name of the Persians, whom they called the Pérsai (from Old Persian Pārsa "Persia, a Persian"). However, the native name of the Persians – Pārsa in Persian – has always been pronounced with an -a-. Herodotus recounts this story, devising a foreign son of Andromeda and Perseus, Perses, from whom the Persians took the name. Apparently the Persians also knew that story, as Xerxes tried to use it to suborn the Argives during his invasion of Greece, but ultimately failed to do so.

== Mythology ==
=== Birth ===
King Acrisius of Argos had only one child, a daughter named Danaë. Disappointed by not having a male heir, Acrisius consulted the Oracle at Delphi, who warned him that he would one day be killed by his own grandson. To keep Danaë childless, Acrisius imprisoned her in a room atop a bronze tower in the courtyard of his palace: (Note: "Even thus endured Danaë in her beauty to change the light of day for brass-bound walls; and in that chamber, secret as the grave, she was held close". In post-Renaissance paintings the setting is often a locked tower.) Zeus came to her in the form of a shower of gold, and fathered her child. Hence, Perseus is also called Chrysopatros (χρυσόπατρος, "gold-fathered"). Soon after, their child, a son, was born; Perseus. "Perseus Eurymedon, (Note: Eurymedon: "far-ruling") for his mother gave him this name as well".

Fearful for his future, but unwilling to provoke the wrath of the gods and the Erinyes by killing the offspring of Zeus and his daughter, Acrisius cast the two into the sea in a wooden chest. Danaë's fearful prayer, made while afloat in the darkness, has been expressed by the poet Simonides of Ceos. The mother and child were washed ashore on the island of Seriphos, where they were taken in by the fisherman Dictys, who raised the boy to manhood. The brother of Dictys was Polydectes, the king of the island.

=== Feud with Polydectes ===
When Perseus was growing up on the island of Seriphus, Polydectes came to lust for the beautiful Danaë. Perseus believed Polydectes was less than honorable, and protected his mother from him once he reached maturity; then Polydectes plotted to send Perseus away in disgrace. He held a type of large banquet where each guest was expected to bring a gift, under the pretense that he was collecting contributions for the hand of Hippodamia, daughter of Oenomaus. (Note: Such a banquet, to which each guest brings a gift, was an eranos. The name of Polydectes, "receiver of many", characterizes his role as intended host but is also a euphemism for the Lord of the Underworld, as in "Hymn to Demeter". Homeric Hymns. 9, 17.)

Polydectes asked what sort of gift his subjects thought was suitable to give him, and while others answered 'horse', Perseus named the head of the snake-haired Medusa; alternatively Perseus promised to bring him any gift, even something as difficult to obtain as Medusa's head. When everyone, Perseus included, arrived with gift horses Polydectes rejected Perseus' horse and told Perseus to do good on his promise and fetch him the gorgon's head.

=== Overcoming Medusa ===
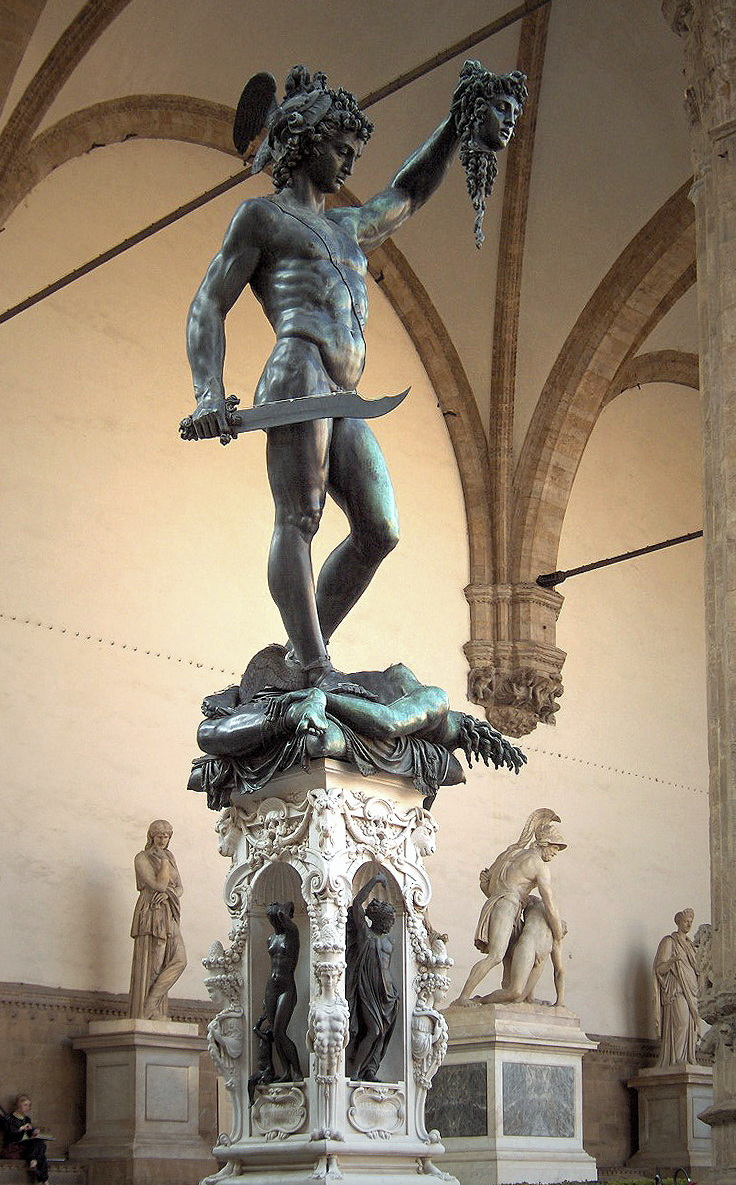
Perseus with the Head of Medusa, Benvenuto Cellini, Loggia dei Lanzi, Florence

Medusa and her two immortal elder sisters, Stheno and Euryale, were Gorgons, monsters with snakes for hair, sharp fangs and claws, wings of gold, and gazes that turned people to stone.

Before setting out on his quest, Perseus prayed to the gods, and Zeus answered by sending two of his other children – Hermes and Athena – to bless their half-brother with the weapons needed to defeat Medusa. Hermes gave Perseus his own pair of winged sandals to fly with and lent him his harpe sword to slay Medusa with, and Hades's helm of darkness to become invisible with. Athena lent Perseus her polished shield for him to view Medusa's reflection without becoming petrified, and gave him a kibisis, a knapsack to safely contain the Gorgon's head which the goddess warned could still petrify even in death. Lastly, Athena instructed Perseus to seek out the Graeae, the Gorgons' sisters, for the snake-haired women's whereabouts (in other versions, nymphs who gave Perseus the weapons after he sought out the Graeae).

Following Athena's guidance, Perseus found the Graeae, who were three old witches that shared a single eye and a single tooth. As the witches passed their eye from one to another, Perseus snatched it from them, holding it for ransom in return for the Gorgons' location. The Graeae informed Perseus that the Gorgons lived on the Island of Sarpedon. Perseus then gave the Graeae their eye back and proceeded to the island.

On the Island of Sarpedon, Perseus came across a cave where Stheno, Euryale, and Medusa lay sleeping. Using Athena's reflective shield, Perseus overcame the looking taboo by looking at her reflection on the shield to guide himself. He then walked into the cave backwards, safely observing and approaching the sleeping Gorgons. With Athena guiding the sword, Perseus beheaded Medusa. From Medusa's neck sprang her two children with Poseidon: the winged horse Pegasus ("he who sprang") and the giant Chrysaor ("sword of gold"). To avenge their sister's death, Stheno and Euryale flew after Perseus, but he escaped them by wearing Hades's invisibility helm. From here he proceeded to visit King Atlas of Mauretania, who had refused him hospitality; in revenge Perseus petrified him with Medusa's head and King Atlas became the Atlas mountains.

=== Marriage to Andromeda ===
On the way back to Seriphos, Perseus stopped in the kingdom of Aethiopia. This mythical Ethiopia was ruled by King Cepheus and Queen Cassiopeia. Cassiopeia, having boasted that her daughter Andromeda was more beautiful than the Nereids, drew the vengeance of Poseidon, who sent an inundation on the land and a sea serpent, Cetus, which destroyed man and beast. The oracle of Ammon announced that no relief would be found until the king sacrificed his daughter, Andromeda, to the monster, and so she was fastened to a rock on the shore. Wearing the winged sandals given to him by Hermes, Perseus reached Andromeda and used the harpe to behead the monster (in other versions, Perseus used Medusa's head to petrify Cetus). By rescuing Andromeda, Perseus claimed her in marriage.

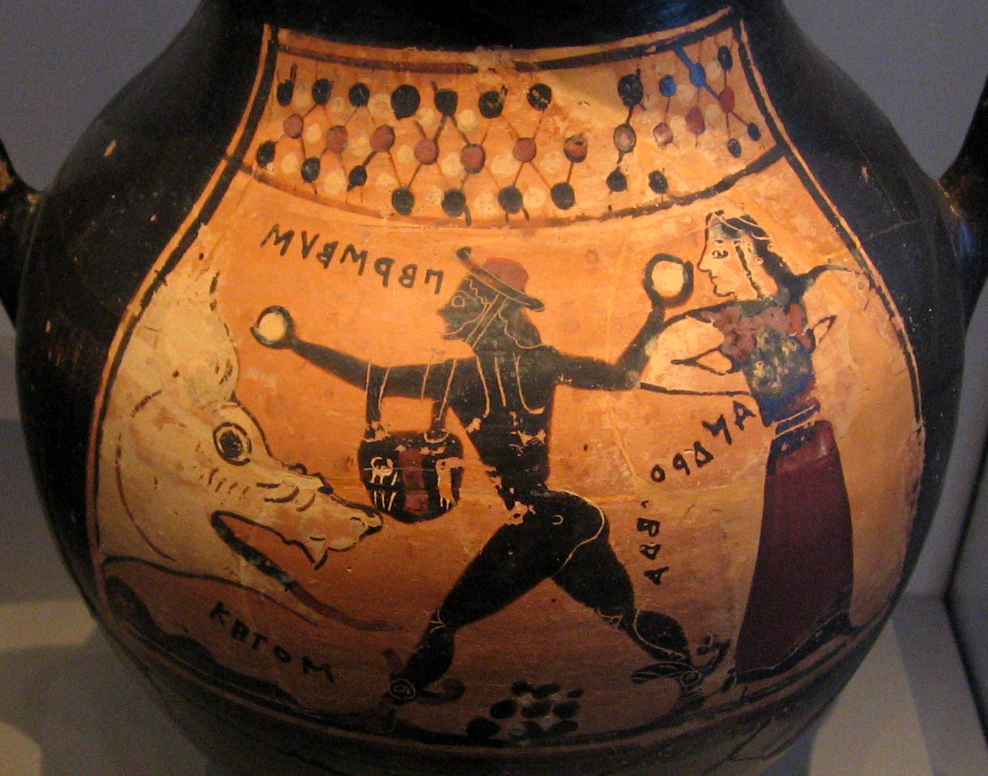
Perseus rescuing Andromeda from Cetus, depicted on an amphora in the Altes Museum, Berlin

Perseus married Andromeda in spite of Phineus, to whom she had been previously engaged. At the wedding, a quarrel took place between the rivals, and Phineus was petrified by the sight of Medusa's head. Andromeda ("queen of men") followed her husband to Tiryns in Argos, and became the ancestress of the family of the Perseidae who ruled at Tiryns through her son with Perseus, Perses. (Note: Perseus and Andromeda descendants (the Perseids) include seven sons: Perses, Alcaeus, Heleus, Mestor, Sthenelus, Electryon, and Cynurus, and one daughter, Gorgophone. Their descendants also ruled Mycenae, from Electryon to Eurystheus, after whom Atreus attained the kingdom. Among the Perseids was the great hero Heracles. According to this mythology, Perseus is the ancestor of the Persians.) After her death, she was placed by Athena among the constellations in the northern sky, near Perseus and Cassiopeia. (Note: See article Catasterismi.) Sophocles and Euripides (and in more modern times Pierre Corneille) made the episode of Perseus and Andromeda the subject of tragedies, and its incidents were represented in many ancient works of art.

As Perseus was flying in his return above the sands of Libya, according to Apollonius of Rhodes, the falling drops of Medusa's blood created a race of toxic serpents, one of which was to kill the Argonaut Mopsus. Upon returning to Seriphos and discovering that his mother had to take refuge from the violent advances of Polydectes, Perseus killed him with Medusa's head, and made Dictys the new king of Seriphos.

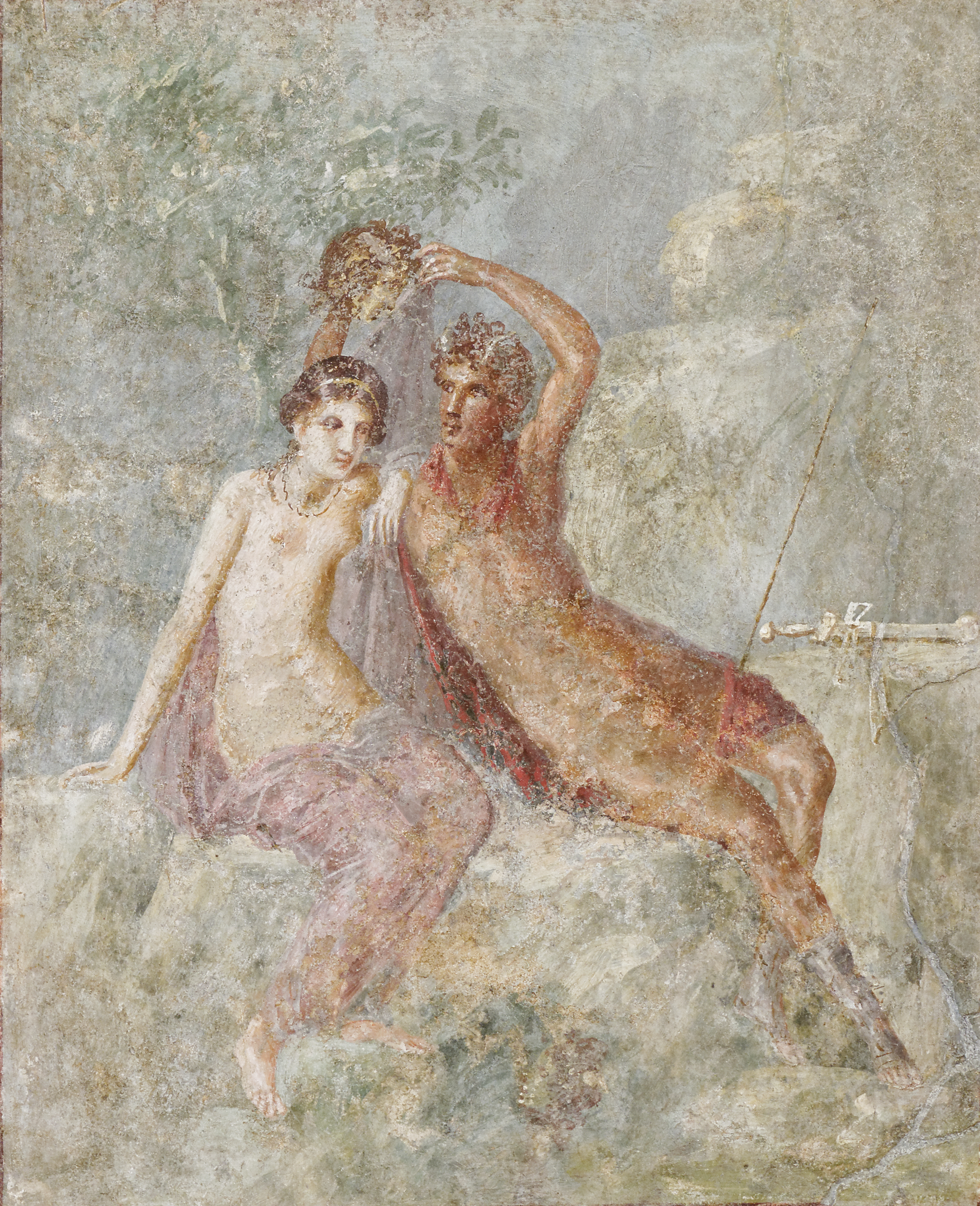
Perseus and Andromeda, 1st century AD fresco from the Casa della Saffo, Pompeii; he shows her the Medusa's head reflected in a pool.

=== Prophecy fulfilled ===
Perseus then returned his magical loans and gave Medusa's head as a votive gift to Athena, who set it on her aegis (which Zeus gave her) as the Gorgoneion. The fulfillment of the oracle was told several ways, each incorporating the mythic theme of exile. In Pausanias he did not return to Argos, but went instead to Larissa, where athletic games were being held. He had just invented the quoit and was making a public display of them when Acrisius, who happened to be visiting, stepped into the trajectory of the quoit and was killed: thus the oracle was fulfilled. This is an unusual variant on the story of such a prophecy, as Acrisius's actions on hearing the oracle did not, in this variant, cause his death.

In the Bibliotheca, the inevitable occurred by another route: Perseus did return to Argos, but when Acrisius learned of his grandson's approach, mindful of the oracle he went into voluntary exile in Pelasgiotis (Thessaly). There Teutamides, king of Larissa, was holding funeral games for his father. Competing in the discus throw, Perseus's throw veered-and struck Acrisius, killing him instantly. In a third tradition, Acrisius had been driven into exile by his brother Proetus. Perseus petrified the brother with Medusa's head and restored Acrisius to the throne. Then, accused by Acrisius of lying about having slain Medusa, Perseus proves himself by showing Acrisius the Gorgon's head, thus fulfilling the prophecy.

Having killed Acrisius, Perseus, who was next in line for the throne, gave the kingdom to Megapenthes ("great mourning"), son of Proetus, and took over Megapenthes's kingdom of Tiryns. The story is related in Pausanias, who gives as motivation for the swap that Perseus was ashamed to have become king of Argos by inflicting death. In any case, early Greek literature reiterates that manslaughter, even involuntary, requires the exile of the slaughterer, expiation and ritual purification. The exchange might well have proved a creative solution to a difficult problem.

=== King of Mycenae ===
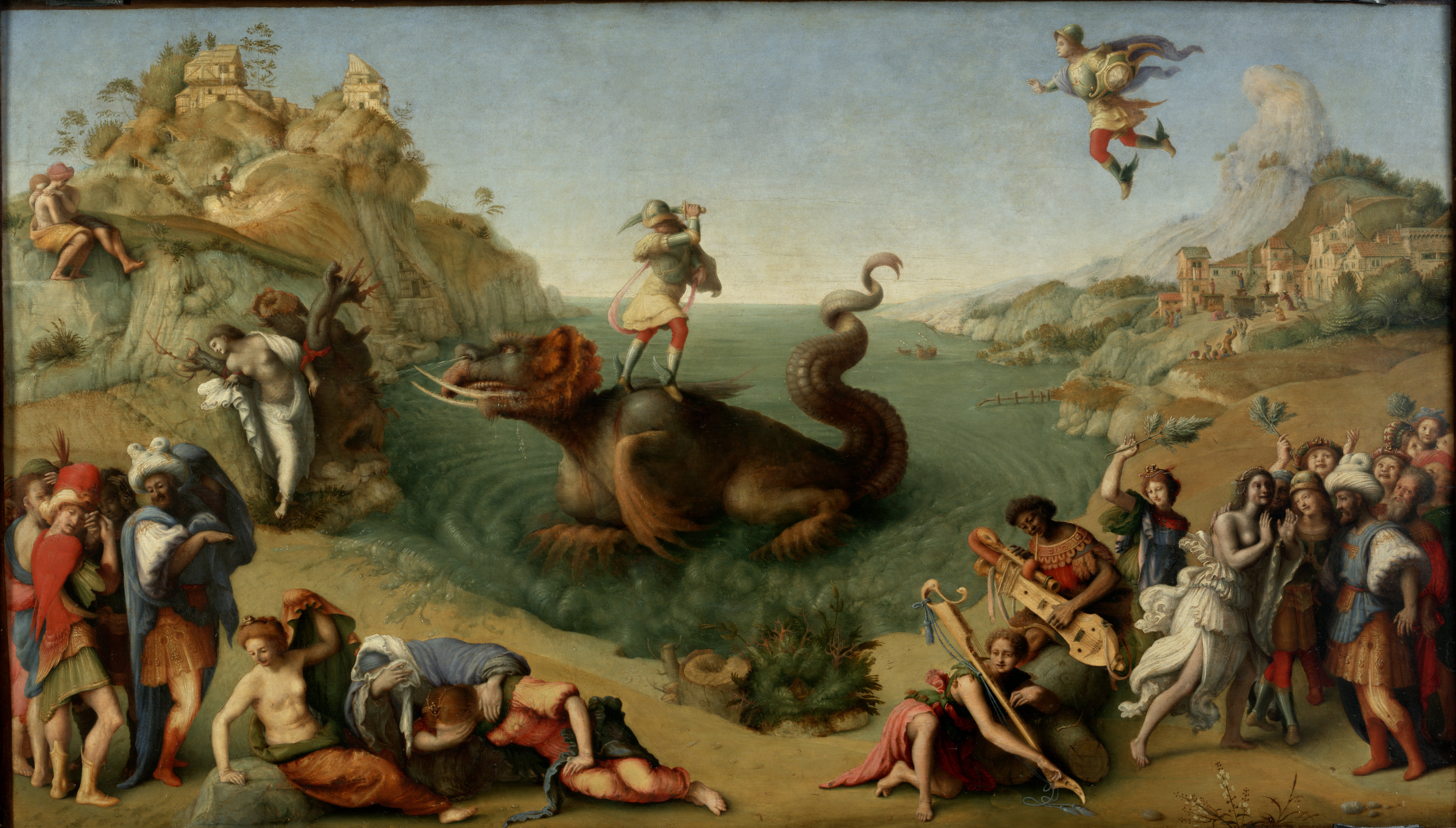
Perseus Freeing Andromeda by Piero di Cosimo (c. 1515) – Uffizi

The two main sources regarding the legendary life of Perseus—for the Greeks considered him an authentic historical figure—are Pausanias and the Bibliotheca. Pausanias asserts that the Greeks believed Perseus founded Mycenae as his capital. He mentions the shrine to Perseus that stood on the left-hand side of the road from Mycenae to Argos, and also a sacred fountain at Mycenae called Persea. Located outside the walls, this was perhaps the spring that filled the citadel's underground cistern. He states also that Atreus stored his treasures in an underground chamber there, which is why Heinrich Schliemann named the largest tholos tomb the Treasury of Atreus.

Apart from these more historical references, the only accounts of him are from folk-etymology: Perseus dropped his cap or found a mushroom (both named myces) at Mycenae, or perhaps the place was named after the lady Mycene, daughter of Inachus, mentioned in a now-fragmentary poem, the Megalai Ehoiai. For whatever reasons, perhaps as outposts, Perseus fortified Mycenae according to Apollodorus along with Midea, an action that implies that both towns existed previously. It is unlikely, however, that Apollodorus knew who walled in Mycenae; he was only conjecturing. Perseus took up official residence in Mycenae with Andromeda where he had a long, successful reign as king.

=== Suda ===
According to the Suda, Perseus, after he married Andromeda, founded a city and called it Amandra (Ἄμανδραν). In the city there was a stele depicting the Gorgon. The city later changed the name to Ikonion because it had the depiction (ἀπεικόνισμα) of the Gorgon. Then he fought the Isaurians and the Cilicians and founded the city of Tarsus because an oracle told him to found a city in the place where after the victory, the flat (ταρσός) of his foot will touch the earth while he is dismounting from his horse. Then he conquered the Medes and changed the name of the country to Persia. At Persia, he taught the magi about the Gorgon and, when a fireball fell from the sky, he took the fire and gave it to the people to guard and revere it. Later, during a war, he tried to use Medusa's head again, but because he was old and could not see well, the head did not work. Because he thought that it was useless, he turned it toward himself and he died. Later his son Merros (Μέρρος) burned the head.

Regnal titles
Preceded by Acrisius	King of Argos	Succeeded by Megapenthes
Preceded by Megapenthes	King of Tiryns	Succeeded by Electryon
Preceded by none (founder)	King of Mycenae	Succeeded by Electryon

== Descendants ==
Perseus and Andromeda had seven sons: Perses, Alcaeus, Heleus, Mestor, Sthenelus, Electryon, and Cynurus, and two daughters, Gorgophone and Autochthe. Perses was left in Aethiopia and was believed to have been an ancestor of the Persians. The other descendants ruled Mycenae from Electryon to Eurystheus, after whom Atreus got the kingdom. However, the Perseids included the great hero, Heracles, stepson of Amphitryon, son of Alcaeus. The Heraclides, or descendants of Heracles, successfully contested the rule of the Atreids.

A statement by the Athenian orator Isocrates helps to date Perseus approximately. He said that Heracles was four generations later than Perseus, which corresponds to the legendary succession: Perseus, Electryon, Alcmena, and Heracles, who was a contemporary of Eurystheus. Atreus was one generation later, a total of five generations.

Descendants of Perseus and Andromeda Before the Time of Heracles to the Aftermath of the Trojan War
Children	Perses	Alcaeus	Sthenelus	Heleus	Mestor	Electryon	Cynurus	Gorgophone	Autochthe
Grandchildren	Achaemenid Persians	Amphitryon, Anaxo, Perimede	Eurystheus, Alcyone, Medusa	–	Hippothoe	Alcmene, Stratobates, Anactor, Gorgophonus, Phylonomus, Celaeneus, Amphimachus, Lysinomus, Archelaus, Chirimachus, Licymnius	–	Aphareus, Leucippus, Tyndareus, Icarius	–
Third Generation Descendants	–	Melas, Argius, Oeonus, Iphicles	Admete, Perimedes, Alexander, Iphimedon, Eurybius, Mentor	–	Taphius	Heracles, Iphicles, Oeonus, Melas, Argius,	–	Idas, Lynceus, Peisus; Hilaeira; Castor and Pollux, Helen, Clytemnestra, Timandra, Phoebe, Philonoe; Penelope, Perileos, Thoas, Iphthime, Aletes, Imeusimus, Damasippus	–
Fourth Generation Descendants	–	Iolaus	–	–	Pterelaus	Heraclides, Iolaus		Mnesileus; Anogon; Cleopatra; Iphigenia, Electra, Orestes, Chrysothemis, Laodice, (Note: Laodice may be the daughter of Agamemnon mentioned by Homer, who is generally equated with Electra.) Aletes, Erigone, Helen; Ladocus; Telemachus, Poliporthes, Acusilaus, Italus	–
Fifth Generation Descendants	–	Leipephilene	–	–	Chromius, Tyrannus, Antiochus, Mestor, Chersidamas, Eueres, Comaetho	Leipephilene		Medon, Strophius; Tisamenus, Penthilus; Persepolis, Latinus, Poliporthes	–

== Gallery ==
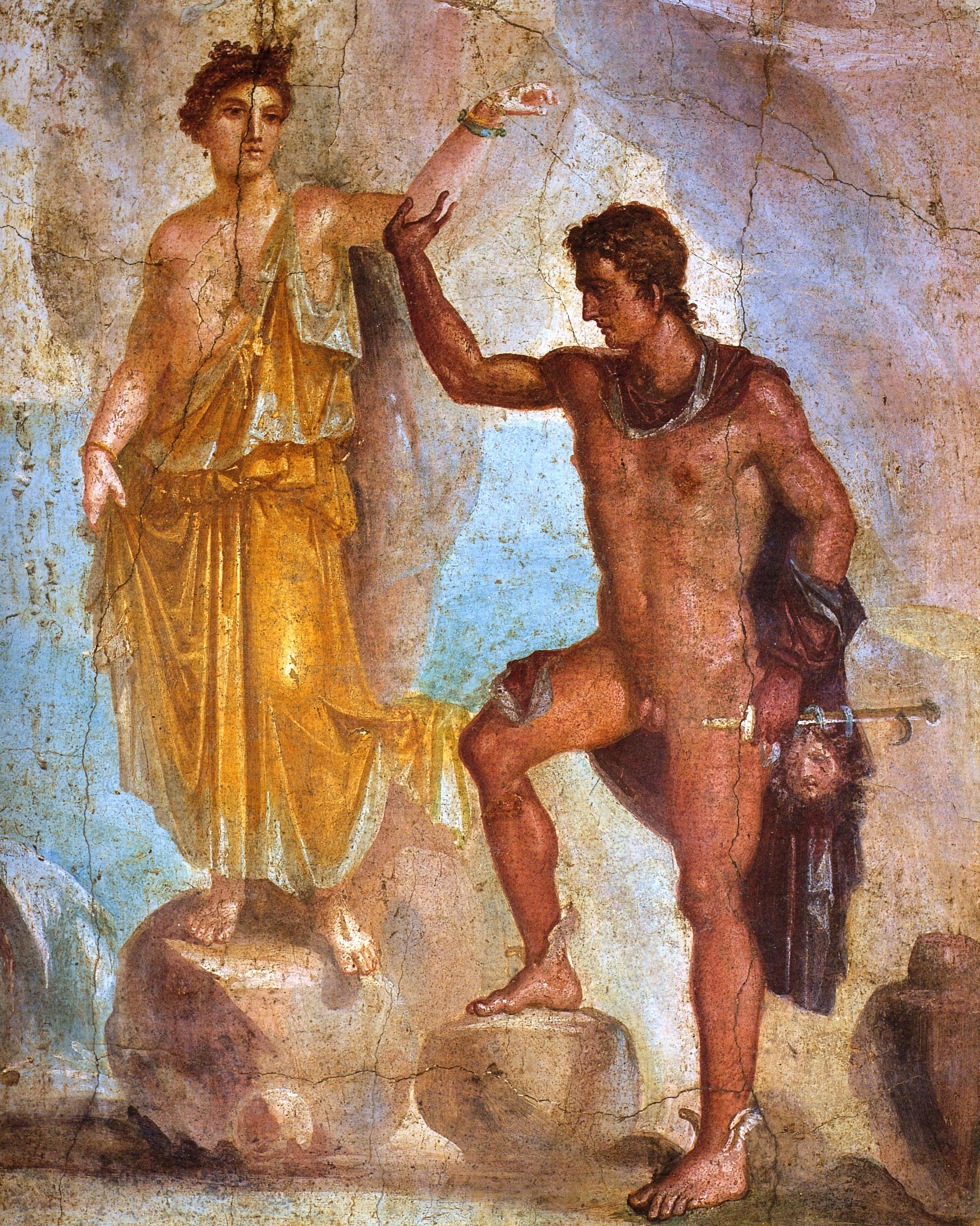
Perseus freeing Andromeda after killing Cetus, 1st century AD fresco from the Casa Dei Dioscuri, Pompeii

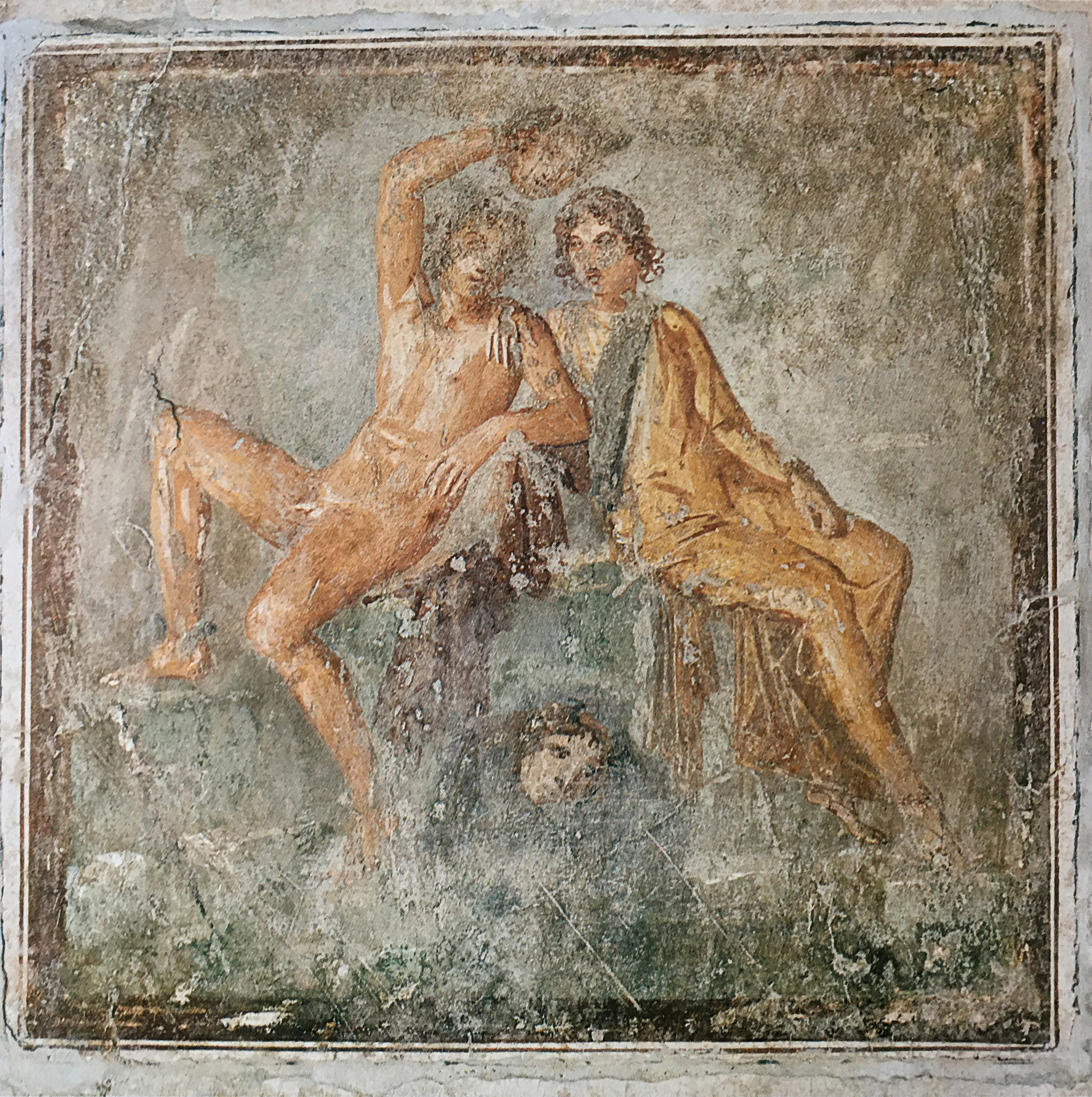
Perseus and Andromeda, 50 AD, fresco from the Casa del Principe di Napoli, Pompeii

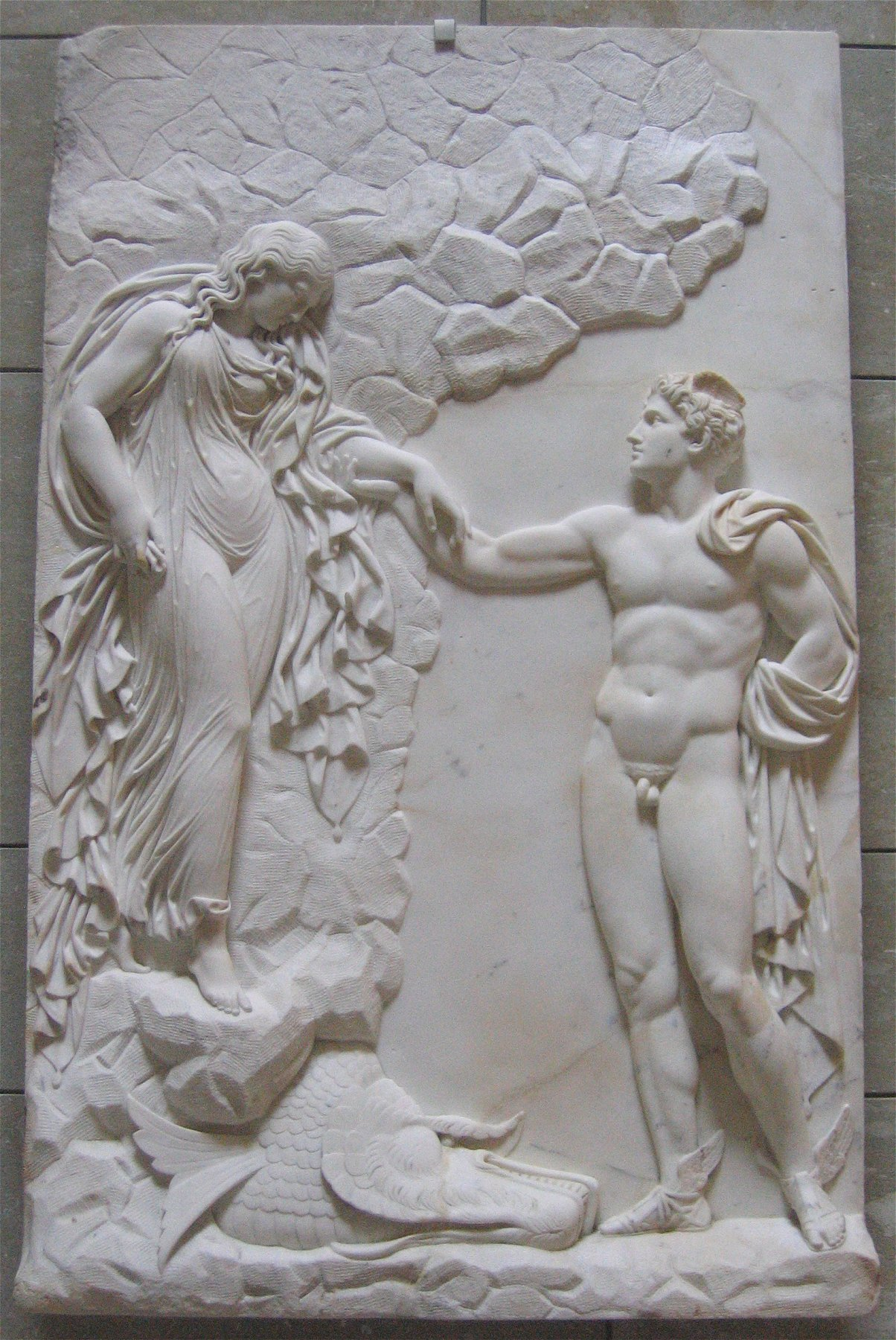
Julius Troschel: Perseus und Andromeda, c. 1845, Neue Pinakothek, Munich

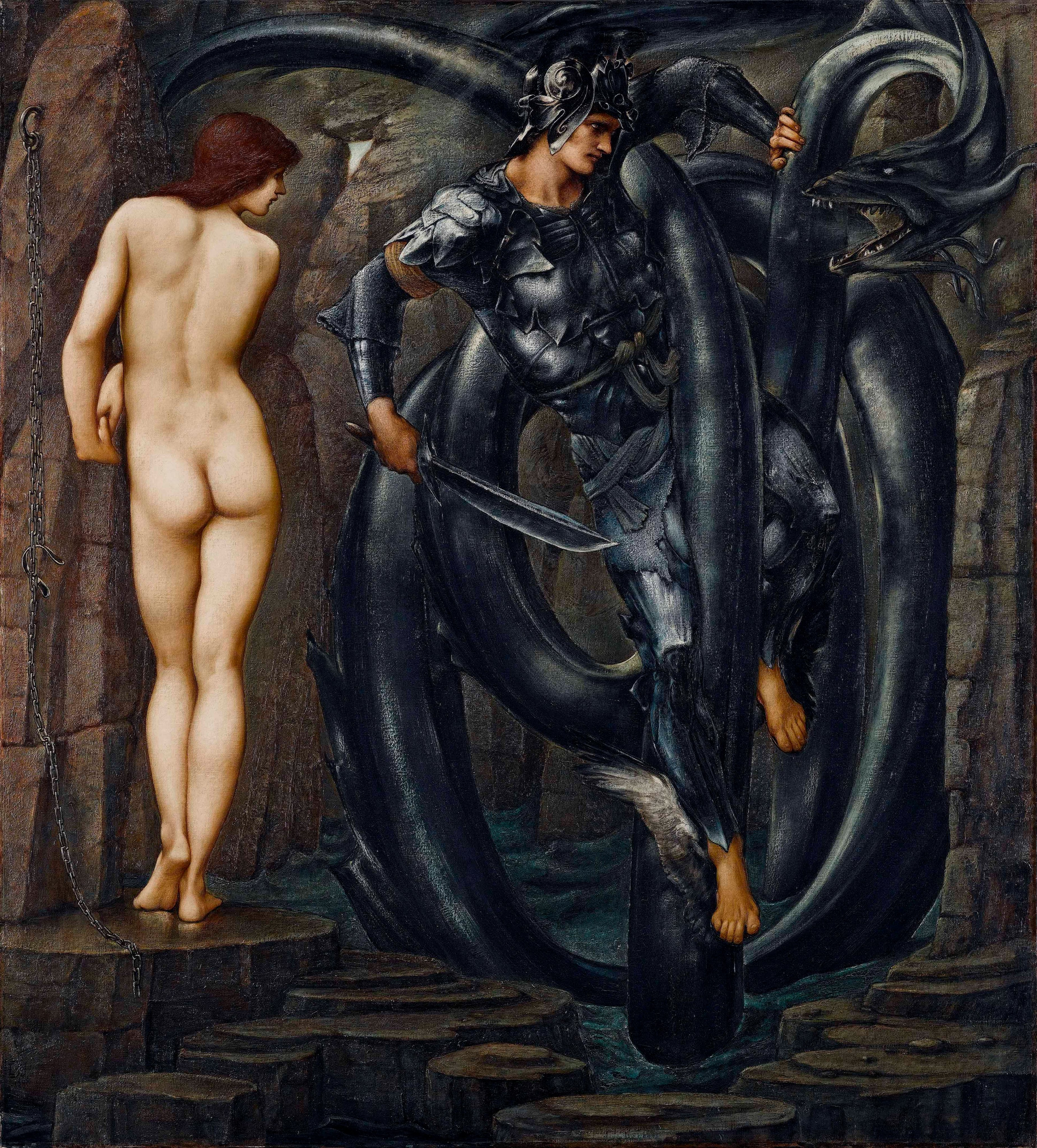
The Doom Fulfilled, 1888, Southampton City Art Gallery, from a series by Edward Burne-Jones

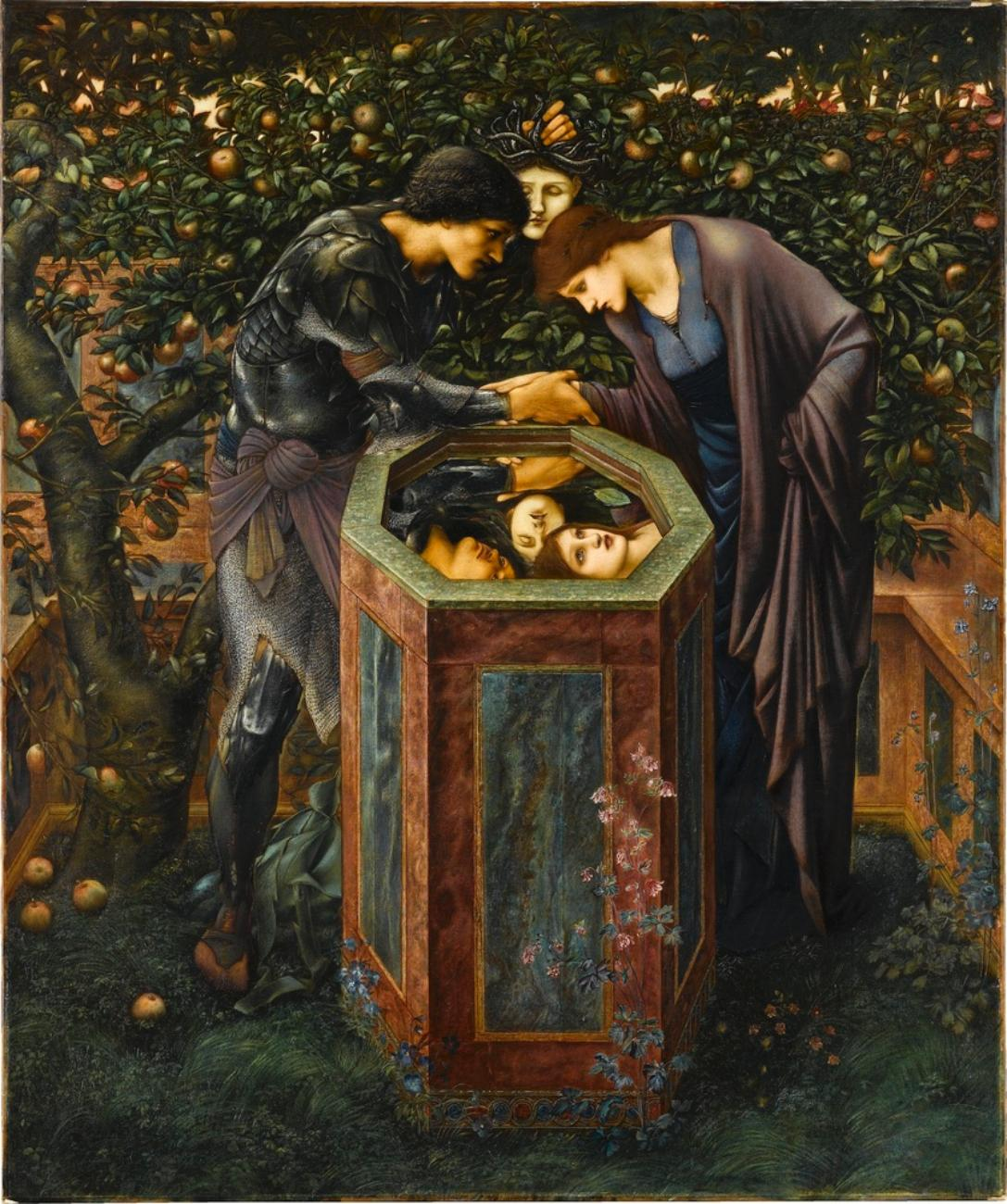
Edward Burne-Jones: The Baleful Head, 1885, Staatsgalerie Stuttgart. same series; Perseus has Andromeda look at the Gorgon's head, but only as reflected in the well.

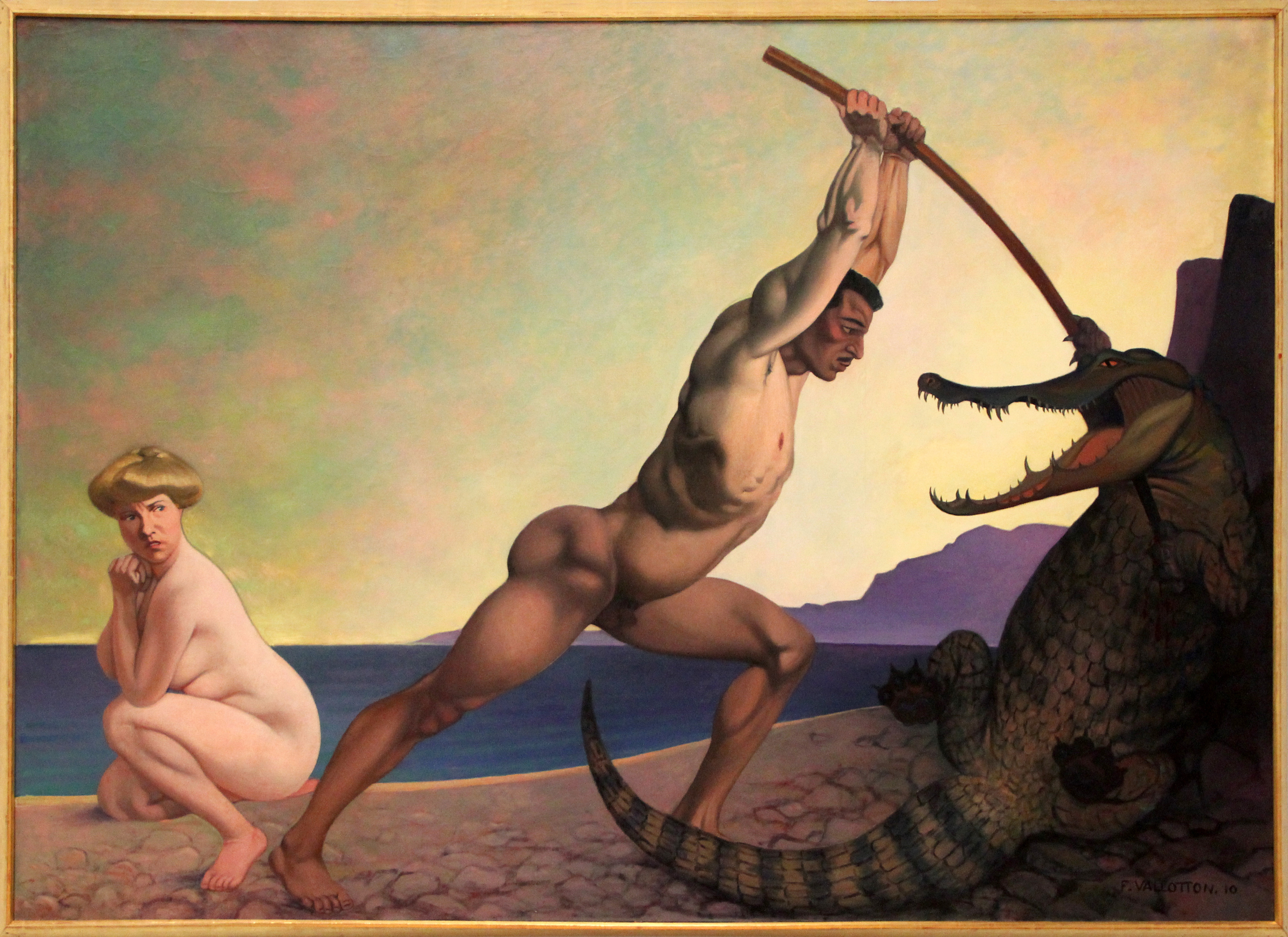
Félix Vallotton, Perseus Killing the Dragon, 1910, oils, Musée d'Art et d'Histoire (Geneva)

With Medusa

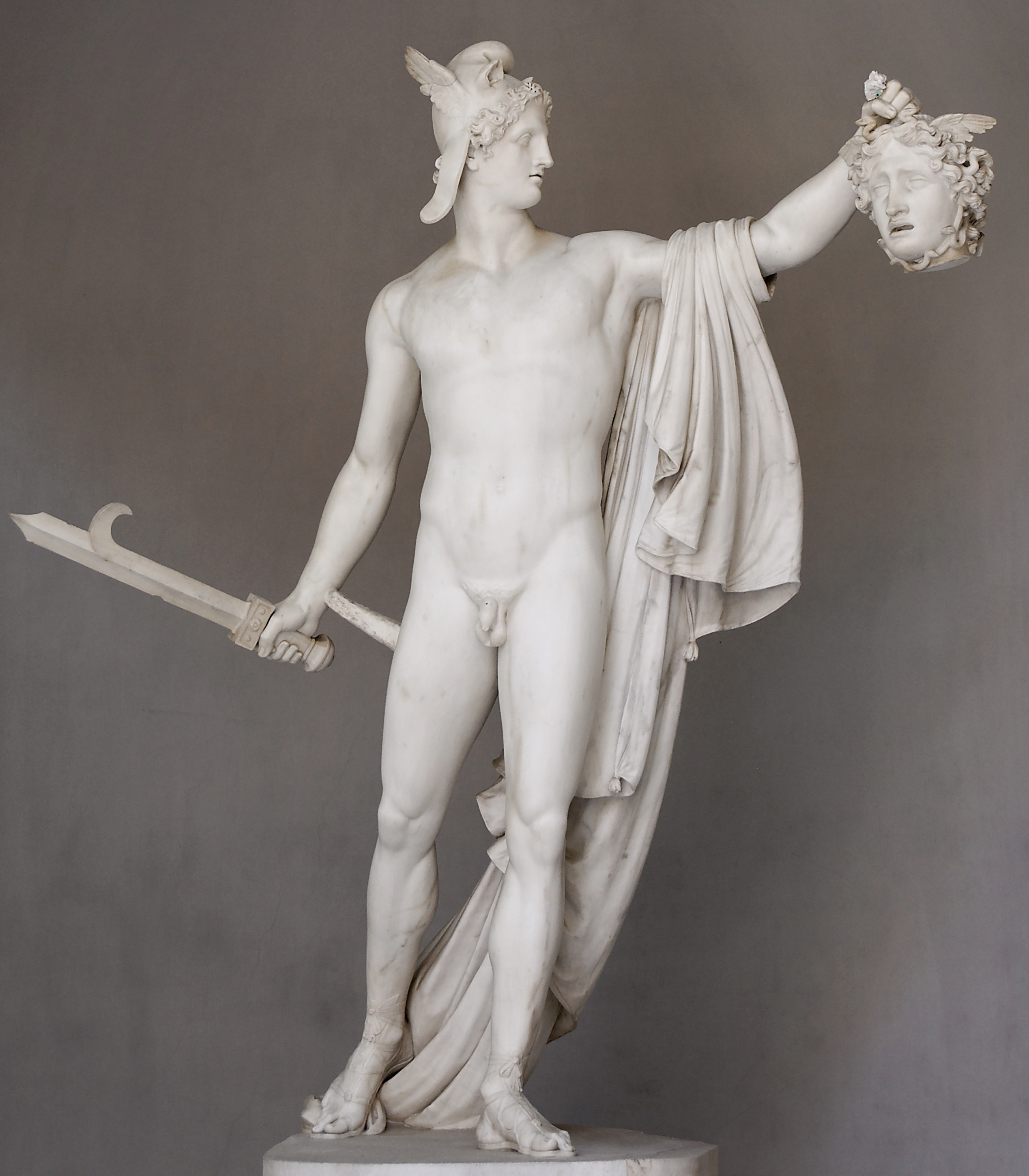
Marble sculpture by Antonio Canova (Vatican City), c. 1800

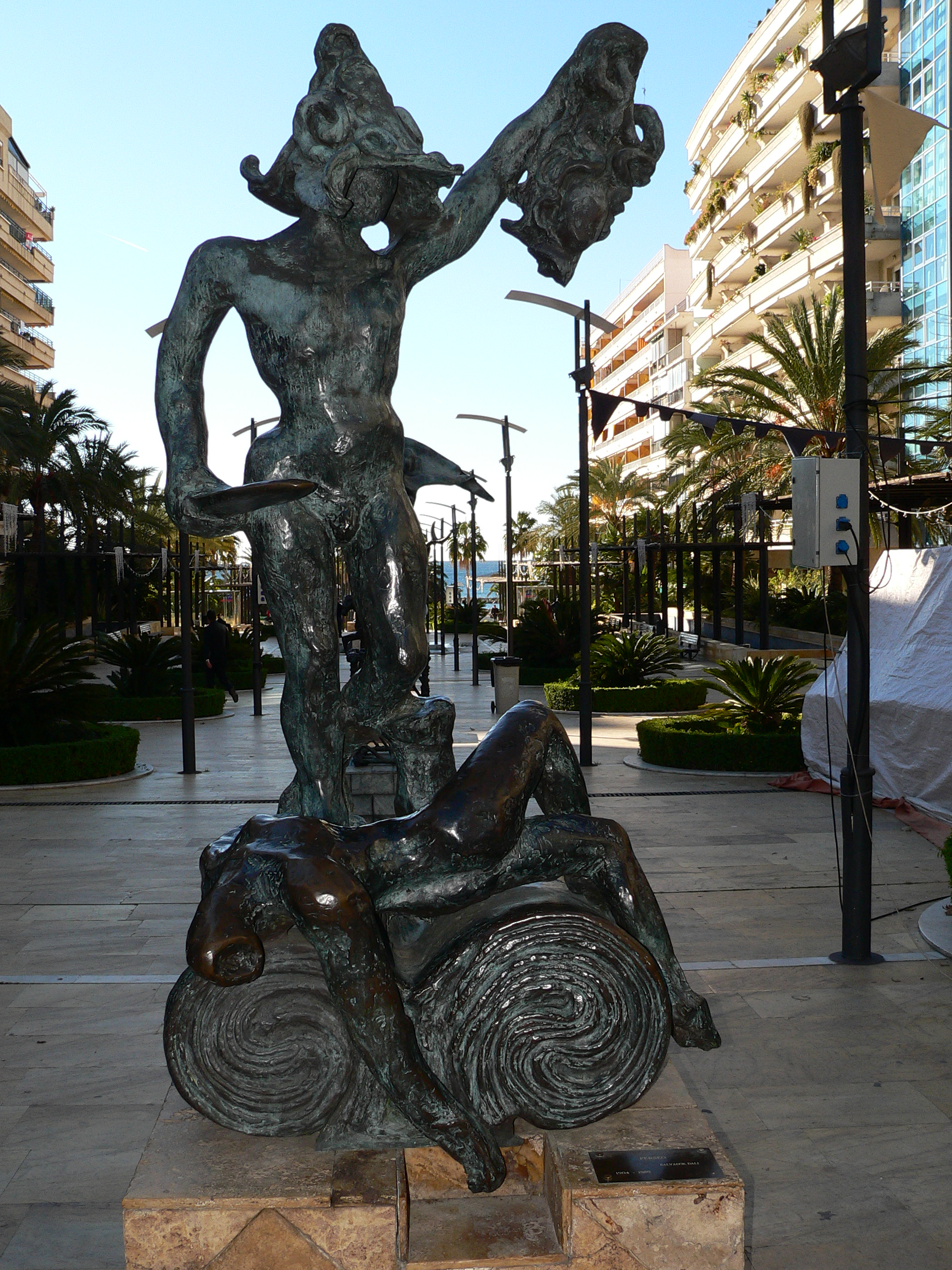
Sculpture by Salvador Dalí

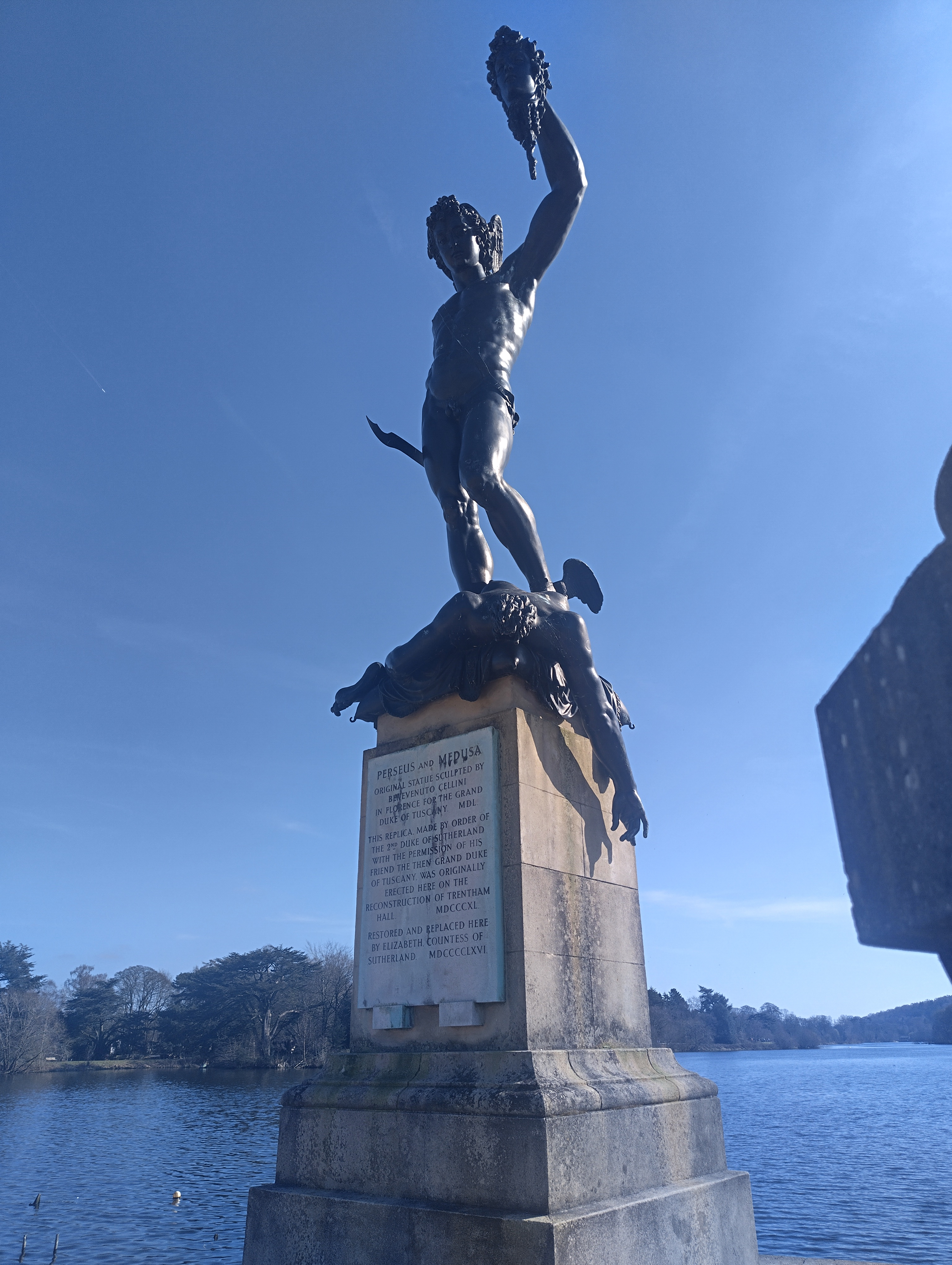
Produced by order of George Sutherland-Leveson-Gower, 2nd Duke of Sutherland in 1840. Erected in Trentham Estate.

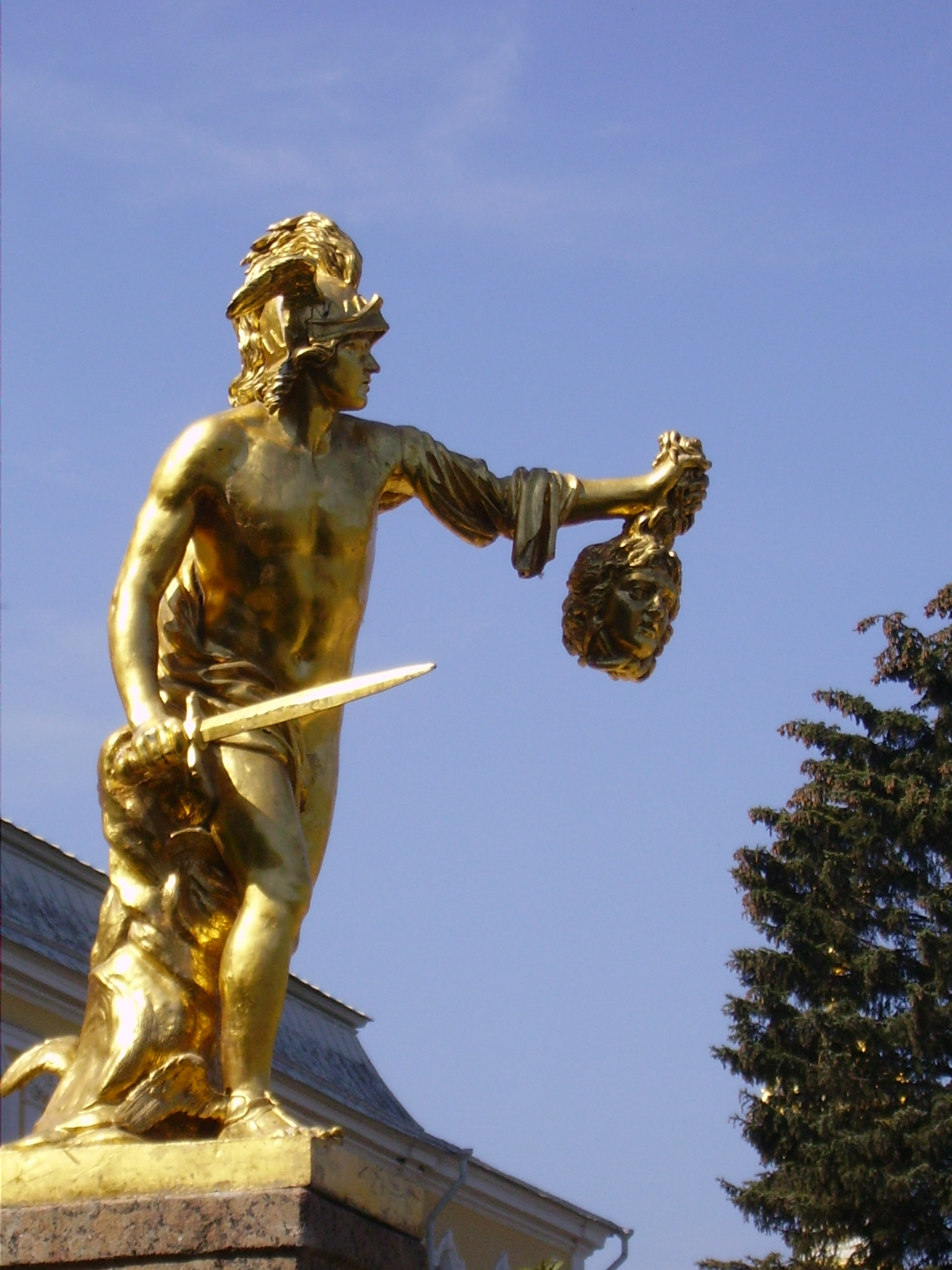
Sculpture by Feodosy Fedorovich Shchedrin

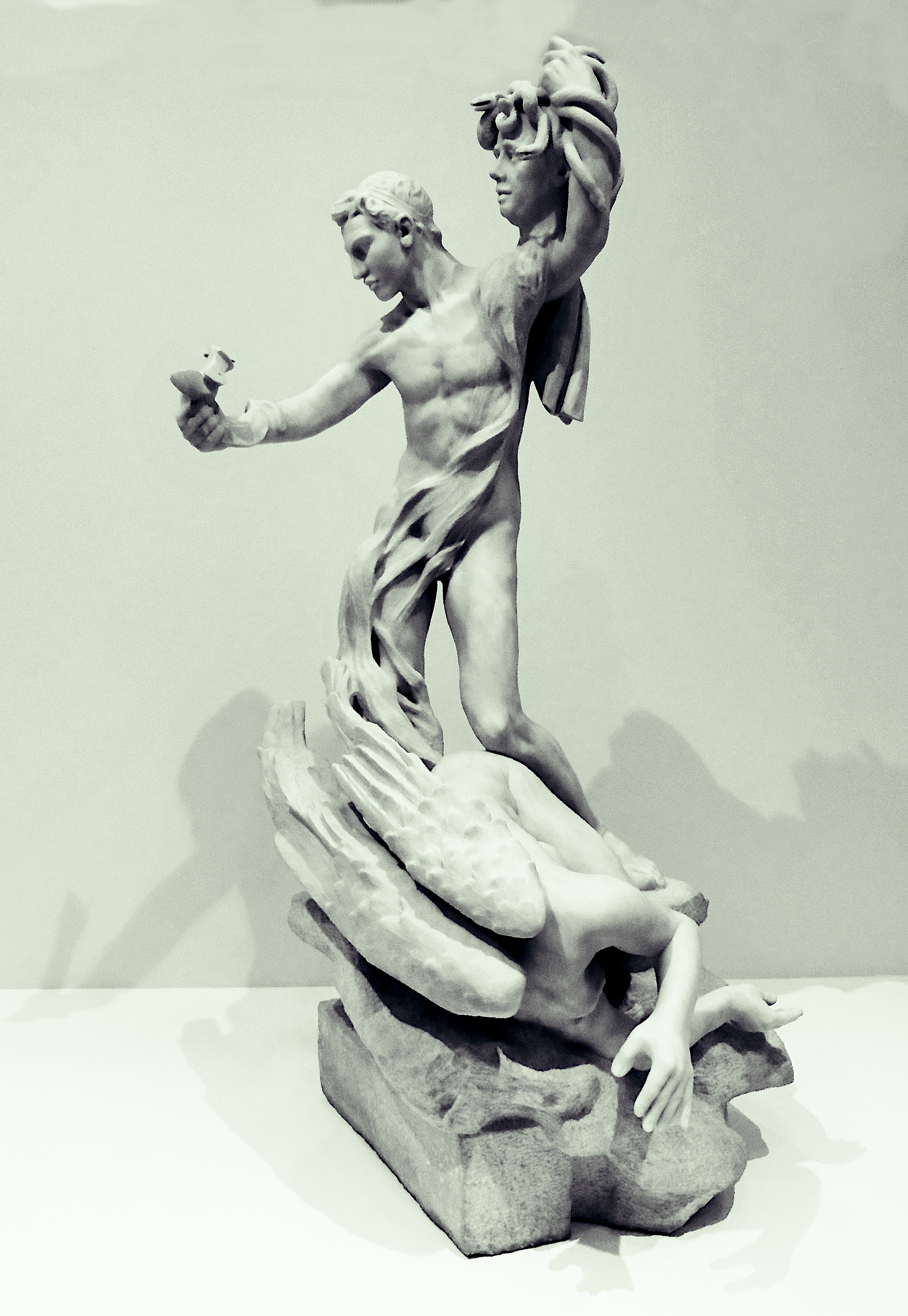
Perseus and the Gorgon, Camille Claudel, 1905

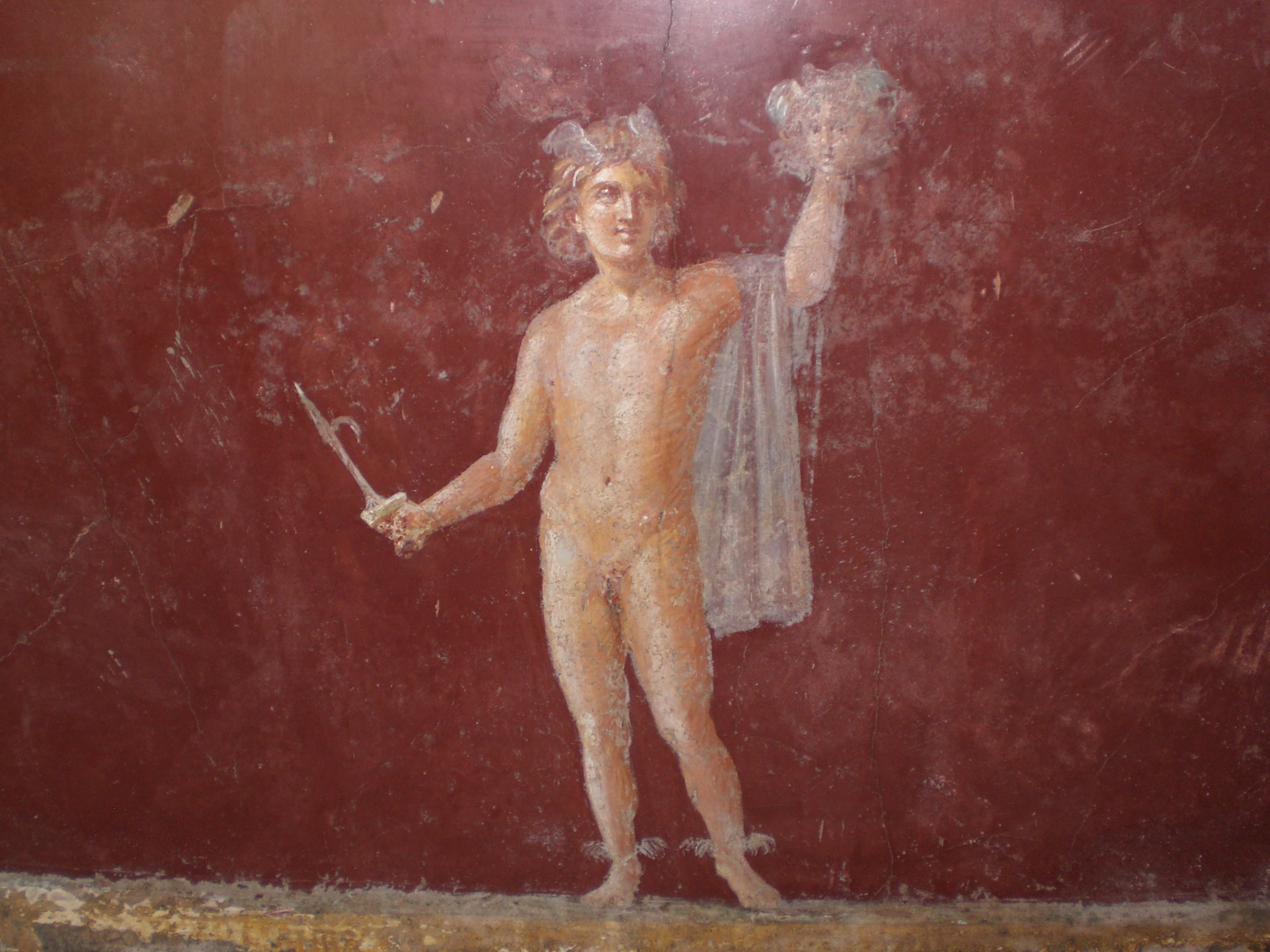
Roman fresco, Villa San Marco, Stabiae

== On Pegasus ==
The replacement of Bellerophon as the tamer and rider of Pegasus by the more familiar culture hero Perseus was not simply an error of painters and poets of the Renaissance. The transition was a development of Classical times which became the standard image during the Middle Ages and has been adopted by the European poets of the Renaissance and later: Giovanni Boccaccio's Genealogia deorum gentilium libri (10.27) identifies Pegasus as the steed of Perseus, and Pierre Corneille places Perseus upon Pegasus in Andromède. Various modern representations of Pegasus depict the winged horse with Perseus, including the fantasy film Clash of the Titans and its 2010 remake.

== Argive genealogy in Greek mythology ==
Argive genealogy in Greek mythology

Oceanus	Tethys
Inachus	Melia
Zeus	Io	Phoroneus
Epaphus	Memphis
Libya	Poseidon
Achiroë	Belus	Agenor	Telephassa
Danaus	Elephantis	Aegyptus	Cadmus	Cilix	Europa	Phoenix
Mantineus	Hypermnestra	Lynceus	Harmonia	Zeus
Sparta	Lacedaemon	Ocalea	Abas	Polydorus	Agave	Sarpedon	Rhadamanthus
Eurydice	Acrisius	Autonoë	Ino	Minos
Zeus	Danaë	Semele	Zeus
Perseus	Dionysus

Colour key:

Male
Female
Deity

== Constellation ==
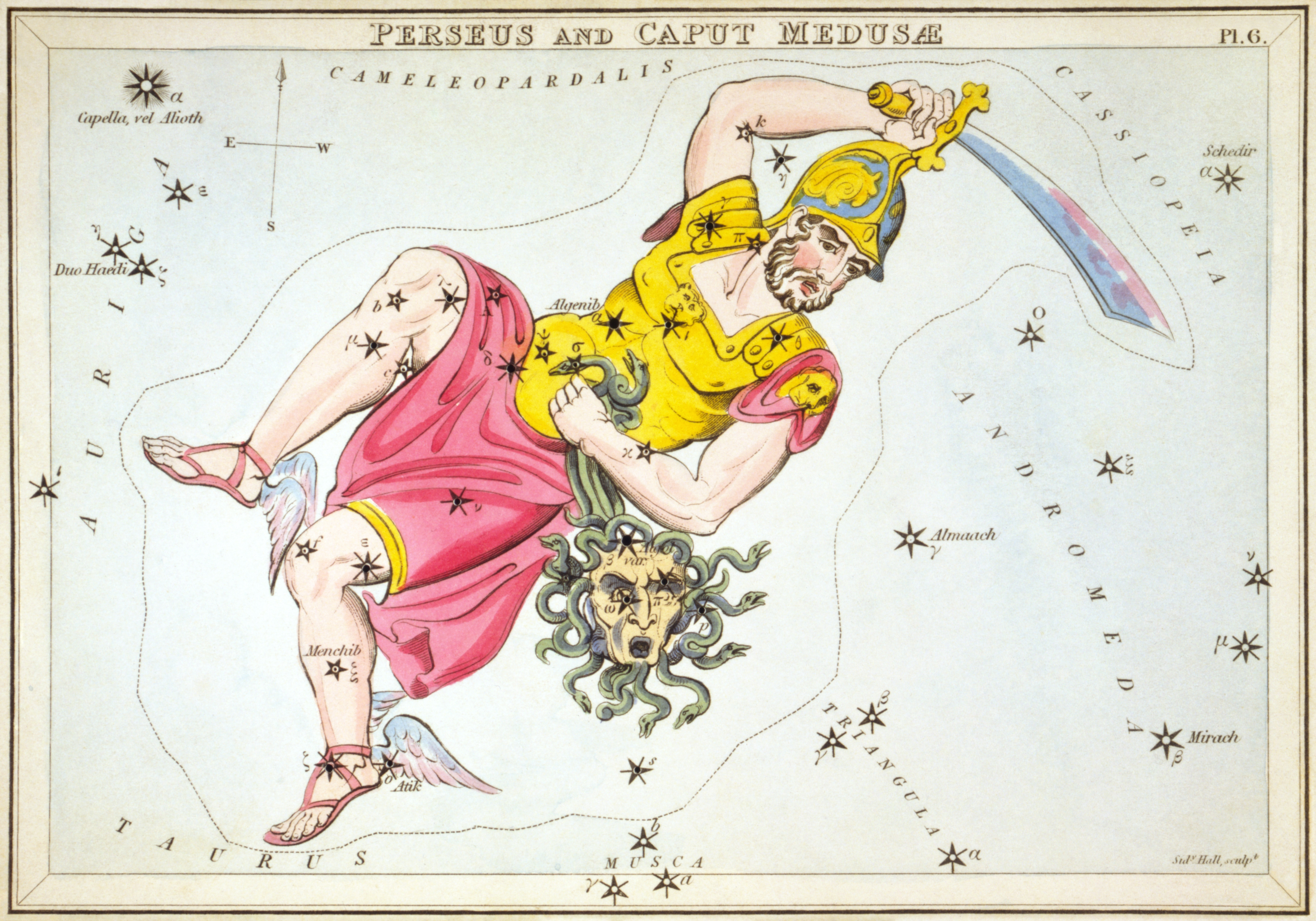
Perseus with Medusa's head, from Urania's Mirror, a set of constellation cards, London, c. 1825

The constellation of Perseus is one of the classical Greek constellations. The legend says that because he was so brave fighting Cetus for someone else he was given a place in the stars forever. It is located in the east in the winter at about the Latitude 10-N. It is not far from the stars Betelgeuse and Sirius; his wife's constellation Andromeda is also nearby. It is southward from Cassiopeia, and to the left of Taurus. His constellation contains the most famous variable star Algol and some deep sky objects such as Messier 34, the Double Cluster, the California Nebula, and the Little Dumbbell Nebula (Messier 76). There are eight named stars in the constellation Algol, Atik, Berehinya, Menkib, Miram, Mirfak, Misam, and Muspelheim. It was cataloged in the 2nd century by the Greek astronomer Ptolemy and is known for the famous Perseid Meteor Shower. There is in fact a whole family of constellations based on the myth of Perseus, which includes Andromeda, Cassiopeia, Cepheus, and Cetus. There is also a molecular cloud in the constellation that is 600 light years from the Solar System. There is also a cluster of galaxies called the Perseus cluster. There is one galaxy in the cluster named Caldwell 24 which is a powerful source for radio and X-ray waves. It has a visual magnitude of 12.6 and is 237 million light years away from the Milky Way galaxy.

== In culture ==
Ishmael, the narrator of Herman Melville's Moby Dick, equates the ceti, or Leviathans, of Antiquity with the modern understanding of the sperm whale, and therefore names Perseus as the progenitor and "prince" of all whalers. The myth of Andromeda is recalled as a supposed early period of honor-bound, "knightly" whaling, when such creatures were fought and killed for the protection of mankind rather than the pursuit of profit.

== See also ==
- Eurybarus and Alcyoneus
- Menestratus and Cleostratus
- Lugh
- List of operas based on the Andromeda myth
- Lully
- Ibert (1921)
- Chimera
- Aethiopia
- The Story of Perseus and the Gorgon's Head, a short novel published in 1898

== Bibliography ==
- Apollodorus, The Library with an English Translation by Sir James George Frazer, F.B.A., F.R.S. in 2 Volumes, Cambridge, MA, Harvard University Press; London, William Heinemann Ltd. 1921. ISBN 0-674-99135-4. Online version at the Perseus Digital Library. Greek text available from the same website.
- Apollonius Rhodius, Argonautica translated by Robert Cooper Seaton (1853–1915), R. C. Loeb Classical Library Volume 001. London, William Heinemann Ltd, 1912. Online version at the Topos Text Project.
- Apollonius Rhodius, Argonautica. George W. Mooney. London. Longmans, Green. 1912. Greek text available at the Perseus Digital Library.
- Herodotus, The Histories with an English translation by A.D. Godley. Cambridge. Harvard University Press. 1920. ISBN 0-674-99133-8. Online version at the Topos Text Project. Greek text available at Perseus Digital Library.
- Hesiod, Theogony from The Homeric Hymns and Homerica with an English Translation by Hugh G. Evelyn-White, Cambridge, MA., Harvard University Press; London, William Heinemann Ltd. 1914. Online version at the Perseus Digital Library. Greek text available from the same website.
- Pausanias, Description of Greece with an English Translation by W.H.S. Jones, Litt.D., and H.A. Ormerod, M.A., in 4 Volumes. Cambridge, MA, Harvard University Press; London, William Heinemann Ltd. 1918. ISBN 0-674-99328-4. Online version at the Perseus Digital Library
- Pausanias, Graeciae Descriptio. 3 vols. Leipzig, Teubner. 1903. Greek text available at the Perseus Digital Library.
- Publius Ovidius Naso, Metamorphoses translated by Brookes More (1859–1942). Boston, Cornhill Publishing Co. 1922. Online version at the Perseus Digital Library.
- Publius Ovidius Naso, Metamorphoses. Hugo Magnus. Gotha (Germany). Friedr. Andr. Perthes. 1892. Latin text available at the Perseus Digital Library.
- Suida, Suda Encyclopedia translated by Ross Scaife, David Whitehead, William Hutton, Catharine Roth, Jennifer Benedict, Gregory Hays, Malcolm Heath Sean M. Redmond, Nicholas Fincher, Patrick Rourke, Elizabeth Vandiver, Raphael Finkel, Frederick Williams, Carl Widstrand, Robert Dyer, Joseph L. Rife, Oliver Phillips and many others. Online version at the Topos Text Project.
- Cartwright, Mark. "Perseus". World History Encyclopedia, World History Encyclopedia, 8 Mar. 2022.
- NSF, NOIRLab. "Perseus Mythology". Globe at Night, 2019,.
- Ogden, Daniel. "Perseus". Routledge & CRC Press, 2008.
- Parada, Carlos, and Maicar Förlag. "Perseus". Perseus 1 – Greek Mythology Link, 1997.
- "Perseus Mythology". Globe at Night,
