= Gorgophone (daughter of Perseus) =

Greek mythological figure

In Greek mythology, Gorgophone (Ancient Greek: Γοργοφόνη, lit. 'Gorgon-slayer') was queen of both Messenia and Sparta and one of the Perseids, as a daughter of Perseus and Andromeda. Her name means "Gorgon Slayer", a tribute to her father Perseus who killed Medusa, the mortal Gorgon.

== Biography ==
Gorgophone was a Mycenean princess as the daughter of Greek hero Perseus and his wife Andromeda. She was the sister of Perses, Alcaeus, Heleus, Mestor, Sthenelus of Mycenae, Autochthe, and Electryon. She was said to be buried in Argos.

Gorgophone was a prominent figure in the mythical history of Sparta, having been married to two kings: Perieres of Messenia and Oebalus of Laconia. She is considered the first woman to have married twice. As a result, many of her children's parentage is disputed. After the death of her first husband Perieres by whom she had sons Aphareus and Leucippus, Gorgophone took Oebalus as her second spouse. With him she had a daughter, Arene. Her sons Tyndareus, Icarius, and Pisus have been named as the sons of both kings, and their parentage varies between accounts.

Gorgophone's descendants played a central role in the Homeric epics and the legendary pre-history of Greece. Tyndareus was the mortal father of Helen of Troy, Clytemnestra, Castor and Pollux, Timandra, and Phoebe. Icarius was the father of Odysseus's wife, Penelope. According to some sources, Lecippus' daughter Arsinoe was the lover of Apollo and the mother of the god Asclepius.

Comparative table of Gorgophone's family
| Relation | Names | Sources | | | |
| Relation | Names | Apollodorus | Pausanias | | Tzetzes |
|---|---|---|---|---|---|
| Relation | Names | Apollodorus | Pausanias | | Lyco. |
| Parents | Perseus and Andromeda | ✓ | | | |
| Parents | Perseus | | ✓ | | |
| Husband | Perieres | ✓ | | ✓ | ✓ |
| Husband | Oebalus | | ✓ | | |
| Children | Aphareus | ✓ | | ✓ | ✓ |
| Children | Leucippus | ✓ | | ✓ | ✓ |
| Children | Tyndareus | ✓ | ✓ | | ✓ |
| Children | Icarius | ✓ | | | ✓ |
| Children | Arene | | ✓ | | |
| Children | Pisus (possibly) | | | ✓ | |
