= Cetus (mythology) =

Sea monster in Greek mythology

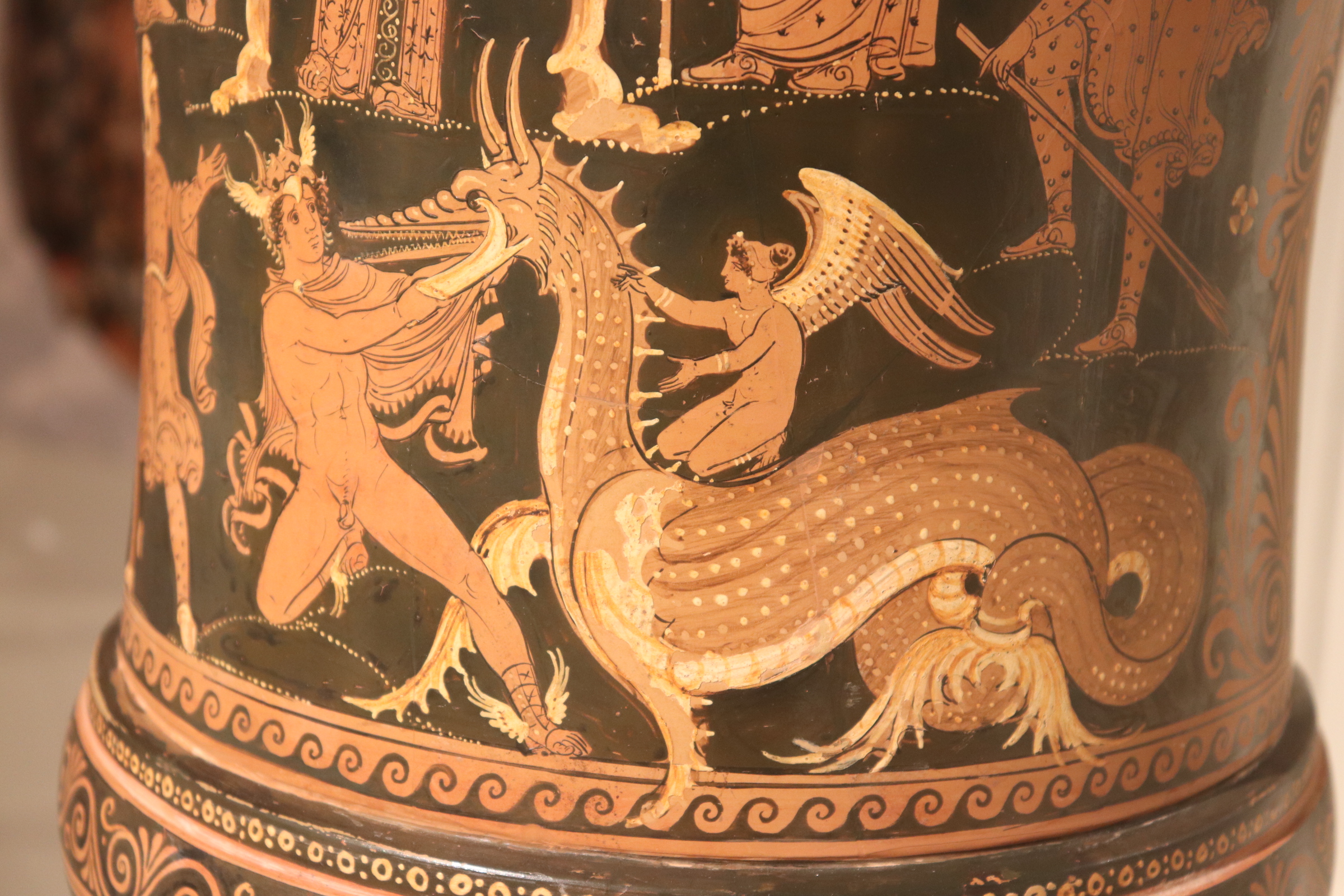
Ancient vase motif depicting the Greek hero Perseus fighting a Cetus sea serpent

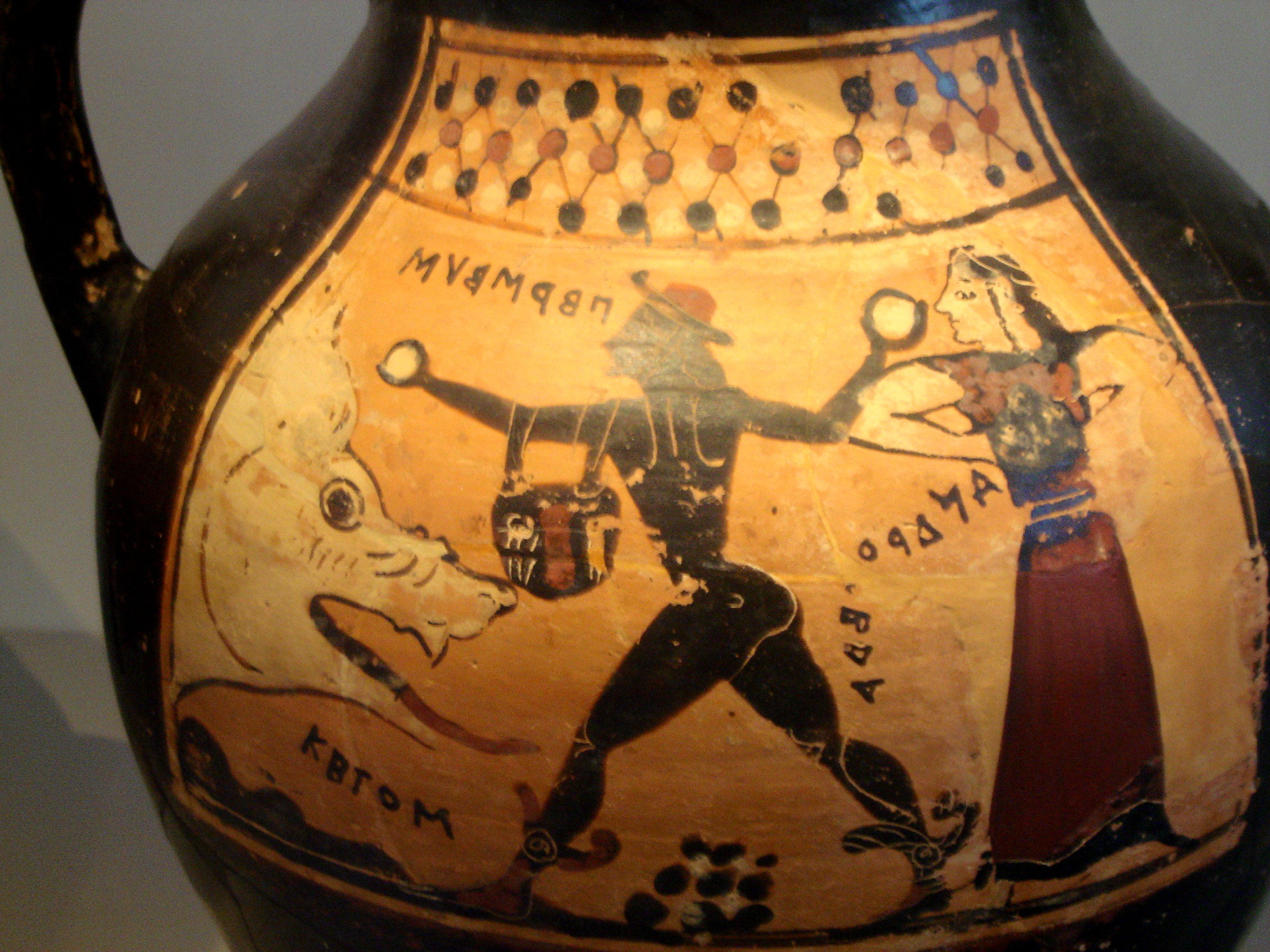
Ancient Corinthian vase depicting Perseus, Andromeda and Ketos (Names are spelled in the archaic Corinthian variant of the Greek alphabet.)

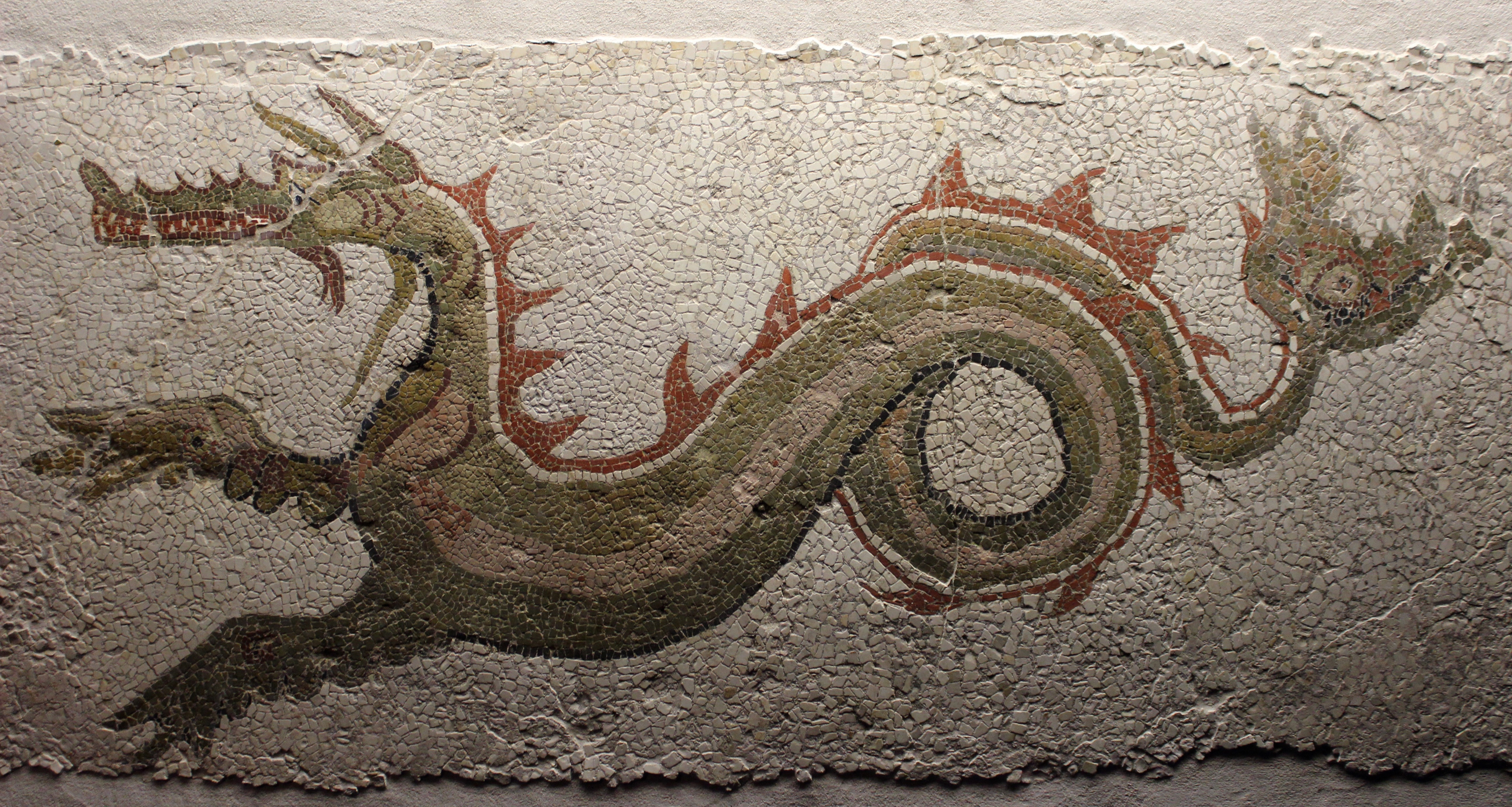
Ancient Greek mosaic in Kaulon of a cetus sea serpent

In Greek mythology, a cetus (Ancient Greek: Κῆτος, romanized: Kêtos) is a large sea monster. Perseus slew a cetus to save Andromeda from being sacrificed to it. Later, before the Trojan War, Heracles also killed one to rescue Hesione. In Greek art, ceti were depicted as serpentine fish.

== Etymology ==
In Ancient Greek ketos (κῆτος, plural kete/ketea, κήτη/κήτεα), Latinized as cetus (pl. ceti or cete = cetea), is any huge sea monster. The name of the mythological figure Ceto is derived from kētos.

== Depictions ==
A cetus was variously described as a sea monster or sea serpent. Some versions describe a cetus as a sea monster with the head of a wild boar or greyhound and the body of a whale or a dolphin with divided, fan-like tails. Ceti were said to be colossal beasts the size of a ship, their skulls alone measuring 40 feet (12 meters) in length, their spines being a cubit in thickness, and their skeletons taller at the shoulder than any elephant.

There are notable physical and mythological similarities between a cetus and a drakōn (the dragons in Greek mythology), and, to a lesser extent, other monsters of Greek myth, such as Scylla, Charybdis, and Medusa and her Gorgon sisters.

== Greek mythology ==
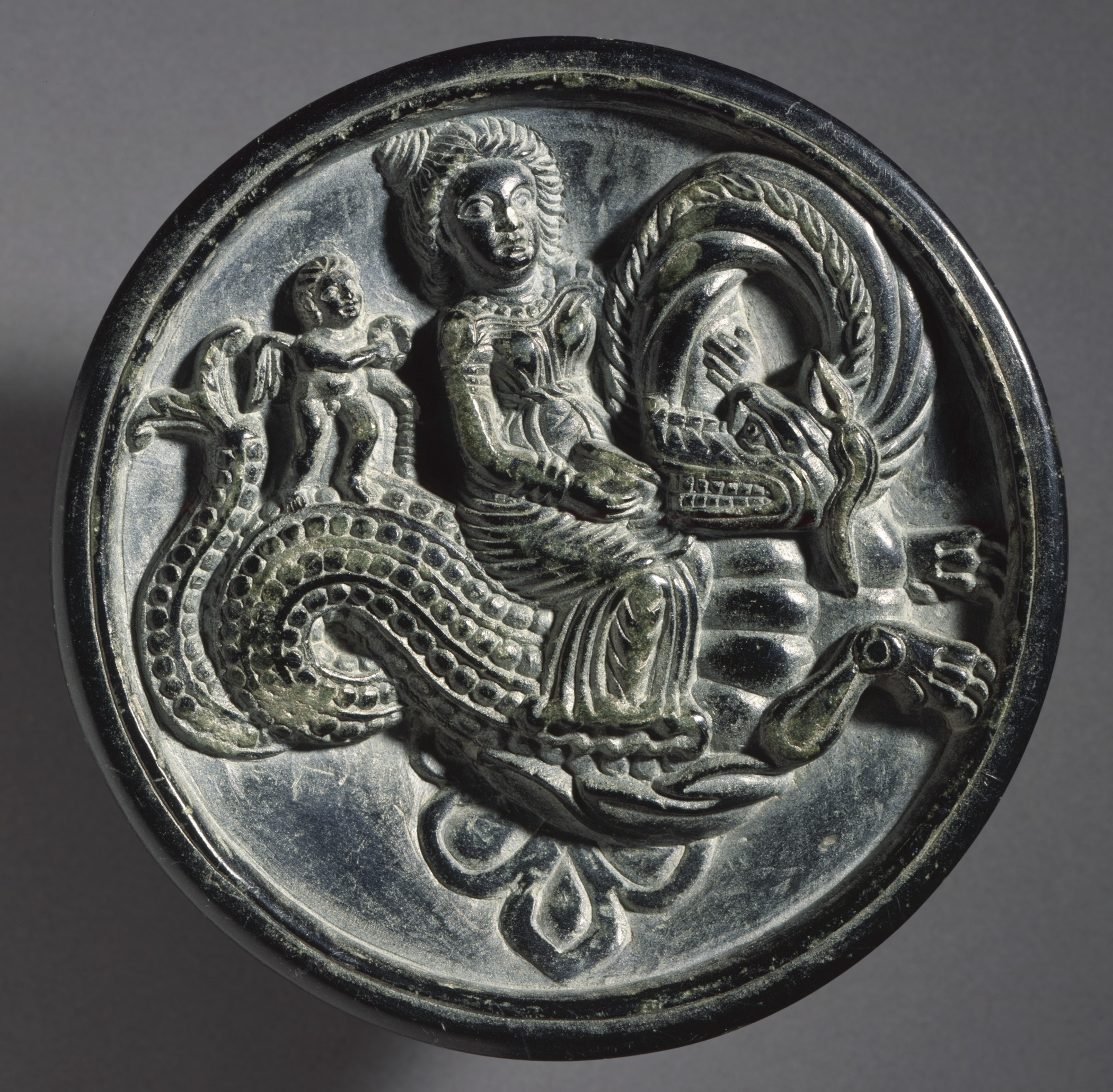
Ritual stone palette a Nereid (sea nymph) and a cherub riding a sea monster (ketos). Gandhara.

Cetus are often depicted fighting Perseus or as the mount of a Nereid.

Queen Cassiopeia boasted that she and her daughter Andromeda were more beautiful than the Nereids, invoking the wrath of Poseidon who sent a cetus to attack Æthiopia. Upon consulting a wise oracle, King Cepheus and Queen Cassiopeia were told to sacrifice Andromeda to the cetus. They had Andromeda chained to a rock near the ocean so that the cetus could devour her. After finding Andromeda chained to the rock and learning of her plight, Perseus managed to slay the cetus when the creature emerged from the ocean to devour her. According to one version, Perseus slew the cetus with the harpe lent to him by Hermes. According to another version, he used Medusa's head to turn the sea monster to stone.

In a different story, Heracles slew a cetus to save Hesione.

A cetus had also been portrayed to support Ino and Melicertes when they threw themselves into the sea instead of a dolphin to carry Palaemon.

In both cases, the ruler annoyed Poseidon.

== Etruscan mythology ==
In Etruscan mythology, the cetea were regarded as psychopomps, being depicted frequently on sarcophagi and urns, along with dolphins and hippocamps.

Furthermore, the Etruscan deity Nethuns is sometimes shown wearing a headdress depicting a Cetus.

== Bible and Jewish mythology ==
=== The tannin sea monsters ===
The monster tannin in the Hebrew Bible has been translated as Greek kētos in the Septuagint, and cetus in the Latin Vulgate.

Tanninim (תַּנִּינִים) (-im denotes Hebraic plural) appear in the Hebrew Book of Genesis, Exodus, Deuteronomy, Psalms, (Note: Ps. 74:13, 91:13, 148:7, and possibly 44:20.) Job, Ezekiel, Isaiah, and Jeremiah. They are explicitly listed among the creatures created by God on the fifth day of the Genesis creation narrative, translated in the King James Version as "great whales". The Septuagint renders the original Hebrew of Genesis 1:21 (hattanninim haggedolim) as κήτη τὰ μεγάλα (kētē ta megala) in Greek, and this was in turn translated as cete grandia in the Vulgate. The tannin is listed in the apocalypse of Isaiah as among the sea beasts to be slain by Yahweh "on that day", translated in the King James Version as "the dragon". (Note: This passage in Isaiah directly parallels another from the earlier Baal Cycle. The Hebrew passage describing the tannin takes the place of a Ugaritic one describing "the encircler" or "the mighty one with seven heads" (šlyṭ d.šbʿt rašm). In both the Ugaritic and Hebrew texts, it is debatable whether three figures are being described or whether the others are epithets of Lotan or Leviathan.)

=== Conflation with Leviathan and Rahab ===
In Jewish mythology, Tannin is sometimes conflated with the related sea monsters Leviathan and Rahab. Along with Rahab, "Tannin" was a name applied to ancient Egypt after the Exodus to Canaan. Joseph Eddy Fontenrose noted that "cetus" was a counterpart of Tiamat-based Medusa, and was modelled after Yam and Mot and Leviathan.

=== Jonah's "great fish" ===
In Jonah 1:17 (in Christian Bibles; 2:1 in the Jewish Tanakh), the Hebrew text reads dag gadol (דג גדול), which literally means "great fish". The Septuagint translates this phrase into Greek as mega kētos (μέγα κῆτος). This was at the start of more widespread depiction of real whales in Greece and kētos would cover proven whales, sharks and the old meaning of curious sea monsters. Jerome later translated this phrase as piscis grandis in his Latin Vulgate. However, he translated the Greek word kētos as cetus in Gospel of Matthew 12:40. The NIV opts for the former: "For as Jonah was three days and three nights in the belly of a huge fish, so the Son of Man will be three days and three nights in the heart of the earth." In contrast, the KJV has "whale".

== In other cultures ==
Art historian John Boardman conjectured that images of the kētos in Central Asia influenced depictions of the Chinese Dragon and Indian makara. Boardman suggested that after contact with Silk Road images of a kētos, the Chinese dragon appeared more reptilian and shifted head-shape; the Pig dragon with the head of a boar compared to the reptilian head of modern dragons that of a camel.

== Ships and sailing ==
Cetus or megakētēs (μεγακήτης) is commonly used as a ship's name or figurehead denoting a ship unafraid of the sea or a ruthless pirate ship to be feared. Cetea were widely viewed as misfortune or bad omen by sailors widely influenced by the Mediterranean traditions such as the bringer of a great storm or general harbinger. Lore and tales associated it with lost cargo and being swept off course, even pirates being allied with such creatures so as to become taboo aboard vessels.

== See also ==
- Black Tortoise—Cetus and the Black Tortoise correspond in astrology, as both creatures possess affinities to water and travel in the underworld to guide people (see also: Cetus in Chinese astronomy)
- Cetus
- Ketu (mythology)
- Kraken
