= Cassiopeia (mother of Andromeda) =

Figure in Greek and Roman mythology

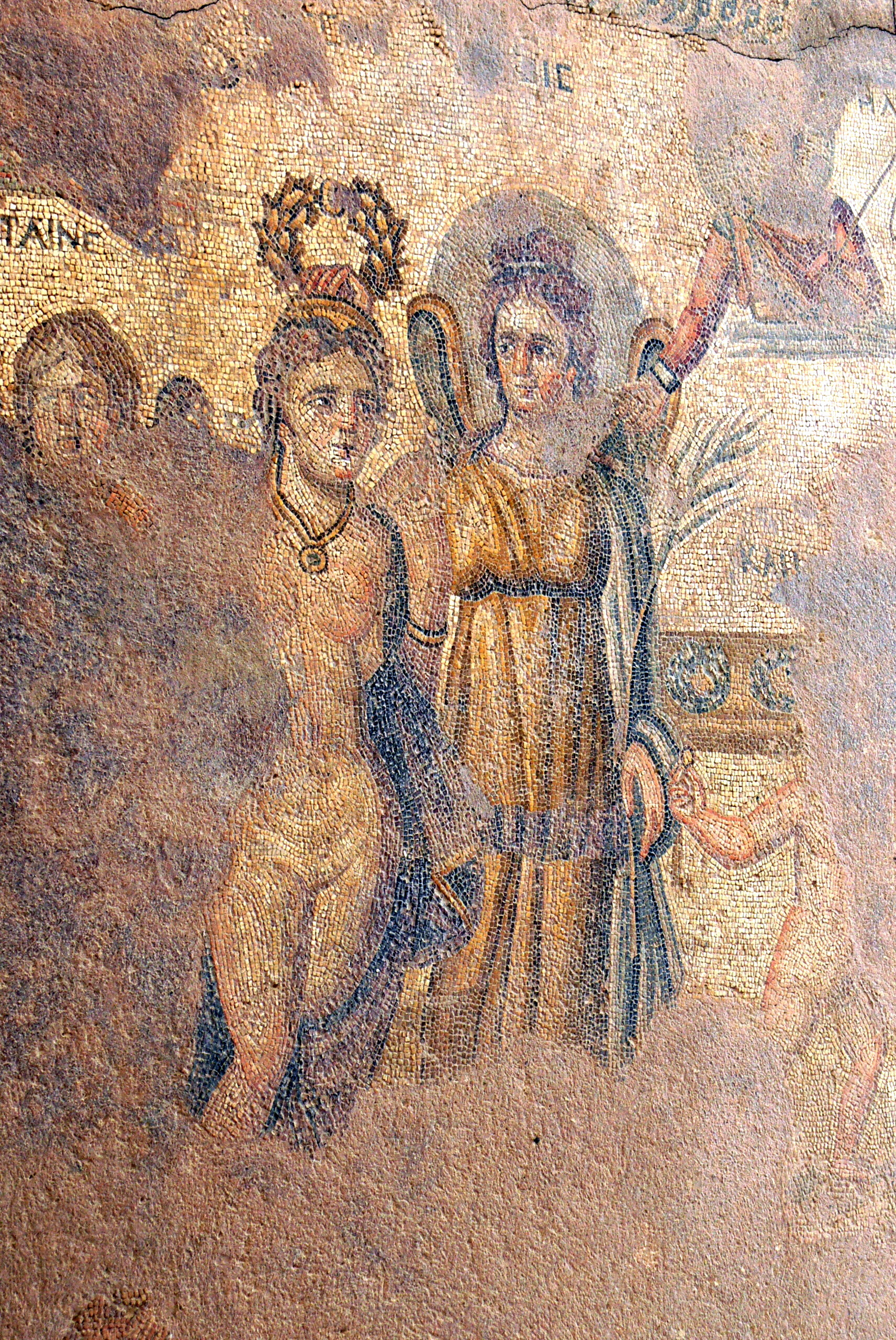
Cassiopeia winning the contest against the Nereids on a 4th-century Roman mosaic from Paphos in Cyprus.

Cassiopeia (/ˌkæsi.oʊˈpiː.ə/; Ancient Greek: Κασσιόπεια, romanized: Kassiópeia), also variously spelled as Cassiope (Ancient Greek: Κασσιόπη, romanized: Kassiópē) or Cassiepeia (Ancient Greek: Κασσιέπεια, romanized: Kassiépeia), is a figure in Greek and Roman mythology, the queen of Aethiopia and wife of King Cepheus. She was arrogant and vain, characteristics that led to the endangerment of her daughter Andromeda and her own downfall.

== Family ==
Her origins are obscure. Nonnus calls her a nymph, while according to Stephanus she was called Iope, the daughter of Aeolus, from whom the town of Joppa (Jaffa) derived its name.

== Mythology ==
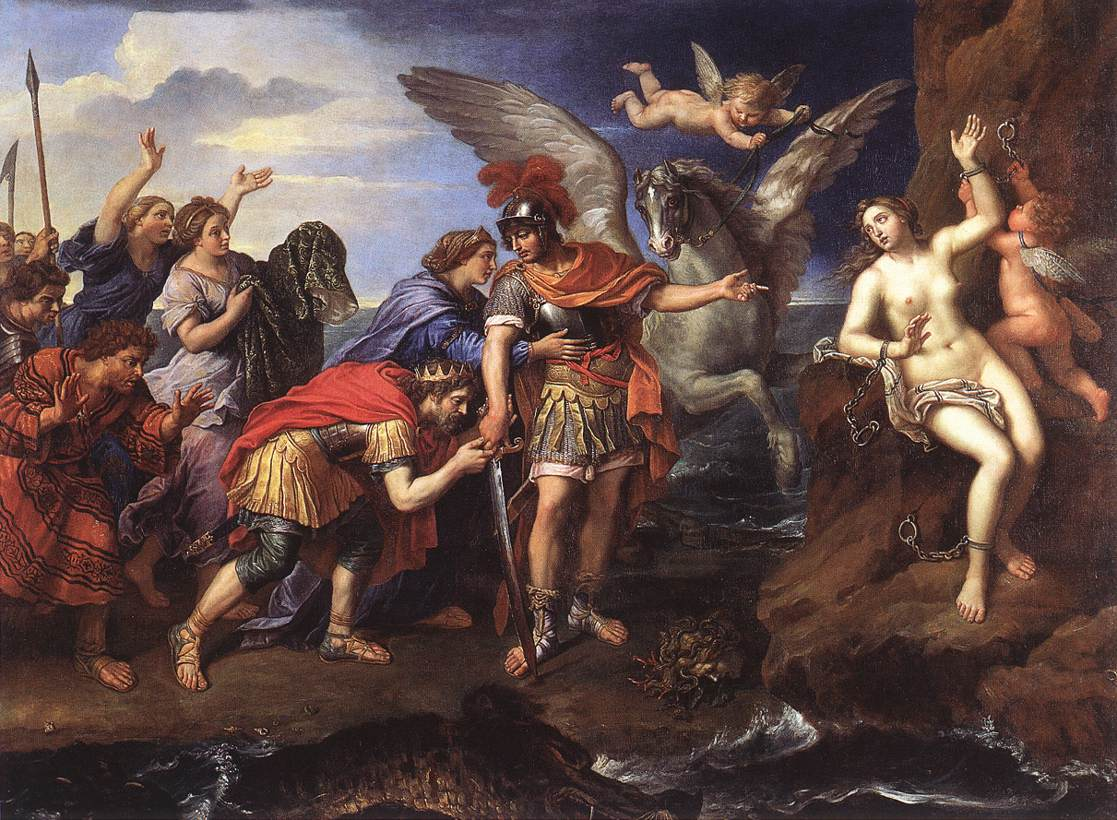
The king of Ethiopia Cepheus and the queen Cassiopeia thank Perseus for freeing their daughter Andromeda, La Délivrance d'Andromède (1679) Pierre Mignard, Louvre

Cassiopeia boasted that she (or her daughter Andromeda), was more beautiful than all the Nereids, the nymph-daughters of the sea god Nereus. This brought the wrath of Poseidon, ruling god of the sea, upon the kingdom of Aethiopia.

Accounts differ as to whether Poseidon decided to flood the whole country or direct the sea monster Cetus to destroy it. In either case, trying to save their kingdom, Cepheus and Cassiopeia consulted an oracle of Zeus, who told them that the only way to appease the sea gods was to sacrifice their daughter.

Accordingly, Andromeda was chained to a rock at the sea's edge and left to be killed by the sea monster. Perseus arrived and instead killed Cetus, saved Andromeda and married her.

Poseidon thought Cassiopeia should not escape punishment, so he placed her in the heavens chained to a throne in a position that referenced Andromeda's ordeal. The constellation resembles the chair that originally represented an instrument of torture. Cassiopeia is not always represented tied to the chair in torment; in some later drawings she holds a mirror, symbol of her vanity, while in others she holds a palm frond.

== Constellation ==
The constellation Cassiopeia, near to the pole star, can be seen from latitudes north of 35°N during the whole year. The constellation is also visible in countries north of the Tropic of Capricorn, in late spring.

== Ethiopian tradition ==
According to the 1922 regnal list of Ethiopia, Cassiopeia ruled Ethiopia as part of the Agdazyan dynasty and reigned for 19 years from 1890 to 1871 BC, with dates following the Ethiopian calendar.

== See also ==
- Lists of stars by constellation
- Chione
- Antigone
