= Harpe =

Greek mythological weapon

The harpē (Ancient Greek: ἅρπη) is a weapon that appears in Greek mythology. It is the standard weapon used for the amputation of Greek mythological monsters, particularly those that are anguiform. The earliest appearance of the harpe as a mythological weapon is in Hesiod's Theogony (8th or 7th century BC), where the Titan Cronus uses it to sever his father's genitals. The hero Perseus uses a harpe to decapitate the monster Medusa, and is depicted with the weapon in ancient Greek art from the 6th century BC. The harpe also appears in the story of Zeus's battle against the monster Typhon and Heracles's fight with the Lernaean Hydra.

== In mythology ==
In Greek mythology, the harpe first appears as a weapon in the Theogony of Hesiod (8th or 7th century BC). Hesiod writes that the sickle the Titan Cronus uses to castrate his father, Uranus, is a harpe. This harpe is said to be composed of adamant ('unconquerable'), which in antiquity was thought to be the hardest metal. According to Martin Litchfield West, Hesiod would have conceived of this harpe as a regular agricultural sickle. West also writes that the weapon was an early element of the succession myth (the myth of the overthrowing of multiple successive generations that appears in the Theogony), and that Cronus's use of the harpe in the story does not necessarily imply he had a special connection with it.

In Greek myths involving the amputation of monsters, the harpe is the standard weapon used for this task; it is associated with amputation stories involving anguiform creatures in particular. It is the means by which the hero Perseus beheads the Gorgon Medusa, a women with living snakes for hair. In ancient Greek art, the hero appears armed with the weapon from the late 6th century BC; it is depicted early on as a short sickle and later as having two blades, one from a sword and the other from a sickle. Perseus's harpe first appears in literature in Aeschylus's Phorcides, in which he receives it from the god Hephaestus. According to Lucan, Hermes is instead the god who supplied Perseus with the weapon. The hero also uses the harpe in his fight with Cetus, a snaky sea monster, although no amputation results from that encounter. According to Lucian, the 2nd-century AD fraudulent prophet Alexander of Abonoteichus wielded a harpe and asserted that Perseus was his forebear.

The god Zeus also makes use of an adamantine harpe in his battle against the serpentine monster Typhon. Zeus is said to be disarmed by his foe, who uses the weapon to sever the sinews in his hands and feet. In ancient art, the hero Heracles is shown using a harpe to remove the snake heads of the Lernaean Hydra. In these artworks, the creature's necks are depicted so as to look similar to a crop. Similarly, the 5th-century AD poet Nonnus's account of Perseus's defeat of Medusa deliberately alludes to what Daniel Ogden describes as the "imagery of the reaping and harvesting of snakes". The hero Iolaus, who is shown assisting Heracles in depictions of the latter's fight with the Hydra, is shown wielding the weapon in his earliest appearances. In some versions of Hermes's slaying of the giant Argus Panoptes, the weapon he uses is a harpe. Lucan writes that this was the harpe the god later gave to Perseus.

== Gallery ==
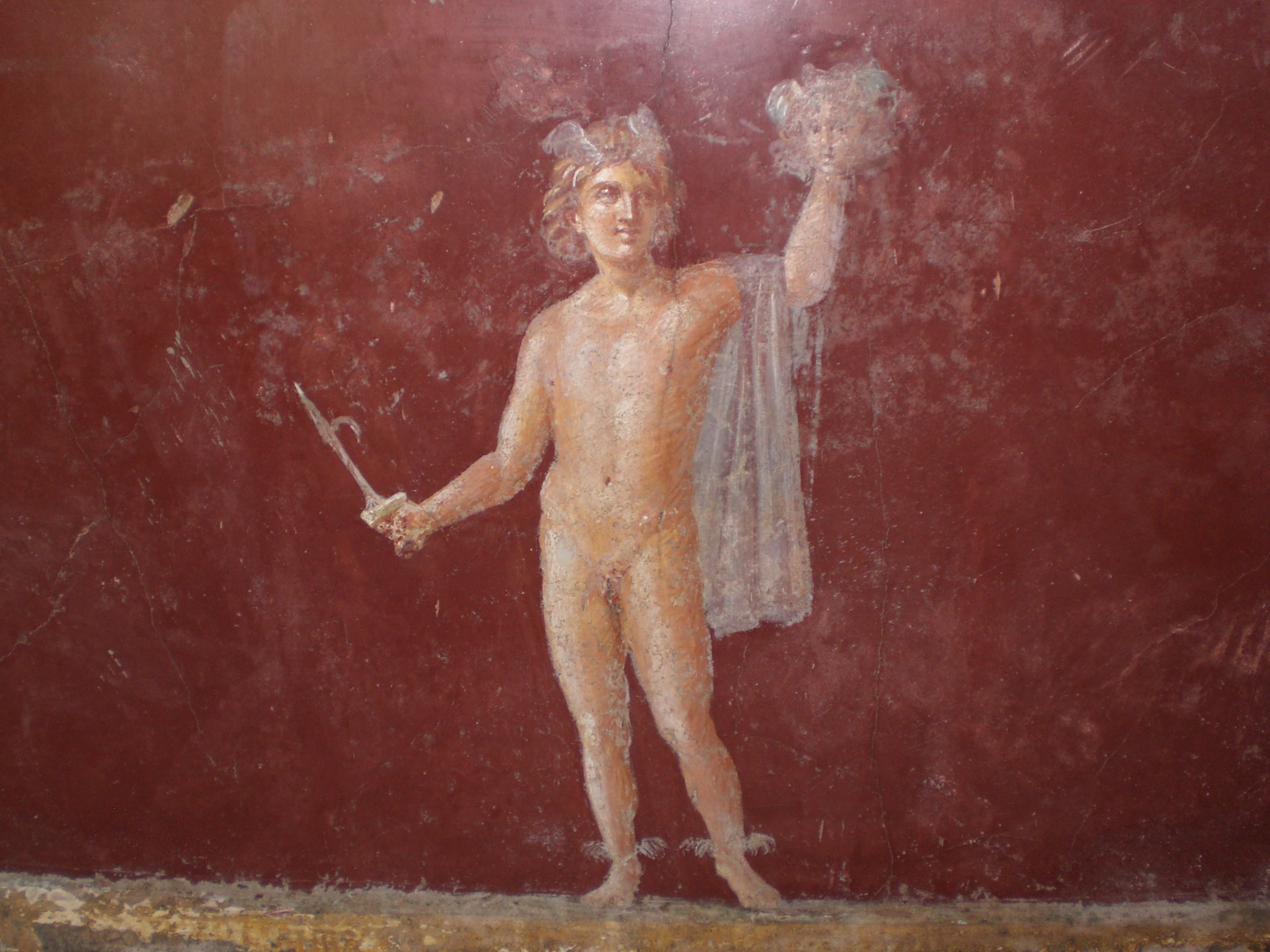
Roman Fresco of Villa San Marco in Stabiae depicting Perseus with a sickle after slaying Medusa

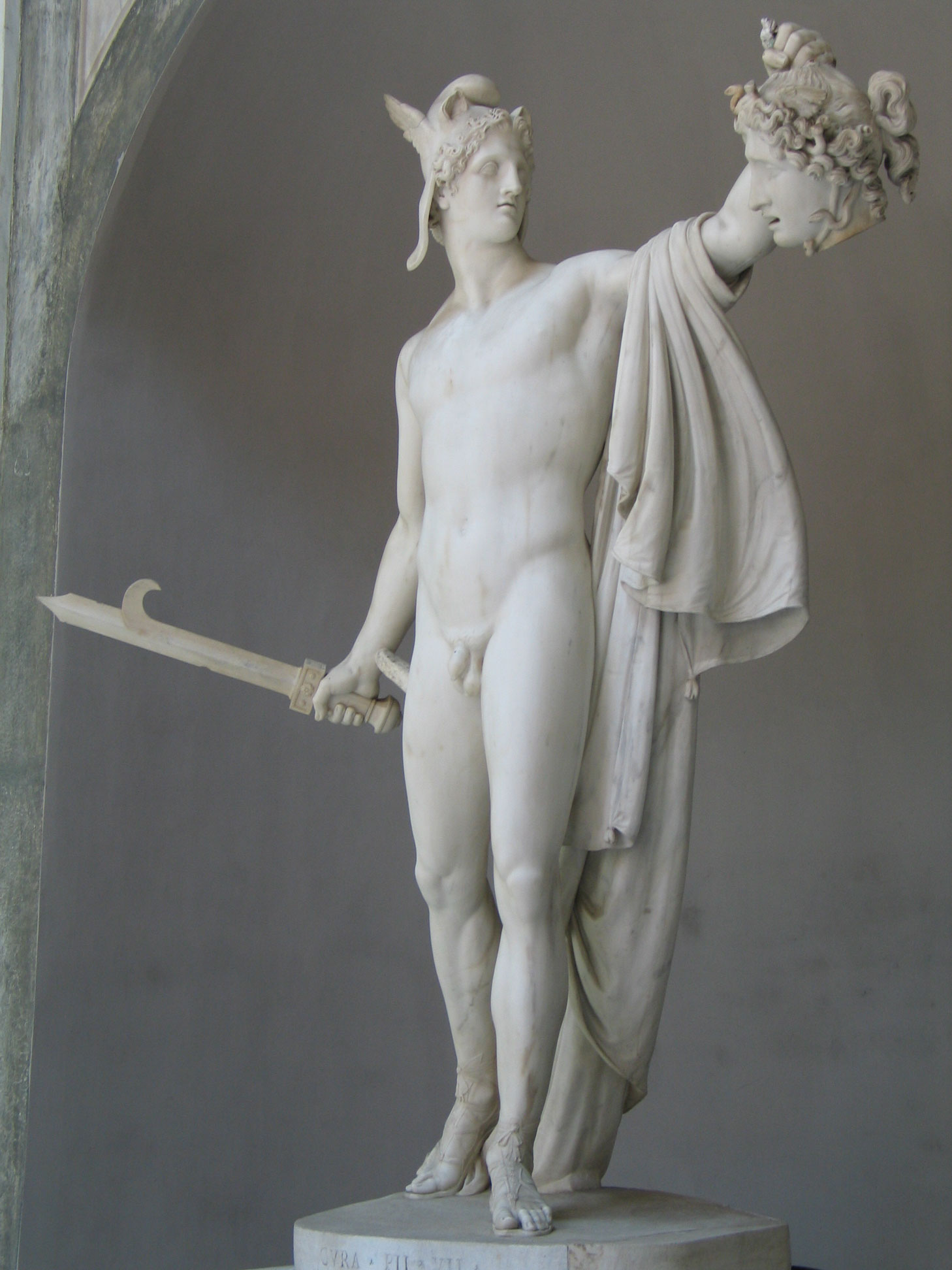
Perseus Triumphant depicts Perseus armed with a harpe sword when he beheaded Medusa
