= Cepheus (father of Andromeda) =

King of Aethiopia in Greek mythology

- King of Aethiopia
- Perseus and Cepheus on an Apulian red-figure volute krater c. 410-400 BC, Archaeological Museum of Taranto
- Region: Aethiopia or various others

Genealogy
- Parents: Belus or Agenor or Phoenix (father); Achiroe (mother)
- Siblings: Danaus, Aegyptus, Phineus
- Consort: Cassiopeia
- Offspring: Andromeda

In Greek mythology, Cepheus (/ˈsiːfiəs, -fjuːs/; Ancient Greek: Κηφεύς, romanized: Kepheús, lit. 'gardener') was the king of Aethiopia and the father of Andromeda, the princess who is saved by the hero Perseus.

== Family ==
Cepheus was the son of either Belus, Agenor or Phoenix. When Belus is described as his father, Achiroe, daughter of Nilus, is given as his mother, and Danaus, Aegyptus, and Phineus as his brothers. He was called Iasid Cepheus, pertaining to his Argive ancestry through King Iasus of Argus, father of Io.

== Mythology ==
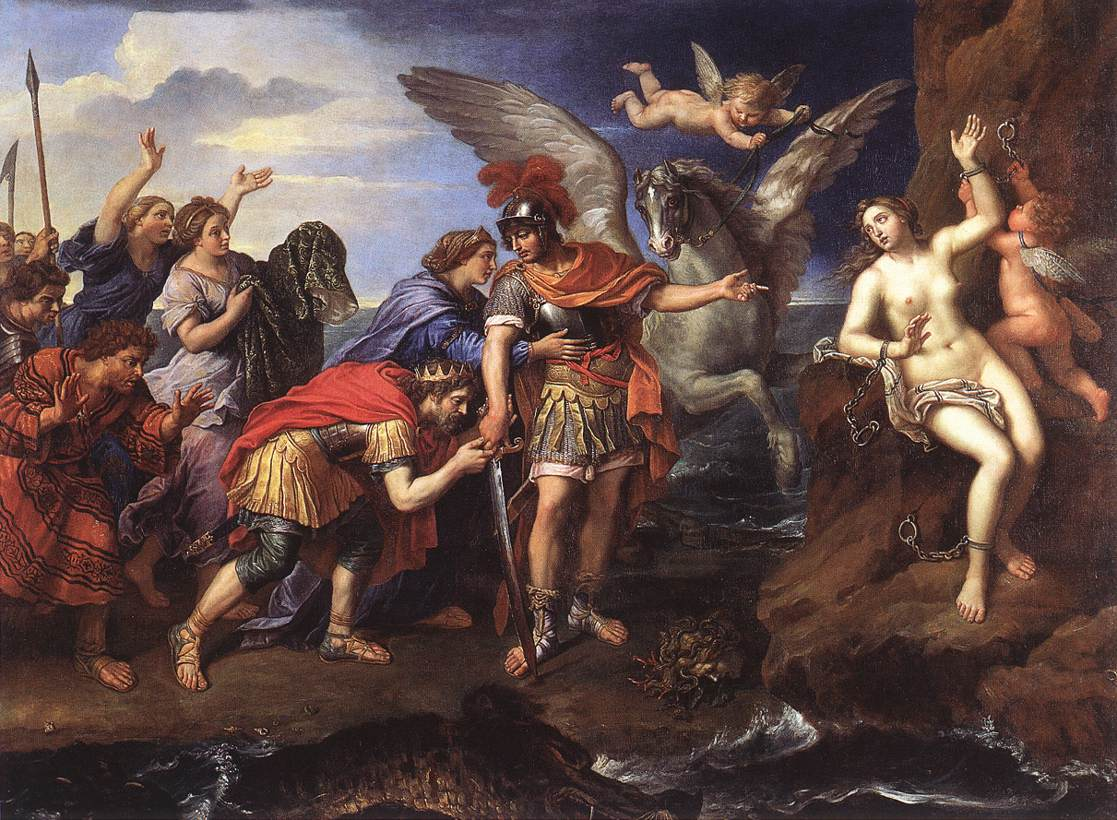
Metamorphoses of Ovide (the king of Greece, Céphée, and the queen, Cassiopé, thank the hero Perseus for having delivered their daughter Andromeda, offered in sacrifice to a marine monster) by Pierre Mignard (1679) at Louvre Museum, Paris

Cepheus features in the Perseus legend as the husband of Cassiopeia, the father of Princess Andromeda, and the brother of Phineus (who expects to marry Andromeda). Various sources identify his kingdom as "Aethiopia" or later, as the city of Joppa (Jaffa) in Phoenicia, which was named after Cepheus's wife, Iope, a daughter of Aeolus.

Cassiopeia boasts that Andromeda is more beautiful than the Nereids, angering both the sea nymphs and Poseidon. In response, Poseidon sends a flood and the sea monster Cetus to attack Aethiopia. Cepheus and Cassiopeia seek guidance from the oracle of Ammon (identified with Zeus) at the oasis of Siwa in the Libyan desert; the oracle declares that only offering Andromeda to the monster as a human sacrifice will end the calamity. The king chains his daughter to a rock by the shore to be devoured by Cetus at the whim of his subjects.

But Andromeda survives: Perseus, flying home with his trophy head of Medusa, passes by the kingdom of Cepheus and notices a beautiful girl chained to a rock on the shore. Perseus falls in love with her and undertakes to slay the monster if she promises to marry him; in a slightly different version, he approaches Cepheus. The hero then kills the monster (or turns it to stone by showing it the Gorgon's head). Perseus washes off his blood in a spring near the city of Joppa, which apocryphally turns red as a result.

Cepheus and Cassiopeia allow Perseus to become Andromeda's husband after he uses Medusa's head to turn Phineus and his men to stone for plotting against him. (According to Hyginus, the betrothed of Andromeda is named Agenor.) After spending a year or so at the court of his father-in-law, Perseus finally sets off for Seriphos with his wife. Since Cepheus has no heir of his own, the departing couple allows him to adopt their first-born child, Perses, who is destined mythologically to give his name to the Persians (Ancient Greek: Πέρσαι, romanized: Pérsai) per Greek folk etymology.

Zeus subsequently places Cepheus in the heavens as the constellation Cepheus located alongside Cassiopeia and near both Andromeda and Perseus.
