= Perses (son of Perseus) =

Son of Perseus in Greek mythology

In Greek mythology, Perses (/ˈpɜːrsiz/; Ancient Greek: Πέρσης, romanized: Pérsēs) is one of the Perseids, as a son of Perseus and Andromeda. Perses was left to rule Persia, where he became the legendary ancestor of the Persian people.

== Family ==
Perses was one of the several children born to Perseus and Andromeda, and was thus brother to Heleus, Alcaeus, Sthenelus, Electryon, Mestor and Gorgophone.

== Mythology ==
Greek mythology identifies Perses as the ancestor of the Persians. According to the story, Perses was his parents' first child, born in Andromeda's homeland (Persia in those versions) and was left there by his parents when they departed for Argos to inherit his maternal grandfather's kingdom, for Cepheus had no male heirs of his own; the people living there, who were previously called Cephenes, received their new name—the Persians—from him. Hellanicus meanwhile placed the Cephenes in nearby Babylon. Centuries later Apollodorus repeats the same tale, though for him Andromeda's homeland is Aethiopia—Perses however still becomes the ancestor of the Persians. John Tzetzes wrote the same.

In the early fifth century BC Xerxes tried to use this legendary ancestry shared between Greeks and Persians during his invasion of Greece to bribe the Argives, but he ultimately failed to do so. The pseudo-Platonic dialogue First Alcibiades, written in the late 4th century BC, identifies him with Achaemenes as the hero founder of the Persians, stating that both Achaemenes and Heracles were descendants of Perseus.

According to Pliny the Elder, Perses was said to have invented arrows.

== Analysis ==
Daniel Ogden thinks the association between the myth and the Persians was due to the similarity between Cepheus and Cephenes, as well as the ancient Greek tendency to connect new lands and people to their existing mythology.

== Bibliography ==
- Apollodorus, Apollodorus, The Library, with an English Translation by Sir James George Frazer, F.B.A., F.R.S. in 2 Volumes, Cambridge, Massachusetts, Harvard University Press; London, William Heinemann, 1921. ISBN 0-674-99135-4. Online version at the Perseus Digital Library.
- Herodotus, The Histories, translated by A. D. Godley, Cambridge, Massachusetts, Harvard University Press, 1920. ISBN 0674991338. Online version at the Perseus Digital Library.
- Hesiod, The Shield. Catalogue of Women. Other Fragments. Edited and translated by Glenn W. Most. Loeb Classical Library 503. Cambridge, MA: Harvard University Press, 2018. Available online at Loeb Classical Library.
- Ogden, Daniel (2008). Perseus. New York, US: Routledge. ISBN 0-415-42725-8.
- Pliny, The Natural History with an English translation by John Bostock, M.D., F.R.S. H.T. Riley, Esq., B.A. London. Taylor and Francis, Red Lion Court, Fleet Street. 1855. Available online at Perseus Digital Library.
- Plato, pseudo-, First Alcibiades in Plato in Twelve Volumes, Vol. 8 translated by W.R.M. Lamb. Cambridge, MA, Harvard University Press; London, William Heinemann Ltd. 1955. Available online at Perseus Digital Library.
- Sacks, David; Murray, Oswyn; Brody, Lisa R., eds. (2005). Encyclopedia of the ancient Greek world. Infobase Publishing. ISBN 9781438110202.
- Stephanus of Byzantium, Ethnica edited by August Meineike (1790-1870), published 1849, partly translated by Brady Kiesling. Available online at Topos Text.
