= Cynurus =

Figure in Greek mythology

Cynurus (Ancient Greek: Κύνουρος, Kúnouros) was the son of the Greek hero Perseus.

According to the tradition he led colonists from Argos into Cynuria.
