= Argius =

Ancient Greek sculptor

Argius (Ancient Greek: Ἄργιος or Ἀργεῖος) was a sculptor of ancient Greece who was the disciple of Polykleitos, and therefore flourished about 388 BCE.

The 19th century classical scholar Friedrich Thiersch supposed that Pliny the Elder, in the words "Argius, Asopodorus," mis-translated his Greek authority, which had Ἀργεῖος Ἀσωπόδωρος, or "Asopodorus the Argive." But "Argius" is found as a Greek proper name in both the forms, Ἄργιος and Ἀργεῖος.
