= Sthenelus (son of Perseus) =

King of Tiryns and Mycenae from Greek Mythology

In Greek mythology, Sthenelus (Ancient Greek: Σθένελος, Sthenelos, "strong one, forcer"; derived from sthenos, "strength, might, force") was a king of Tiryns and Mycenae, and the son of Perseus who founded the latter city.

== Family ==
According to the mythographer Apollodorus, Sthenelus was the son of the Greek hero Perseus and the Ethiopian princess Andromeda, and the brother of Perses, Alcaeus, Heleus, Mestor, Electryon, and Gorgophone. By Nicippe, sister of Atreus and Thyestes, Sthenelus became the father of Eurystheus, Alcyone and Medusa (Astymedusa).

== Mythology ==
Sthenelus exiled his nephew Amphitryon, born to his brother Alcaeus, from Mycenae for having murdered Electryon, Sthenelus' other brother. (Amphitryon was also the husband of his niece, Alcmene, and she joined him in his exile.) As heir, Sthenelus was the successor to the throne of Mycenae, and was succeeded by his son Eurystheus, born to him and his wife Nicippe. According to the Roman mythographer Hyginus, Sthenelus was killed by Hyllus, the son of Heracles and Deianira.

== Notes ==
Preceded by Electryon	King of Mycenae	Succeeded by Eurystheus
Preceded by Electryon	King of Tiryns	Succeeded by Eurystheus
