= Heleus =

Son of Perseus in Greek mythology

In Greek mythology, Heleus or Heleius (Ancient Greek: Ἕλειος), also Helios (Ἕλιος), was a Mycenaean prince.

== Family ==
According to the mythographer Apollodorus, Heleus was one of the sons of Perseus and Andromeda, and the brother of Perses, Alcaeus, Sthenelus, Electryon, Mestor, and Gorgophone.

== Mythology ==
Heleus accompanied his nephew Amphitryon, son of Alcaeus, on the expedition to Taphos, and after the victory shared the sovereignty of their domain with Cephalus.

The town Helos in Laconia was said to have been founded by and named after him.
