= Clash of the Titans (film series) =

Fantasy action film franchise

- Created by: Beverley Cross
- Original work: Clash of the Titans (1981)
- Owners: Warner Bros. Entertainment (Skydance)

Print publications
- Comics: Wrath of the Titans Volumes 1-4 (2007); Wrath of the Titans: Cyclops (2009); Clash of the Titans: Exclusive Prequel Comic (2011); Revenge of the Medusa Volumes 1-4 (2012)

Films and television
- Films: Clash of the Titans (1981); Clash of the Titans (2010); Wrath of the Titans (2012)

Games
- Video game: Clash of the Titans (2010)

Audio
- Soundtrack: Clash of the Titans (2010)

Clash of the Titans is an action fantasy film series and media franchise based on characters and myths of Ancient Greek mythology. The 1981 feature film Clash of the Titans was remade in 2010, spawning the 2012 sequel Wrath of the Titans. Following an initial announcement, the subsequent sequel Revenge of the Titans went undeveloped.

== Films ==
The series originates with Clash of the Titans in 1981. Before the era of CGI, this stop motion masterpiece is a throwback to the classic stop motion films of the 1950s and 60s. A concept for a sequel was proposed to MGM in 1984, but Force of the Trojans was never produced

The success of the 2010 Clash of the Titans remake prompted the sequel Wrath of the Titans. While Wrath of the Titans was still in post-production in November 2011, Warner Bros. hired Dan Mazeau and David Leslie Johnson to write a treatment for a third installment, Revenge of the Titans. By the spring of 2013 Sam Worthington said a third film was unlikely.

== Characters ==
| Character | Original film | Remake films | |
| Character | Clash of the Titans | Clash of the Titans | Wrath of the Titans |
| Character | 1981 | 2010 | 2012 |
|---|---|---|---|
| Perseus | Harry Hamlin | Sam Worthington | Sam Worthington |
| Andromeda | Judi Bowker | Alexa Davalos | Rosamund Pike |
| Zeus | Laurence Olivier | Liam Neeson | Liam Neeson |
| Poseidon | Jack Gwillim | Danny Huston | Danny Huston |
| Hephaestus | Pat Roach | Paul Kynman | Bill Nighy |
| Aphrodite | Ursula Andress | Agyness Deyn | |
| Athena | Susan Fleetwood | Izabella Miko | |
| Hera | Claire Bloom | Nina Young | |
| Stygian Witches | Flora Robson Anna Manahan Freda Jackson | Ross Mullan Robin Berry Graham Hughes | |
| Calibos | Neil McCarthy | Jason Flemyng | |
| Medusa | Stop-motion animated character | Natalia Vodianova | |
| Thetis | Maggie Smith | | |
| Orthrus | Stop-motion animated character | | |
| Hades | | Ralph Fiennes | Ralph Fiennes |
| Ares | | Tamer Hassan | Édgar Ramírez |
| Apollo | | Luke Evans | |
| Artemis | | Nathalie Cox | |
| Hermes | | Alexander Siddig | |
| Demeter | | Charlotte Comer | |
| Hestia | | Jane March | |
| Io | | Gemma Arterton | |
| Draco | | Mads Mikkelsen | |
| Sheikh Sulieman | | Ian Whyte | |
| Prokopion | | Luke Treadaway | |
| Agenor | | | Toby Kebbell |
| Heleus | | | John Bell |

== Crew ==
| Crew | Original film | Remake films | |
| Crew | Clash of the Titans (1981) | Clash of the Titans (2010) | Wrath of the Titans (2012) |
|---|---|---|---|
| Director | Desmond Davis | Louis Leterrier | Jonathan Liebesman |
| Producer | Ray Harryhausen & Charles H. Schneer | Basil Iwanyk, Kevin De La Noy & Richard D. Zanuck | Basil Iwanyk & Polly Cohen Johnsen |
| Screenplay | Beverley Cross | Phil Hay, Matt Manfredi & Travis Beacham | Dan Mazeau, Greg Berlanti & David Leslie Johnson |
| Composer | Laurence Rosenthal | Ramin Djawadi | Javier Navarrete |
| Editor | Timothy Gee | Martin Walsh & Vincent Tabaillon | Martin Walsh |
| Cinematographer | Ted Moore | Peter Menzies Jr. | Ben Davis |
| Running time | 118 minutes | 106 minutes | 99 minutes |

== Other media ==
=== Video game ===
In 2010, a video game based on the 2010 film was released for Xbox 360 and PlayStation 3 on July 27, 2010. The video game received negative reviews.

=== Comics ===
Bluewater Productions started the four-part spin-off comic book series Wrath of the Titans in 2007.

Set five years after the events of the 1981 film, Calibos escapes the underworld to take revenge against Perseus. A one-shot sequel titled Wrath of the Titans: Cyclops was released in 2009. Revenge of the Medusa was released as a four-part series in 2011.

== Reception ==
=== Box office performance ===
| Film | Release date | Box Office Revenue | | | Budget | Reference |
| Film | Release date | United States | International | Worldwide | Budget | Reference |
|---|---|---|---|---|---|---|
| Clash of the Titans (1981) | June 12, 1981 | $41,092,328 | | $41,092,328 | $15,000,000 | |
| Clash of the Titans (2010) | April 2, 2010 | $163,214,888 | $330,000,000 | $493,214,888 | $125,000,000 | |
| Wrath of the Titans | March 30, 2012 | $83,670,083 | $221,600,000 | $305,270,083 | $150,000,000 | |
| Total gross revenue | | $287,977,299 | $551,600,000 | $839,577,299 | $290,000,000 | |

=== Critical and public reaction ===
| Film | Rotten Tomatoes | Metacritic | CinemaScore |
|---|---|---|---|
| Clash of the Titans (1981) | 63% (49 reviews) | 59% (9 reviews) | —N/a |
| Clash of the Titans (2010) | 27% (265 reviews) | 39% (37 reviews) | B |
| Wrath of the Titans | 26% (175 reviews) | 37% (32 reviews) | B+ |
