= 99.9 (film) =

- Theatrical release poster
- Directed by: Agustí Villaronga
- Written by: Lourdes Iglesias; Jesús Regueira; Agustí Villaronga
- Starring: María Barranco; Terele Pávez; Ruth Gabriel
- Cinematography: Javier Aguirresarobe
- Music by: Javier Navarrete
- Production companies: Origen; Impala
- Distributed by: Buena Vista International
- Release date: 1997 (Sitges Film Festival)
- Running time: 110 minutes
- Country: Spain
- Language: Spanish

99.9 (Spanish: 99.9: La frecuencia del terror, lit. '99.9: The Frequency of Terror') is a 1997 Spanish horror film directed and co-written by Agustí Villaronga. The film stars María Barranco as Lara, the host of a radio show focused on psychic and paranormal phenomena, who learns that her ex-boyfriend has been found dead in a small Spanish village. When she travels to the village, she discovers that he had been performing experiments to connect with otherworldly spirits. The film's title has been described as referring to both the dial of a radio station and as an inversion of "666" (the "number of the beast").

Cinematographer Javier Aguirresarobe served as director of photography on 99.9, and composer Javier Navarrete provided the score. The film screened at the 1997 Sitges Film Festival, where it won the festival's award for Best Cinematography.

== Cast ==
- María Barranco as Lara
- Terele Pávez as Dolores
- Ruth Gabriel as Julia
- Ángel de Andrés López as Lázaro
- Gustavo Salmerón as Víctor
- Ángel de Andrés López as Lázaro
- Luisa Gavasa as Luisa
- Simón Andreu as Simón

== Home media ==
In 2021, a 2K restoration of the film was released on Blu-ray and DVD by the Cult Epics label.
