= Richard Davalos =

American actor (1930–2016)

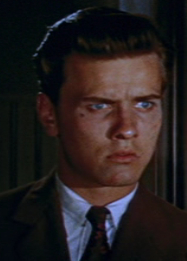
- Davalos in East of Eden (1955)
- Born: November 5, 1930; The Bronx, New York City, U.S.
- Died: March 8, 2016 (aged 85); Burbank, California, U.S.
- Occupation: Actor
- Years active: 1953–2008
- Spouse: Ellen Van Der Hoeven
- Children: Elyssa Davalos; Dominique Davalos
- Relatives: Alexa Davalos (granddaughter)

Richard Davalos (November 5, 1930 – March 8, 2016) was an American stage, film, and television actor.

== Early life ==
Davalos was born in The Bronx, New York City of Spanish and Finnish descent. At age six, he acted in a school performance of Cinderella, in which he played both the talking mirror and the prince.

== Career ==
Davalos appeared in East of Eden (1955) as James Dean's brother Aron and portrayed the convict Blind Dick in Cool Hand Luke (1967). His other film credits include roles in I Died a Thousand Times (1955); All the Young Men (1960); The Cabinet of Caligari (1962); Pit Stop (1969); Kelly's Heroes (1970); Brother, Cry for Me (1970); Hot Stuff (1979); Death Hunt (1981); Something Wicked This Way Comes (1983) and Ninja Cheerleaders (2008).

He won the 1956 Theatre World Award for his performances in the Arthur Miller plays A View from the Bridge and A Memory of Two Mondays.

In a 1960 episode of the drama Bonanza, Davalos played a young man planning to kill his father, a sheriff who had sent him to prison. In the American Civil War television series, The Americans, broadcast by NBC in 1961, he played Jeff, the younger brother who joined the Confederate Army, in opposition to Ben, the older brother, played by Darryl Hickman, who joined the Union Army. In 1962, Davalos appeared on Perry Mason as James Anderson in "The Case of the Hateful Hero". In 1964, he appeared in "The Case of the Ice-Cold Hands". He guest-starred in an episode of the espionage drama series Blue Light in 1966.

== Personal life and death ==
Davalos is the father of actress Elyssa Davalos and musician Dominique Davalos, and grandfather of actress Alexa Davalos (The Chronicles of Riddick).

An image of Davalos appears on the covers of The Smiths' albums Strangeways, Here We Come, Best...I, and ...Best II.

Davalos died at the St. Joseph Medical Center in Burbank, California, on March 8, 2016, at the age of 85.

== Filmography ==
List of acting performances in film and television
Year	Title	Role	Notes
1955	East of Eden	Aron Trask	
1955	The Sea Chase	Cadet Walter Stemme	
1955	I Died a Thousand Times	Lon Preisser	
1960	All the Young Men	Private Casey	
1960	Bonanza	Sam Jackson / Johnny Logan	"The Trail Gang"
1961	Hawaiian Eye	Mickey Martin	"A Touch of Velvet" (season 2, episode 18)
1961	The Americans	Corporal Jeff Canfield	TV series (all episodes)
1962	The Cabinet of Caligari	Mark Lindstrom	1963
1962	Perry Mason	James Anderson	TV series (season 6, episode 5)
1964	Perry Mason	Rodney Banks	TV series (season 7, episode 16)
1965	Rawhide	Will Butler	TV series (season 7, episode 24)
1966	Blue Light	Captain Hegner	TV series (season 1, episode 6)
1967	Cool Hand Luke	Dick "Blind Dick"	
1968	The Rat Patrol	Captain Wansee	TV series (season 2, episode 51)
1969	Pit Stop	Rick Bowman	
1970	Kelly's Heroes	Private Gutowski	
1970	Brother, Cry for Me	Michael Noble	
1971	Blood Legacy	Johnny Dean	
1976	The Rockford Files	Asthmatic Henchman (billed as Dick Davalos)	"Foul on the First Play" (season 2, episode 21)
1977	Hawaii Five-O	Hawley	"A Capitol Crime"
1979	Hot Stuff	Charles	
1980	Battle Beyond the Stars	Yago: Malmori	
1981	Death Hunt	Beeler	
1981	Hart to Hart	Spencer Krump	TV series (season 2, episode 10)
1983	Something Wicked This Way Comes	Mr. Crosetti	
2003	Between the Sheets	Mr. Little	
2008	Ninja Cheerleaders	Don Lazzaro	final film role
