= Marina Gatell =

Spanish actress

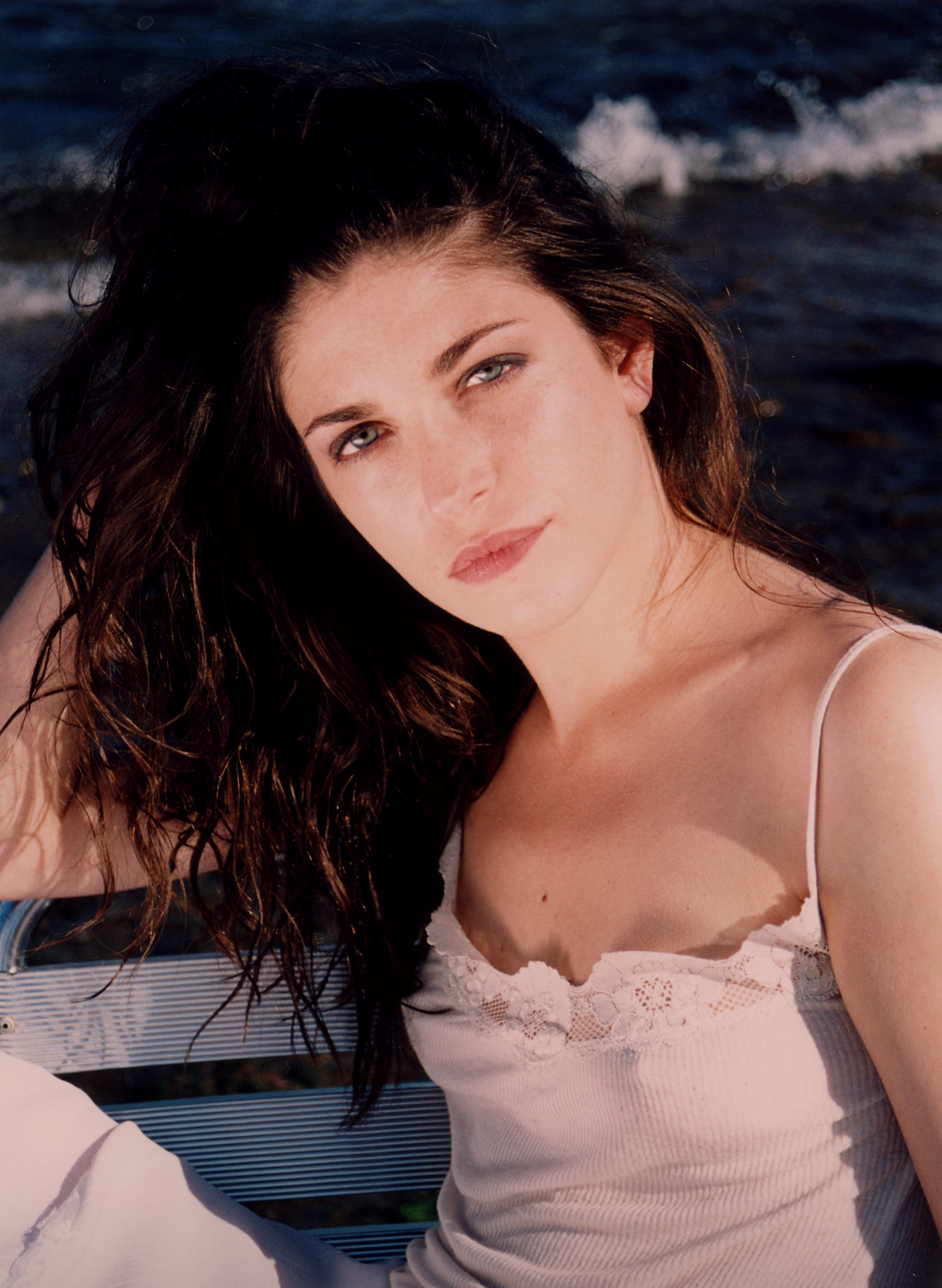
- Promotional image of Lalola
- Born: Marina Gatell Poch; July 11, 1979 (age 47); Sabadell, Catalonia, Spain
- Occupation: Actress

Marina Gatell Poch (b. Sabadell, Catalonia, Spain; July 11, 1979) is a Spanish actress.

== Biography ==
The daughter of a theater director, Marina spent her childhood in the town of Monistrol de Calders (Barcelona) and studied at the Theater Institute in Barcelona under Professor Nancy Tuñón, in addition to completing her training with courses in singing, dance, music theory, and piano.

She began her acting career with sporadic roles in both local and national television series. Her first recurring role was in the Telecinco comedy series 7 vidas, where she played Esther.

From 2002 to 2004, he starred in the sitcom Majoria Absoluta, a TV3 comedy that follows the adventures of a large family alongside Emma Vilarasau and Jordi Bosch. He then appeared in several TV movies such as Mintiendo a la vida, Crusader, Mobbing, and the Italian film I figli strappati.

In 2006, he appeared in the film Va ser que nadie es perfecto and joined the series El mundo de Chema on Cuatro (TV channel). Later, he appeared in series such as MIR and Ventdelplà.

In 2008, her fame grew exponentially when she starred in the Antena 3 (Spanish TV channel) comedy series Lalola alongside Octavi Pujades, where she played Lola Padilla.

In 2010, she joined the cast of the fifth season of Antena 3 (Spanish TV channel) series Física o Química, where she played Sandra. That same year, she also appeared in the film Pa Negre, which won nine Goya Awards (including Best Film), playing Enriqueta. In October, she appeared in the two-part miniseries Felipe y Letizia, which tells the love story of the current Spanish monarchs, playing Telma Ortiz Queen Letizia of Spain sister.

In 2011, she starred in three different TV movies. In February, she took part in TV3's period drama Ermessenda, a film that tells the story of Ermesinde of Carcassonne (Countess of Barcelona, Gerona, and Osona), a woman who ruled for sixty years in a man's world. In June, she starred in La Trinca: biografía no autorizada, a film that recounts the rise of the popular Catalan musical group La Trinca. Finally, in September, TV3 premiered the television adaptation of the play Terra baixa, in which Gatell played the lead role of Marta.

In 2012, she starred in the award-winning miniseries Carta a Eva, which tells the story of the relationship between Eva Perón, Juana Doña, and Carmen Polo, Franco's wife. In 2013, she was part of the cast of Joaquín Oristrell's film Volare, a comedy about dreams in which she shared the spotlight with Joel Joan and Úrsula Corberó.

In 2014, she was part of the cast of the Spanish adaptation of Federico Moccia's best-selling novel Perdona si te llamo amor (Sorry if I Call You Love). She also appeared in the film Rastros de Sándalo (Traces of Sandalwood) directed by Anna Soler-Pont. She also appeared in the last three episodes of the TV3 series 39+1, where she played Lola, the sister of the main character.

Since 2016, she has been part of the recurring cast of TV3's afternoon series La Riera, playing the role of Griselda.

== Filmography ==
=== Feature films ===
- 2023, The Cuckoo's Curse
- 2021, Two
- 2019, Born a King
- 2010, Maximum Shame
- 2010, Pa Negre
- 2009, Little Ashes
- 2008, Intrusos (en Manasés)
- 2007, The Ungodly
- 2006, Va a ser que nadie es perfecto
- 2003, Cocó
- 2002, Lisístrata
- 2000, Nosotras

=== TV ===
- 2021, La cocinera de Castamar
- 2010, Física o química
- 2008 - 2009, Lalola
- 2008, Zoo
- 2007, Ventdelplà
- 2007, Després de la pluja
- 2007, MIR
- 2006, El Mundo de Chema
- 2006, Mobbing
- 2006, I figli strappati
- 2005, Lo Cartanyà
- 2005, Viure de mentides
- 2002-2004, Majoria absoluta
- 2004, Crusader
- 2003, Fragments
- 2001, Hospital Central
- 2000, 7 vidas
- 2000, Tres en joc
- 1999, Pepe Carvalho
