= Carta a Eva =

Spanish television series

- Genre: Historical fiction
- Screenplay by: Agustí Villaronga; Alfred Pérez; Roger Danès
- Directed by: Agustí Villaronga
- Starring: Julieta Cardinali; Ana Torrent; Nora Navas; Jesús Castejón; Carmen Maura
- Country of origin: Spain
- Original language: Spanish
- No. of seasons: 1
- No. of episodes: 2

Production
- Production companies: TVE; TV3; Copia Cero

Original release
- Network: La 1
- Release: 30 May – 6 June 2013

Carta a Eva is a two-part Spanish television miniseries directed by Agustí Villaronga, starring Julieta Cardinali, Ana Torrent and Nora Navas. It originally aired on La 1 in 2013.

== Premise ==
The fiction deals about how the lives of three different women—Eva Perón (first lady of Argentina), Carmen Polo (Francisco Franco's wife) and Juana Doña (a communist militant)—intertwine during the official visit paid by the first one to Spain in 1947, when the country was internationally isolated and the population starving.

== Cast ==
Main

- Julieta Cardinali as Eva Perón.
- Ana Torrent as Carmen Polo.
- Nora Navas as Juana Doña.
- Jesús Castejón as Franco.
- Carmen Maura as Paca, Juana Doña's mother.

Supporting

- Malena Alterio as Lilian.
- Héctor Colomé as Juan Perón.
- Laura Prats as Carmencita Franco.
- Marina Gatell as Valia.
- Julián Soler as Alexis.
- Rubén Ochandiano as Manolo.
- María Isasi as funcionaria prisión.
- Lydia Zimmermann as Ana de Pombo.
- Marcel Borràs as Genaro.
- Fermí Reixach as Pacón.
- Pepa Charro, "La terremoto de Alcorcón" as Marquise of Huétor.
- Carlos Fuentes as jefe de policía.
- Andrés Herrera as cura prisión.
- Mingo Ràfols as párroco nuncio.
- Iván Morales as policía de paisano.
- Bruno Bergonzini as Ramón

== Production and release ==
It was co-produced by TVE, TV3 and Copia Cero. Filming took place in Barcelona. Directed by Agustí Villaronga, the screenplay was authored by Villaronga together with Alfred Pérez and Roger Danès. The miniseries was pre-screened at the San Sebastián International Film Festival. The two parts were released by Televisión Española from 30 May to 6 June 2013, earning average viewership figures of 2,666,000 viewers and a 14% audience share.

Series	Episodes	Originally released			Average viewership	Share (%)	Ref.
Series	Episodes	First released	Last released	Network	Average viewership	Share (%)	Ref.
1	2	30 May 2013	6 June 2013	tve	2,666,000	14	

== Awards and nominations ==
Year	Award	Category	Nominee(s)	Result	Ref.
2013	26th Festival International de Programmes Audiovisuels	Best Screenplay	Agustí Villaronga, Alfred Pérez & Roger Danès	Won	
2013	26th Festival International de Programmes Audiovisuels	Best Actress	Julieta Cardinali	Won	
2013	53rd Monte-Carlo Television Festival	Best Miniseries		Won	
2013	53rd Monte-Carlo Television Festival	Best Actress	Julieta Cardinali	Won	
2014	6th Gaudí Awards	Best TV Movie		Won	
