= Rhiana Griffith =

Australian actress

- Born: Rhiana Jade Griffith; 1985 (age 40–41); Mulbring, New South Wales, Australia
- Occupations: Actress, artist
- Years active: 1998–2005
- Height: 175 cm (5 ft 9 in)
- Children: 1

Rhiana Jade Griffith (born 1985) is an Australian former actress and artist.

== Early life ==
Griffith was born in 1985 in Mulbring, New South Wales, Australia.

== Career ==
Griffith got her first guest-starring role on the Australian medical drama Children's Hospital, and won her first film role, as Mercia in the 1998 film 15 Amore. Shortly thereafter, she won Model Quest 98's Grand Final for the 12–15 division, and was cast as Jack in the science fiction film Pitch Black, a role for which she had to shave off her hair.

Griffith continued to act throughout her teenage years, balancing her career with schooling. She starred in Desperately Seeking Brandi, a short film that was broadcast on the Nike website to coincide with the 2000 Sydney Olympic games. Her costars in the film were Brandi Chastain and Oliver Ackland. That same year, she was also a guest-star on the Australian comedy TV series BackBerner.

In 2001, she starred in the short film Search by director Hannah Hilliard. In 2002, she did a three-month guest-star stint on the popular Australian soap opera Home and Away and then guest-starred on an episode of the crime drama White Collar Blue. 2003 saw her appearing in a music video by rocker Ben Lee, called "Running With Scissors," directed by Nash Edgerton.

In 2004, she reprised her role as Jack from Pitch Black in the animated short film The Chronicles of Riddick: Dark Fury. She also auditioned to play the role in the feature film sequel to Pitch Black, The Chronicles of Riddick. Her casting was backed by producer and star Vin Diesel, but Griffith was told she had to "toughen up" for the role. Despite enlisting the aid of a kick-boxing trainer, she had only three weeks to prepare, and the role eventually went to Alexa Davalos.

2004 also saw Griffith embark upon her art career in earnest, with two major solo gallery showings. Her first, Chrysalis, was held at the Tighes Hill Gallery in Newcastle, Australia, in January 2004. Her second, A Month in Kaos, was held at the Surry Hills Cafe 249 art gallery in Sydney, Australia in May 2004. Griffith also acted in another short film, A Whole New You, and guest-starred in an episode of the Australian medical drama All Saints. As the year came to a close, Griffith portrayed Barbarella in print and television ads promoting the Flickerfest film festival.

In 2005, Griffith held her third art exhibition, a collaboration with her brother, poet Damien Griffith, called Sibling Revelry. In conjunction with the art show, they released a limited-edition book of their work, pairing her paintings with his poems. Griffith also contributed to a Wearable Art Festival, and will launch a line of clothing later in 2005. She is working on her second book, a children's book, for release in late 2005, and portrayed the starring role of Clare Newell in a short film, Wrong Answer, scheduled to be continued in the psychological thriller called Volunteer, to be directed by J. D. Cohen, aka Jon Cohen.

== Personal life ==
In 2009 Griffith gave birth to her daughter, Poppy.

== Filmography ==
=== Film ===
| Year | Work | Role | Type |
|---|---|---|---|
| 1999 | 15 Amore | Mercia | Feature film |
| 2000 | Pitch Black | Jack | Feature film |
| 2000 | Desperately Seeking Brandi | Bea | Short film (webcast) |
| 2001 | Search | May | Short film |
| 2004 | A Whole New You | Receptionist | Short film |
| 2005 | Wrong Answer | Clare Newell | Short film Winner of Judges' Choice: Short Film, Audience Choice: Short Film and Best of Fest at the 2005 Frankly Film Fest |

=== Television ===
| Year | Work | Role | Type |
|---|---|---|---|
| 1998 | Children's Hospital | Kelly | TV series, 1 episode |
| 2000 | BackBerner | Kristi Taylor | TV show, 1 episode |
| 2002 | White Collar Blue | Lilly Derwent | TV show, 1 episode |
| 2002 | Home and Away | Aimee Cooper | TV series |
| 2004 | All Saints | Cindy | TV series, 1 episode |
| 2004 | The Chronicles of Riddick: Dark Fury | Jack | Anime DVD |

=== Music videos ===
| Year | Work | Artist | Role | Type |
|---|---|---|---|---|
| 2003 | Running with Scissors | Ben Lee | Waitress | Music video |

=== TVC ===
| Year | Work | Role | Type |
|---|---|---|---|
| 2004 | Flickerfest | Barbarella | Advertising campaign |

== Art exhibitions ==
| Year | Work | Role | Type |
|---|---|---|---|
| 2004 | A Month in Kaos | Painter | Art exhibition |
| 2004 | Chrysalis | Painter | Art exhibition |
| 2005 | Sibling Revelry | Painter | Art exhibition |

== Sources ==
- The Blade Picture Company presents: Desperately Seeking Brandi
- New Film Media presents: A Whole New You
