= Clash of the Titans (2010 film) =

2010 action fantasy film directed by Louis Leterrier

- Theatrical release poster
- Directed by: Louis Leterrier
- Screenplay by: Travis Beacham; Phil Hay; Matt Manfredi
- Based on: Clash of the Titans by Beverley Cross
- Produced by: Basil Iwanyk; Kevin De La Noy; Richard D. Zanuck
- Starring: Sam Worthington; Gemma Arterton; Mads Mikkelsen; Alexa Davalos; Ralph Fiennes; Liam Neeson
- Cinematography: Peter Menzies Jr.
- Edited by: Vincent Tabaillon; Martin Walsh
- Music by: Ramin Djawadi
- Production companies: Legendary Pictures; The Zanuck Company; Thunder Road Pictures
- Distributed by: Warner Bros. Pictures
- Release date: April 2, 2010 (United States)
- Running time: 108 minutes
- Countries: United States; United Kingdom; Australia
- Language: English
- Budget: $125 million
- Box office: $493.2 million

Clash of the Titans is a 2010 action fantasy film and remake of the 1981 film of the same name produced by Metro-Goldwyn-Mayer (the rights to which had been acquired by Warner Bros. in 1996 through its purchase of Turner). The story is very loosely based on the Greek myth of Perseus. An international co-production between the United States, United Kingdom, and Australia, the film is directed by Louis Leterrier from a screenplay by Travis Beacham, Phil Hay, and Matt Manfredi, and stars Sam Worthington, Gemma Arterton, Mads Mikkelsen, Alexa Davalos, Ralph Fiennes, and Liam Neeson. The film was originally set for standard release on March 26, 2010, but it was later announced that the film would be converted to 3D and was released on April 2, 2010.

Clash of the Titans was a commercial success, grossing $493.2 million worldwide and becoming one of the highest-grossing films of 2010, but received generally negative reviews from critics, with praise for its epic scale, visual style and the performances of Neeson, Fiennes and Arterton, but criticism for Leterrier's direction, Worthington's performance and the post-production 3D conversion. The film's success led to a sequel, Wrath of the Titans, released in March 2012.

== Plot ==
During the gods' battle against the Titans, Hades created the Kraken, a fearsome monster that helped win the gods' victory. Zeus and his brothers then divided the world amongst themselves: Zeus took the skies, Poseidon the seas, and Hades, deceived by Zeus, was left to rule the Underworld.

Zeus later created the mortal humans, whose worship maintained the gods' immortality. Over time, however, some mortals began to defy their creators. When the human king Acrisius leads a siege at Mount Olympus, Zeus has sex with his wife Danae, conceiving a demigod son, Perseus. Upon discovering this, an enraged Acrisius locks the queen and her newborn child in a chest and throws them into the sea. Zeus retaliates by striking the king with a lightning bolt, which severely deforms him. Perseus and the now-dead Danae are found by the fisherman Spyros, who raises the baby with his wife Marmara.

Eighteen years later, Perseus and his family watch as soldiers from the city of Argos destroy the statue of Zeus, declaring war on the gods. The soldiers are slaughtered by the Furies, who are controlled by Hades. Hades then destroys the family's fishing vessel; Spyros and his family drown, with Perseus as the only survivor.

Found by another group of soldiers, Perseus is brought before King Kepheus and Queen Cassiopeia, who are celebrating their campaign against the gods. While their daughter Princess Andromeda disapproves of her parents' rebellion, Cassiopeia furthers her boasts. The revelry is suddenly interrupted by Hades. He kills Cassiopeia by rapidly aging her, threatens to unleash the Kraken upon Argos in ten days unless Andromeda is offered to it as a sacrifice, and reveals Perseus's godly heritage. Perseus meets Io, a mysterious woman cursed with immortality, who confirms his origin.

Perseus, Io, and the King's Guard led by Draco journey to the Stygian Witches, seeking a way to defeat the Kraken. To help his son, Zeus tries to give Perseus a sword forged on Olympus, which he refuses. Soon after, they are attacked by the corrupted Acrisius, now known as Calibos, who is working for Hades. During the fight, Draco severs Calibos' hand, forcing him to retreat to a desert where the blood from his injury conjures giant scorpions which attack the group. They are rescued by a band of djinn, desert sorcerers who tame the remaining scorpions and lend their aid to Perseus and his group.

They arrive at the lair of the Stygian Witches, who are forced to reveal a weapon to defeat the Kraken: the head of the gorgon Medusa, who resides in the Underworld. Upon arrival, Perseus and his remaining companions enter Medusa's temple lair, while Io remains outside. Medusa kills everyone except Perseus, who finally manages to behead her by using the reflective underside of his shield to see her with his back turned. As they are leaving Medusa's lair, Calibos appears and fatally stabs Io. As Perseus and Calibos fight, Perseus picks up the Olympian sword and kills his opponent; Calibos' human form is briefly restored, and he begs Perseus not to become like the gods before he dies. As Io lies dying, she urges Perseus to save Andromeda and Argos.

The winged horse Pegasus arrives and takes Perseus back to Argos while Hades, having manipulated Zeus and the gods into earning their trust, releases the Kraken. Prokopion, a fanatical worshipper of Hades, and his followers take Andromeda to be sacrificed. Perseus arrives in time and exposes Medusa's head to the Kraken, which gradually petrifies and crumbles. Prokopion attempts to kill Perseus, but Kepheus intervenes, and both of them are then crushed by the Kraken's falling claw. Hades confronts Perseus, but the latter, invoking Zeus, hurls his sword at Hades, forcing him back to the Underworld.

Perseus rescues Andromeda, who asks him to rule Argos by her side as king, but he declines. Later Zeus appears before Perseus and offers to bring him to Olympus which he also refuses. Zeus, while disgruntled, accepts Perseus' choice and revives Io allowing them to be together.

=== Alternative ending ===
After defeating the Kraken and Hades, Andromeda falls into the sea and Perseus dives in to save her. When he reaches her, he embraces her with a passionate kiss, indicating that they have fallen in love. After reaching the shore and regaining consciousness, Perseus tells Andromeda that he will return. Getting on Pegasus, he flies to Mount Olympus and confronts Zeus, stating that he does not wish to be one of them. After slamming his sword into the gods' map and shattering the models of every living person, he flies on Pegasus over the sea, presumably back to Argos.

== Cast ==
- Sam Worthington as Perseus
  A fisherman who finds out he is a demigod, as the son of Zeus, king of the gods, and the mortal Danae.
  - Otto Farrant as young Perseus
- Liam Neeson as Zeus
  King of the gods, as well as the god of the sky, lightning and thunder. He created man but has become disappointed with their lack of respect.
- Ralph Fiennes as Hades
  God of the underworld and the dead, and Zeus' brother. Hades resents Zeus for appointing him as lord of the underworld and plots to destroy him.
- Gemma Arterton as Io
  A mortal woman who had refused the advances of a god and was cursed with agelessness. She has watched over Perseus and acts as his guide.
- Alexa Davalos as Andromeda
  A princess of Argos who is to be sacrificed to the Kraken after her mother foolishly boasts about Andromeda's beauty.
- Jason Flemyng as King Acrisius/Calibos
  A mortal king who led a revolt against the gods. As punishment, Zeus impregnated Acrisius' wife, Queen Danae, and turned Acrisius into the deformed creature Calibos. Acrisius' transformation into Calibos is not based on mythological sources and was inspired by the character from the original film.
- Mads Mikkelsen as Draco, captain of the royal guard of Argos, who accompanies Perseus.
- Natalia Vodianova as Medusa, the Gorgon whose head Perseus seeks as a weapon to defeat the Kraken.
- Luke Evans as Apollo
  God of archery, dance, music, truth, and prophecy. Defiant of Zeus releasing Hades on the humans, believing in another way.
- Liam Cunningham as Solon, an experienced soldier from Argos who accompanies Perseus.
- Hans Matheson as Ixas, a soldier from Argos who accompanies Perseus.
- Nicholas Hoult as Eusebios, a young and devout soldier from Argos who accompanies Perseus.
- Ashraf Barhom as Ozal, a hunter who joins Perseus' journey, brother to Kucuk.
- Mouloud Achour as Kucuk, Ozal's brother and a hunter who joins Perseus' journey.
- Ian Whyte as Sheikh Suleiman, leader of the Djinn humanoid sorcerers who live in the desert and use black magic to extend their lifespan. The Djinn do not appear in classical mythology, as they are from Arabic myths.
- Luke Treadaway as Prokopion, a doomsday prophet who urges the Argives to worship the gods.
- Ross Mullan, Robin Berry and Graham Hughes as the three Stygian Witches
- Pete Postlethwaite and Elizabeth McGovern as Spyro and Marmara, who find the infant Perseus and become his adoptive parents.
- Vincent Regan and Polly Walker as King Kepheus and Queen Cassiopeia, Andromeda's parents and the arrogant rulers of Argos.
- Rory McCann and Martin McCann as Belo and Phaedrus, two soldiers from Argos who initially accompany Perseus on his journey.
- Kaya Scodelario as Peshet, handmaiden to Princess Andromeda
- Danny Huston as Poseidon
- Alexander Siddig as Hermes

== Production ==
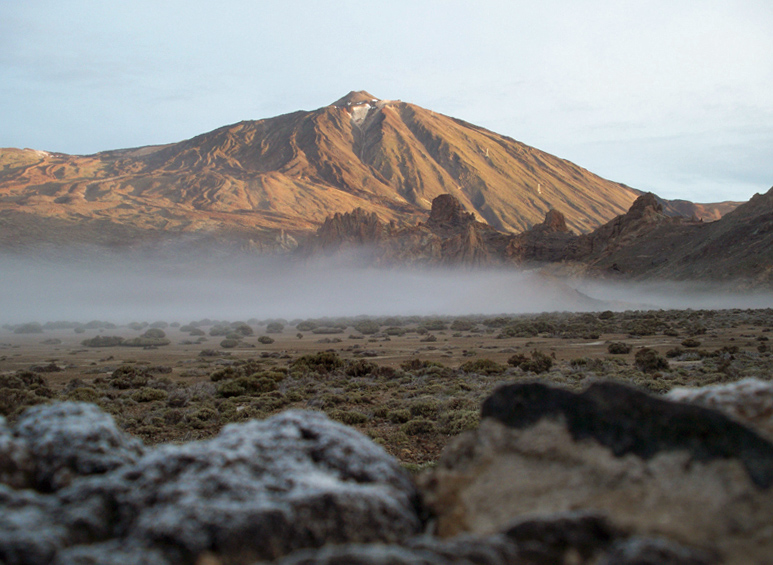
Teide National Park (Tenerife) is the most visited national park in Europe and one of the most visited in the world, and place of filming of some scenes from the movie.

The Clash of the Titans remake project started in 2002 under producer Adam Schroeder and writers John Glenn and Travis Wright. They wanted to drop the "cheesy chessboard manipulation of characters" by the gods. Wright and Glenn described their story as "an adventure film with religious elements". Producer Basil Iwanyk revived the project in 2006 with a rewrite by Travis Beacham, a fan of the original, who intended the script to be "darker and more realistic". Lawrence Kasdan and director Stephen Norrington signed on in 2007. Kasdan gave the script another rewrite from the Beacham version. But Norrington was unsure about his direction for the project because he did not grow up with the original. Leterrier, who did, contacted Norrington through their shared agent about replacing him. By June 2008 Leterrier joined the project and Warner Bros. greenlit the film. Leterrier noted the original Clash of the Titans inspired the climax of his previous film The Incredible Hulk – a battle in a burnt-down courtroom with temple-like columns – and has compared modern superheroes to Greek mythology.

Writers Phil Hay and Matt Manfredi took over the script during July 2008 and used Beacham's draft as a starting point. They focused on the mythology and telling the story through Leterrier's eyes. Hay and Manfredi had to rewrite the script in less than a year using a very active process. Leterrier sought Ray Harryhausen's involvement. He also reunited with Hulk concept artist Aaron Sims, who had already been working on Clash of the Titans with Norrington.

Louis Leterrier, during an interview, revealed that he is a big fan of Masami Kurumada's Saint Seiya manga (also known as Knights of the Zodiac) and its anime adaptation. He specifically cited the armor that the Gods wear in his film remake as a sign of homage and respect to Saint Seiya. Masami Kurumada, the author of Saint Seiya, was even asked to collaborate with the production team on poster designs.

Sam Worthington did not wear sandals while filming; he instead painted toes on his sports shoes so he could perform the stunts better.

According to actress Emma Thompson, she almost made an accidental uncredited cameo in the film while visiting her friend Liam Neeson on the set. Thompson, who had been filming Nanny McPhee and the Big Bang in an adjacent studio, went to visit Neeson during a break, just as Neeson was about to shoot a scene with Ralph Fiennes and Danny Huston. Unable to exit the set fast enough as the cameras began to roll, Thompson, in her clumsy Nanny McPhee costume, had to hide behind Huston's throne during the take so she would not be picked up by the cameras.

For the 2D to 3D conversion, Leterrier approached the studio early on about a 3D conversion, but it was expensive and very new technology. After Avatar, the studio put pressure on Leterrier to convert the film. He was worried because of his previous concerns but was convinced after seeing the View-D conversion process. Leterrier considered the 3D conversion to improve the viewing experience, and states that it should not be seen as a gimmick. In 2013, however, Leterrier called the 3D conversion "famously rushed and famously horrible" and "a gimmick to steal money from the audience".

=== Filming locations ===
Filming began April 27, 2009, near London, at Shepperton Studios, and also at Pinewood Studios and at Longcross Studios, near Chertsey, in Surrey. Filming also took place in Wales, the Canary Islands (Spain) (primarily at the World Heritage Site, Teide National Park in Tenerife), Maspalomas Dunes, Gran Canaria, and Timanfaya National Park in Lanzarote. Aerial photography was conducted in Iceland and Ethiopia.

Filming of volcano scenes at the Harriet hole in Dinorwic Slate Quarry in Wales wrapped at the end of July. This slate quarry has also been used for locations for Willow and Street Fighter.

== Release ==
Clash of the Titans was originally set for standard release on March 26, 2010. The Heat Vision Blog reported on January 27, 2010, that after a 3D conversion test of the film, which Warner Bros. found to be a "roaring success", the film would be converted to 3D and would premiere on April 2, 2010. The national premiere in Spain took place on March 30 in Santa Cruz de Tenerife, the capital city of the Canary Islands.

=== Critical reception ===
Review aggregator website Rotten Tomatoes reports that 27% of critics have given the film a positive review based on 265 reviews; the average rating is 4.3/10. The website's critical consensus states, "An obviously affectionate remake of the 1981 original, Louis Leterrier's Clash of the Titans doesn't offer enough visual thrills to offset the deficiencies of its script." On Metacritic, the film was assigned a weighted average score of 39 out of 100, based on 37 reviews from mainstream critics, indicating "generally unfavorable" reviews. Audiences polled by CinemaScore gave the film an average grade of "B" on an A+ to F scale. Even before release, the film attracted some negative attention for its original tagline, "Titans Will Clash", although the trailers, edited to match "The Bird and the Worm" by The Used, were praised. Most criticism was directed at the 3D conversion, the screenplay, Louis Leterrier's direction, and Sam Worthington's performance, while the effects and supporting cast were praised.

In his review for the Chicago Sun-Times, Roger Ebert gave the film three stars out of four, stating "I don't say it's good cinema, although I recognize the craftsmanship that went into it. I don't say it's good acting, when the men have so much facial hair they all look like Liam Neeson. I like the energy, the imagination, the silliness." Richard Corliss of Time could understand why the film received negative reviews, but found it "a full-throttle action-adventure, played unapologetically straight." He dismissed other critics' complaints, writing that the film is "very watchable in 2-D," that other critics were influenced by nostalgia for the original, and that 15 seconds of Bubo is enough for his tastes. Colin Covert gave the film a mildly positive review, stating the film was "all flash, trash, and crash," "a tasty hunk of baloney," and "mindless yet shamelessly thrilling." He said Worthington had a "Shatneresque heaviness about him," and found that all the laughs came from the fact that the heavyweight actors were "slumming through their roles." Owen Gleiberman of Entertainment Weekly gave the film a B−, writing "The new Clash isn't a cynical rehash. It has the flavor of a certain pre-CGI innocence." James Berardinelli gave it a mixed review, concluding that "Clash of the Titans is a flawed but mildly entertaining regurgitation of Greek mythological elements, but it's also an example of how poorly executed 3D can hamstring a would-be spectacle."

Peter Travers of Rolling Stone awarded the film one star out of four, stating "The film is a sham, with good actors going for the paycheck and using beards and heavy makeup to hide their shame." In a review for the Chicago Tribune, Turan complained that the film is worse in 3D; he went on further to explain that the action scenes are "more of a distraction than an enhancement", with the battle scenes being cluttered and "harder to follow rather than exciting". Claudia Puig for USA Today wrote that the film's "most outstanding achievement is the ability to be both chaotic and dull". Justification for her opinion came from the frantic action sequences and muddled special effects. Dan Kois blamed the director for making a "muddled disappointment" instead of a "camp classic that could have endured for generations." He also accused Leterrier of not knowing how to direct an action scene, and that the film lacked "wit and flair." David Stratton also criticized the film's action scenes, suggesting to Leterrier: "check out your local video store for something by Kurosawa, or almost any movie with sword fight scenes, to see how it's done."

=== Accolades ===
At the 2010 Teen Choice Awards, Clash of the Titans received four nominations (including Choice Movie – Fantasy). It was nominated for the Annie Award for Outstanding Achievement for Character Animation in a Live Action Production and the Alliance of Women Film Journalists' Time Waster Remake or Sequel Award. The film received nominations for Worst Prequel, Remake, Rip-off or Sequel and Worst Eye-Gouging Misuse of 3D at the 31st Golden Raspberry Awards. At the 37th Saturn Awards, the film received a nomination for Best Fantasy Film. It placed one of the Top Box Office Films at the 2011 ASCAP Awards.

=== Box office ===
Clash of the Titans earned $61,235,105 in its opening weekend in 3,777 theaters in the United States and Canada (not including Thursday previews). The movie was #1 for two weeks in a row, edging out Date Night and the previous winner, How to Train Your Dragon. The film held the record for having the highest April opening weekend for a Warner Bros. film until 2025 when A Minecraft Movie surpassed it. Clash of the Titans made $163,214,888 domestically, as of July 22, 2010, and $330,000,000 overseas, as of September 19, 2010, for a worldwide total of $493,214,888. On the all-time worldwide chart it ranks 80th and in North America it is below #100.

=== Home media ===
Clash of the Titans was released on DVD and Blu-ray combo pack on July 16 (Mexico), July 26 (UK), July 27 (USA) and (Canada), October 6 (Japan), 2010. A 3D Blu-ray version of the film was also released in a combo pack with the 2D version, DVD, and digital copy.

== Video game ==
Namco Bandai Games and Warner Bros. Interactive Entertainment released a video game adaptation of the movie on July 27, 2010, on PlayStation 3 and Xbox 360, to coincide with the film's home video release; it was originally planned for release in March 2010.

== Sequel ==
Production of the sequel, Wrath of the Titans, directed by Jonathan Liebesman, began on March 23, 2011. Sam Worthington, Ralph Fiennes and Liam Neeson reprised their roles and the film was released on March 30, 2012.

In November 2011, Warner Bros. hired Dan Mazeau and David Leslie Johnson, who wrote Wrath of the Titans, to write and develop a sequel, Revenge of the Titans, but it was cancelled.

== Internet meme ==
The phrase "Release the Kraken!", said by Liam Neeson's character Zeus in film trailers, became an Internet meme. Time listed it as one of the top 10 buzzwords of the year. Among supporters of Donald Trump the phrase has come to refer to the unfounded claim of voter fraud in the 2020 US Presidential Election.
