= Tolbukhin =

Tolbukhin can refer to:

- The former name of Dobrich, a Bulgarian town
- Fyodor Tolbukhin, Soviet military commander
- Aro Tolbukhin. En la mente del asesino, a 2002 Mexican-Spanish film
