= The Chronicles of Riddick: Dark Fury =

- UK DVD cover
- Directed by: Peter Chung
- Screenplay by: Brett Matthews
- Story by: David Twohy
- Based on: Characters created by Jim Wheat; Ken Wheat
- Produced by: John Kafka; Jae Y. Moh
- Starring: Vin Diesel; Rhiana Griffith; Keith David; Nick Chinlund; Tress MacNeille; Roger L. Jackson
- Music by: Tobias Enhus; Christopher Mann; Junkie XL
- Animation by: Sunwoo Entertainment; DNA Productions
- Production company: Universal Cartoon Studios
- Distributed by: Universal Studios Home Video
- Release date: June 15, 2004
- Running time: 35 minutes
- Country: United States
- Language: English

The Chronicles of Riddick: Dark Fury is a 2004 American anime-influenced adult animated science fiction short film distributed by Universal Studios Home Video and animated by Sunwoo Entertainment and DNA Productions. It was directed by Korean-American animator Peter Chung. It features the returning voices of Vin Diesel, Rhiana Griffith, and Keith David reprising their roles from Pitch Black, as Richard B. Riddick, Imam Abu al-Walid, and Jack, respectively. An animated installment to the Chronicles of Riddick series, the film acts as a bridge point between Pitch Black and The Chronicles of Riddick, the latter released on the same year, and explains why Riddick decides to go into hiding and deliver Jack and Imam Abu al-Walid to New Mecca, setting up the events for the second film.

The short film received mixed reviews.

== Plot ==
Shortly after escaping from the dark planet, Riddick, Jack, and the Imam are picked up by Kublai Khan, a private mercenary vessel. Although Riddick attempts to conceal his identity from the mercenaries by impersonating his former captor William J. Johns over the ship's radio, they quickly voice-print and identify him. The vessel's captain, Junner, assembles a crew of mercs to retrieve Riddick, who manages to get the drop on them by activating his ship's fire suppression system and using the foam as cover. After easily killing most of the mercs, Riddick surrenders when Jack is captured and held at gunpoint by Junner, but only after trying to call his bluff.

The trio of survivors discover that their captors have unusual plans for them. They are introduced to Antonia Chillingsworth (Tress MacNeille), who collects notorious criminals and keeps them in a state of suspended animation where they are still alive but are unable to speak or move. She explains that, in her view, this is both a fitting punishment and a way for said killers to be honored for what they are. She intends to do the same to Riddick, but first, she forces him to fight for Jack and Iman's lives by putting them in an arena with two "Shrills", bio-luminescent creatures that resemble parasitic jellyfish.

Riddick kills both creatures and uses his knife to extract an explosive planted in his neck by Junner to keep him in line; realizing his plan, Chillingsworth detonates the explosive, creating an exit for the trio to escape through. Fearing for her life, she angrily orders Junner to wake up more mercenaries, including a cunning merc by the name of Toombs, and also releases a dangerous carnivorous alien to hunt them. Riddick has Iman take Jack up to the flight deck and uses his own blood to trick the alien into slaughtering the pursuing mercs (except for Toombs, who manages to hide in a pipe). He then surprises and kills the alien.

Junner, anticipating Riddick's plan, knocks out Iman and tries to strangle Jack before Riddick confronts him. The two men are evenly matched in the fight until Riddick maneuvers Junner into severing a power cable with his sword, putting out the lights and giving Riddick an opening to stab Junner in the eye, killing him. A deranged Chillingsworth appears and is about to kill Riddick when Jack picks up Junner's rifle and shoots her in the head, blowing it off. As the trio leave on a dropship, Imam expresses concern that Jack will become exactly like Riddick if they continue to travel together. Riddick agrees and Riddick ultimately decides to leave them at New Mecca while he goes into hiding. Meanwhile, Toombs, having assumed command of Kublai Khan, sets off to capture Riddick for his bounty.

== Voice cast ==
- Vin Diesel as Richard B. Riddick
- Rhiana Griffith as Jack
- Keith David as Imam Abu al-Walid
- Tress MacNeille as Antonia Chillingsworth
- Roger L. Jackson as Junner
- Nick Chinlund as Toombs
- Dwight Schultz as Skiff A.I.
- Sarge as Escort Merc
- Julia Fletcher as Merc Squad Leader
- Hedy Burress as Lab Tech
- Andrew Philpot as Tech
- Rick Gomez as Lead Merc

== Home media ==
The Chronicles of Riddick: Dark Fury was officially released on DVD in the United States on June 15, 2004, by Universal Studios Home Video. The animated film was also officially released as part of the Riddick Trilogy DVD collection (alongside The Chronicles of Riddick: Pitch Black and The Chronicles of Riddick) on May 30, 2006.
