= The Sea (2000 film) =

El mar
- Theatrical release poster
- Directed by: Agustí Villaronga
- Written by: Antonio Aloy; Biel Mesquida; Agustí Villaronga
- Produced by: Isona Passola
- Starring: Roger Casamajor; Bruno Bergonzini; Antónia Torrens; Ángela Molina; Simón Andreu
- Cinematography: Jaume Peracaula
- Edited by: Raúl Román
- Music by: Javier Navarrete
- Release date: 14 April 2000
- Running time: 113 Minutes
- Country: Spain
- Language: Catalan

The Sea (Catalan: El mar) is a 2000 Spanish drama film directed by Agustí Villaronga, starring Roger Casamajor. It is based on a novel by Blai Bonet. The plot, set in Mallorca, follows the fates of three childhood friends traumatized by the violence they witnessed during the Spanish Civil War. Ten years later, they are reunited in a sanatorium for TB patients. The film won the Manfred Salzgeber Award at the Berlin International Film Festival.

== Plot ==
In the summer of 1936, the violence of the Spanish Civil war reaches a small village in Mallorca. Four children: Andreu Ramallo, Manuel Tur, Pau Inglada and a girl, Francisca, are witness to the execution of leftists at the hands of pro-Franco villagers. Pau, whose father has been killed the previous day by the lead executioner, plans to avenge his father's murder by torturing Julià Ballester, the son of his father's killer. His idea is to force the boy to drink castor oil. However, things go wrong when the boy, Julià Ballester, taunts them and Pau becomes enraged. He brutally kills Julià by bashing his head against a rock and then stabbing him in the throat. Unable to deal with what he has just done, Pau commits suicide by jumping down a hole into a cave. The remaining children, Andreu, Manuel, and Francisca, are witnesses to these tragic events.

Over a decade later, Ramallo, now a cocky young man, is sent to a tuberculosis sanatorium on Mallorca to recuperate from the initial stages of the disease. Ramallo, like all the tubercular and lung diseased patients, is placed in a large dormitory style room. However, as a patient's health dwindles and they are expected to die, they are sent to a private room numbered 13. Ramallo with his boastfulness and stories of sexual prowess attracts the admiration of the other patients, particularly from Galindo, the youngest.

Ramallo is surprised to find that Manuel Tur, his childhood friend, is also a patient. A pale and drawn man, Manuel has found solace for his illness in religion. Even more surprising is the sight of the beautiful Francisca, now a selfless nun, nursing the sick. Alcántara, the brutal caretaker and Carmen, his unhappy wife, run the place. Shortly after his arrival, Ramallo receives the unwanted visit of Don Eugeni Morell, his former boss, smuggling contraband. The well-to-do, middle-aged Morell has also sexually exploited him for a long time. Morell's visit makes Ramallo furious and he tries to disassociate himself from the crime lord, who has been funding him. As a reminder than he wants to count only on himself, Ramallo gets his own name tattooed on his chest by Alcántara. Manuel has a pet cat that he dotes on. In a fit of anger, Ramallo kicks the cat almost to death. Manuel gives the dying animal back to Ramallo to put it out of its misery. They bury the animal together and reconcile, remembering their childhood friendship.

Ramallo wants to cut his link to Morell for good but needs money to get away, but his first attempt—stealing some money from the church of the sanatorium—fails when he is discovered by Francisca. As a child, Francisca had a crush on Ramallo and now she is glad to see him again, but assures him that she is perfectly happy as a nun. Ramallo then starts scheming to hijack smuggled goods from Morell. He recruits Manuel in helping him to steal the keys of Alcántara's car in order to go to the nearby port. In the middle of this dealing, Galindo's death affects Ramallo deeply. Carmen has a soft spot for Manuel and tries to seduce him. At first, Manuel tries to resist because she is married, but she assures him that she is unhappy in her marriage and only feels disgust for her husband. They have sex, but when Manuel finds out that she came to visit him on Ramallo's suggestion, he tells her to leave him alone. Manuel angrily confronts Ramallo, accusing him of being jealous of his purity. Ramallo silences him by telling him that his anger is because he is secretly in love with Ramallo. In fact, attracted to his friend, Manuel steals Ramallo's clothes but, in his morbid religious fervor, fights his desires that he believes are diabolical. Manuel's sexual panic turns into self-inflicted stigmata.

Francisca accidentally discovers Ramallo's schemes but does not turn him in, instead she travels with Manuel to the cave in which Pau committed suicide in order to recover from it the items Ramallo stole from Morell. Ramallo escapes the sanatorium and returns to Morell's home. When Morell tells him that Manuel betrayed him, giving away the location of his purloined goods, Ramallo murders Morell with an axe. Ramallo returns to the sanatorium to take revenge on Manuel. Manuel tells Ramallo that he loves him and that he gave the goods to Morell to fight his attraction for him. Ramallo begins to rape him, claiming that the pleasure will torture Mauel for the rest of his life. Manuel plunges a knife into Ramallo's throat before slitting his own wrist. Francisca lays out the two bodies in the mortuary and removes her nun's coif.

== Cast ==
- Roger Casamajor - Ramallo
- Bruno Bergonzini - Manuel
- Antònia Torrens - Sister Francisca
- Hernán González - Galindo
- Juli Mira - Don Eugeni Morell
- Simón Andreu - Alcántara
- Ángela Molina - Carmen
- David Lozano - Manuel Tur
- Nilo Mur - Andreu Ramallo
- Tony Miquel Vanrell - Paul Inglada
- Victoria Verger - Francisca
- Sergi Moreno - Julià Ballester

== Home media ==
El mar is available on DVD. It was released in the United States on December 14, 2004, in Catalan with English and Spanish subtitles available.
