= In a Glass Cage =

1986 Spanish psychological horror film

- Theatrical release poster
- Tras el cristal
- Directed by: Agustí Villaronga
- Written by: Agustí Villaronga
- Produced by: Teresa Enrich
- Starring: Günter Meisner; Marisa Paredes; David Sust
- Cinematography: Jaume Peracaula
- Edited by: Raúl Román
- Music by: Javier Navarrete
- Production company: T.E.M. Productores S.A.
- Distributed by: Lauren films
- Release date: 1986
- Running time: 111 minutes
- Country: Spain
- Language: Spanish
- Box office: 31,624,135

In a Glass Cage (Spanish: Tras el cristal) is a 1986 Spanish psychological horror film written and directed by Agustí Villaronga, and starring Günter Meisner, Marisa Paredes, and David Sust. Inspired by the history of Gilles de Rais, the plot follows an ex-Nazi child molester who is now paralyzed and depending on an iron lung to live. A young man claiming to be his new caretaker reveals himself as one of the Nazi's former victims, and forces him to watch while he re-enacts his tormentor's crimes.

Due to themes mixing Nazism, pedophilia, torture, and homosexuality, the film was highly controversial. To celebrate the 30th anniversary of the Teddy Awards, the film was selected to be shown at the 66th Berlin International Film Festival in February 2016.

== Plot ==
Klaus, a former Nazi doctor, practiced horrific, sadomasochistic experiments on children during World War II. After the war, he goes into exile in a remote village in Catalonia, where he continues to rape and torture young boys. He kills his latest victim with a blow to the head, taking photographs of the crime. Angelo, one of Klaus' victims, spies on him from a window, and steals incriminating writings and photographs of the doctor's crimes. Klaus tries to commit suicide by jumping from a tower. He survives, but he is left paralyzed and unable to breathe on his own, confined permanently in an iron lung to survive.

Some years later, Klaus is being taken care of by his wife Griselda and their young daughter Rena in a large gloomy house in the country. Griselda is unhappy in Spain and, overwhelmed by the task of looking after her husband, secretly wishes he would just die. Angelo appears, offering his services as a nurse to help take care of Klaus. Griselda takes an instant dislike towards Angelo and does not want to hire him, but Klaus insists that he should stay. In reality, Angelo has no actual nursing skills, which Griselda soon discovers, but even then Klaus refuses to get rid of him. Angelo's true aim is revealed to be not only to take his revenge out on Klaus, but to ultimately take his place as a torturer. Angelo reads Klaus passages from the diaries he stole in which the doctor describes, in detail, how he tortured his victims. Recreating what Klaus did to him, Angelo strips and masturbates in front of Klaus. He then calls Griselda. She tries to run away, but he kills her, hanging her from the rails of the second floor.

The next day, Angelo fires the housekeeper, taking over the house with Rena's help. Rena is not disturbed by her mother's absence, as Griselda was abusive towards her. Rena feels far more comfortable under Angelo's care. Angelo continues with the doctor's experiments, bringing young boys to Klaus in his iron lung. Angelo lures a child to the house and ties him to a chair. In front of Klaus, Angelo kills the boy by injecting him through the heart with a needle filled with gasoline. He brings in another boy, forces him to sing and kills him by cutting his throat. Fearing that Angelo will kill him and Rena, Klaus tells his daughter to run away to the near village with a message asking for help.

Angelo discovers Rena while she is trying to escape and brings her back to the house. He dominates her, assuming a perverse, violent "parental" role. Finally Angelo removes Klaus from his iron lung and lets him die of asphyxiation while emulating the scene of his own abuse, in Rena's presence. Once Klaus is dead, Angelo takes his identity totally, getting into the artificial lung, and makes Rena take his.

== Cast ==
- Günter Meisner as Dr. Klaus
- David Sust as Angelo
  - Ricardo Carcelero as young Angelo
- Marisa Paredes as Griselda, Klaus's wife
- Gisèle Echevarría as Rena
- Imma Colomer as the housekeeper
- Alberto Manzano as gypsy child
- Josué Guasch as singing child

== Production ==
The film was the directorial debut of the Spanish filmmaker Agustí Villaronga. Made in 1985, In a Glass Cage was partially funded by subventions from the ministries of culture both of Spain and of the regional Catalan government. It was distributed by Barcelona based Lauren films. The "glass cage" of the film's title refers to the archaic iron lung which has become the home within a home for ex-Nazi Klaus after a suicide attempt. In a Glass Cage was inspired by the history of Gilles de Rais, a fifteenth-century French nobleman who murdered hundreds of children in sadistic black magic rituals, and was eventually convicted and hanged for his crimes.

== Reception ==
In a Glass Cage received generally positive reviews. Stephen Holden of The New York Times praised the film as "an elegant, unsettling first feature by the young Spanish writer and director Agustin Villaronga", "a revenge fantasy of the most icy viciousness." Cavett Binion of AllMovie called the film "stylistically compelling, morally ambiguous, and profoundly unsettling", but warned that it was "not for the faint of heart or weak of stomach". In a less positive review for The Washington Post, Desson Howe wrote that although the film "has a powerful style," its "intrinsic nastiness . . . brings it all crashing down."

On review aggregator website Rotten Tomatoes, the film holds an approval rating of 67% based on reviews from nine critics, with an average rating of 5.4/10.

== Controversy ==
In 1995, In a Glass Cage was submitted to the Australian Classification Board (ACB) by organisers of the Sydney Gay and Lesbian Mardi Gras festival. However, the film was refused classification, effectively banning it from being sold or exhibited in Australia. A DVD release of the film was similarly prohibited from release by the ACB in February 2005. In the United Kingdom, the film was never submitted for classification to the British Board of Film Classification (BBFC), likely out of fear that it would be banned.

== Home media ==
In a Glass Cage was released on DVD in the United States on 25 May 2004 by Cult Epics. The film is in Spanish with English subtitles. The bonus feature includes a brief interview with director Agustí Villaronga about the making of the film, the origins of the story, the stylistic use of color and location, and the acting. The film made its debut on Blu-ray Disc on 8 November 2011.
