= Jeff Dunas =

American photographer

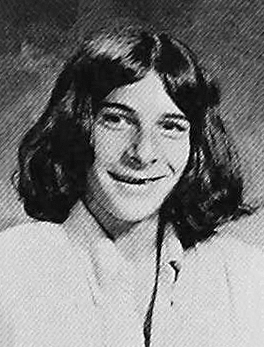
- Dunas in 1970
- Born: October 23, 1954 (age 71); Los Angeles, California, U.S.
- Occupation: Photographer
- Spouses: Elyssa Davalos (m. 1982; div. 1988): Laura Morton
- Children: Alexa Davalos

Jeffrey "Jeff" Dunas (born 1954) is an American photographer, known for his portraits of musicians and entertainers.

== Biography ==
Born in Los Angeles, the founder and publisher of photography magazines, he is also the founder and director of the Palm Springs Photo Festival. He is the father of actress Alexa Davalos.

== Photo books ==
- State of the Blues (Aperture 1998)
- American Pictures (Konemann & Aperture 2002)
- Up Close & Personal (Merrell 2003)
- ‘’Highway 61 to Honeyboy’’ (Nazraeli 2025)
