= Stormy Lola =

- Theatrical release poster
- Directed by: Agustí Villaronga
- Screenplay by: Mario Torrecillas; Agustí Villaronga
- Story by: Mario Torrecillas
- Starring: Susi Sánchez
- Edited by: Anabel Rodríguez Venzalá
- Production companies: Irusoin; Vilaüt Films; 3.000 obstáculos AIE
- Distributed by: Caramel Films/Youplanet Pictures
- Release date: 31 March 2023
- Country: Spain
- Language: Spanish

Stormy Lola (Spanish: Loli Tormenta) is a 2023 Spanish comedy film directed by Agustí Villaronga, which is his final film prior to his death and stars Susi Sánchez. A posthumously released swan song by Villaronga, it is also his first comedy feature.

== Plot ==
Set in the outskirts of Barcelona, the plot follows the plight of Lola, who suffers from a worsening condition of Alzheimer's disease and is in charge of her two grandchildren, Edgar and Robert. The latter, unwilling to go to a foster home, thereby decides to take care of their grandmother, concealing her disease.

== Cast ==
- Susi Sánchez as Lola
- Joel Gálvez
- Mor Ngom
- Maria Anglada Sellarés
- Celso Bugallo
- Fernando Esteso

== Production ==
The screenplay was penned by Mario Torrecillas and Agustí Villaronga based on an original story by Torrecillas. The film was produced by Irusoin, Vilaüt Films, and 3.000 obstáculos AIE, and it had the participation of RTVE, TV3, Movistar Plus+, and funding from ICAA and ICEC. It was shot in Barcelona in 2022. Villaronga suspended the chemotherapy of his ongoing cancer in order to shoot the film.

== Release ==
Loli Tormenta's distribution rights in Spain are handled by Caramel Films and Youplanet Pictures. The film was theatrically released in Spain on 31 March 2023. Villaronga died in January 2023, prior to the release.

== Accolades ==
Year	Award	Category	Nominee(s)	Result	Ref.
2024	16th Gaudí Awards	Best Director	Agustí Villaronga	Nominated	

== See also ==
- List of Spanish films of 2023
