= Ninja Cheerleaders =

- Directed by: David Presley
- Written by: David Presley
- Produced by: Christopher Roosevelt; Frank Desmarais
- Starring: George Takei; Trishelle Cannatella; Michael Paré
- Release date: 2008
- Country: United States
- Language: English

Ninja Cheerleaders is a 2008 comedy film written and directed by David Presley.

== Plot ==
A ninja sensei, Hiroshi, must be rescued by his three cheerleader/stripper students April, Courtney, and Monica from a mafia boss, Victor Lazzaro, and his evil ninja girlfriend Kinji.

== Cast ==
- Trishelle Cannatella as Courtney
- Ginny Weirwick as April
- Maitland McConnell as Monica
- George Takei as Hiroshi
- Michael Paré as Victor Lazzaro
- Michael Fitzgibbon as Red
- Larry Poindexter as Detective Harris
- Natasha Jai as Kinji
- Omar J. Dorsey as Manny
- Eric Stonestreet as Beergut
- Jason Ellis as himself
- Max Perlich as Jimmy the Snitch
- Richard Davalos as Don Lazzaro (last film appearance)

== Reception ==
In 2011, UGO Networks featured the film on their list of 25 Hot Ninja Girls, calling it "just an excuse for hot women to do martial arts". Filmdienst described it as a ”a cheap, completely trashy action comedy in which scantily clad women wield samurai swords”. In his review of the film, Christopher Armstead wrote, ”despite the ripe fertile ground for campy fun it held was ultimately a fairly large disappointment”.
