= Lydia Zimmermann =

Spanish actress

- Born: Lydia Martina Zimmermann Kuoni; 30 December 1966 (age 59); Barcelona, Catalonia, Spain
- Education: Centre d'Estudis Cinematogràfics de Catalunya (1994); University of Melbourne Faculty of VCA and MCM School of Film and Television (1996)
- Occupations: Academic; Activist; Actress; Author; Businesswoman; Cinematographer; Director; Editor; Screenwriter
- Years active: 1989–
- Employers: Artisan Films GmbH; Ciné Institute; Comicastros; Curtidas; Gebrüder Kuoni; European Film Actor School; Pompeu Fabra University; Ramuni Paniker Trust
- Known for: Filmmaking
- Notable work: Aro Tolbukhin. En la mente del asesino (2002)
- Style: Art film
- Movement: Late modernism
- Children: 1
- Parents: Yves Zimmermann (father); Bignia Silvia Zimmermann-Kuoni (mother)
- Awards: Best Director Award, St Kilda Short Film Festival, May 1995 (Wake); Special Mention of the Jury Award, Girona Film Festival, October 1995 (Wake); Best Film Award, Zinebi, December 1995 (Wake); Ariel a mejor guion original, Ariel Awards, April 2003 (Aro Tolbukhin. En la mente del asesino)
- Website: Lydia Zimmermann's Official Website

Lydia Martina Zimmermann Kuoni (born 30 December 1966) is a Spanish Catalan actress and film director.

== Biography ==
Lydia Zimmermann was born in Barcelona, Catalonia, the daughter of Swiss Yves Zimmermann, a graphic designer, and Bignia Silvia Zimmermann-Kuoni, an anthropologist and textile designer.

She studied film in VCA Melbourne, Australia, and has worked and filmed in Spain, Haiti, Burkina Faso, Myanmar, Colombia and Switzerland.

In addition, Zimmermann has taught at the European Film Actor School, at the Pompeu Fabra University Communication Department as an Associate Professor offering directing and screenwriting courses and presenting the works during conferences held at the Escola Superior de Cinema i Audiovisuals de Catalunya, as well as at the Ciné Institute in Jacmel, Haiti. She is one of the founders of the Zürich-based film production company Artisan Films GmbH, the cultural verein Kunstruktur and the Artists in Residency Curtidas. She has studied under Jonathan Demme, Lindsay Kemp, and Cesc Gelabert, directed Sergi Belbel's Después de la lluvia and a stage adaptation of Sergio Cabrera's film The Strategy of the Snail for the theatre group Comicastros, and has a M.A. at Zurich University of the Arts.

== Work ==
Zimmermann is probably best known for her directorial debut Aro Tolbukhin. En la mente del asesino (2002), codirected with Agustí Villaronga and Isaac Pierre Marcel Racine, in which she also had an uncredited cameo and for which she appeared, together with Racine and Villaronga, on Versión española, directed by Félix Piñuela and broadcast by Televisión Española, on 1 April 2005 and on Sala 33, directed by Àlex Gorina i Macià and broadcast by TV3, on 18 December 2010. She has also, among other activities, played the role of a caregiver in Agustí Villaronga's film Moon Child (1989), her acting debut, as well as the roles of a mourner in Antoni Aloy's 1999 film adaptation of the 1898 Henry James novella The Turn of the Screw titled Presence of Mind, a mother in Gemma Ventura's 2009 short film about Carl Jung The Jung Files and once again in the 2010 film Elisa K, directed by Jordi Cadena i Casanovas and Judith Colell, in which she appears among the acknowledged, and of Ana de Pombo in Agustí Villaronga's 2013 television series Carta a Eva broadcast by La 1. She appeared on 27 November 2014 on the television program Àrtic broadcast by Betevé. She codirected with Agustí Villaronga a television documentary titled Fe about and broadcast by RTVE as part of the series 50 años de on 10 December 2009, and worked as a camera operator during the production of Mariano Barroso's 1994 film Mi hermano del alma and the 2011 film Barcelona, abans que el temps ho esborri directed by Mireia Ros.

Zimmermann's video art, dealing with topics ranging from Andrei Tarkovsky's 1966 film Andrei Rublev, Blanca Portillo's incarnation of Mary during a stage adaptation of Colm Tóibín 2012 novel The Testament of Mary directed by Agustí Villaronga, the Cercle Artístic de Sant Lluc, and fashion designer Jesús del Pozo to Théodore Géricault's 1818–1819 painting The Raft of the Medusa as well as his other work, a 2012 homage to Maria Mercè Marçal titled Ferida arrel: Maria-Mercè Marçal and the personas of Elisabeth Kübler-Ross and Robert Capa, supported by the Consell Nacional de la Cultura i de les Arts and by Banco Sabadell, has appeared at the Centre d'Art Santa Mònica and at the Cercle Artístic de Sant Lluc. Two television films directed by her, La dona de gel (2003) and Perfecta pell (2005), were broadcast by RAI and TV3, and she has also written a screenplay based on Paul Auster's 1995 short story collection The Red Notebook titled Correspondencia. She was also listed in the acknowledgments in Antonio Chavarrías' film Volverás.

== Reception ==
In April 2003, Zimmermann, together with Villaronga and Racine, won the Premi Ariel al millor guió original and was nominated for the Ariel Award for Best Director at the Ariel Awards for Aro Tolbukhin. En la mente del asesino (2002). In January 2011, she was nominated for the Gaudí a la millor actriu secundària at the Gaudí Awards for her role in Elisa K (2010), and, in September 2002, she was nominated for the Golden Shell at the San Sebastián International Film Festival for Aro Tolbukhin. En la mente del asesino (2002). She appeared during the televised ceremony broadcast by TV3 and titled Premis Gaudí de 2011, directed by Joel Joan and Adrian Smith. A 1995 short film directed by her titled Wake also won the Best Director Award at the St Kilda Short Film Festival as well as the Best Film Award at the Zinebi and a Special Mention of the Jury Award at the Girona Film Festival.

== Bibliography ==
- Agustí Villaronga, Lydia Zimmermann, e Isaac Pierre Racine. Aro Tolbukhin. En la mente del asesino: Guión cinematográfico, Colección Espiral, Colección dirigida por Jesús Robles, 23. Madrid: Ocho y Medio Libros de Cine, 2002, 128 páginas (ISBN 9788495839237). (in Spanish)
