= Wrath of the Titans =

2012 action fantasy film directed by Jonathan Liebesman

- Theatrical release poster
- Directed by: Jonathan Liebesman
- Screenplay by: Dan Mazeau; David Leslie Johnson
- Story by: Greg Berlanti; David Leslie Johnson; Dan Mazeau
- Based on: Characters by Beverley Cross
- Produced by: Basil Iwanyk; Polly Cohen Johnsen
- Starring: Sam Worthington; Rosamund Pike; Bill Nighy; Édgar Ramírez; Toby Kebbell; Danny Huston; Ralph Fiennes; Liam Neeson
- Cinematography: Ben Davis
- Edited by: Martin Walsh
- Music by: Javier Navarrete
- Production companies: Legendary Pictures; Thunder Road Pictures; Cott Productions; Furia de Titanes II, A.I.E. (Note: A subsidiary of Telecinco Cinema, S.A.U. in Spain.)
- Distributed by: Warner Bros. Pictures
- Release dates: March 28, 2012 (France); March 30, 2012 (United States)
- Running time: 99 minutes
- Countries: United States; Spain
- Language: English
- Budget: $150 million
- Box office: $302 million

Wrath of the Titans is a 2012 action fantasy film and a sequel to the 2010 film Clash of the Titans. The film stars Sam Worthington, Rosamund Pike, Bill Nighy, Édgar Ramírez, Toby Kebbell, Danny Huston, Ralph Fiennes, and Liam Neeson, with Jonathan Liebesman directing a screenplay by Dan Mazeau and David Leslie Johnson from a story by them and Greg Berlanti. Wrath of the Titans takes place a decade after the events of the preceding film as the gods lose control over the imprisoned Titans (thanks to humanity's lack of prayers which also is draining their immortality) and Perseus is called, this time to rescue his father Zeus, overthrow the Titans, and save mankind.

Talk of a sequel began with the release of Clash of the Titans in March 2010. Writers Dan Mazeau and David Leslie Johnson were hired in June 2010 and director Jonathan Liebesman was brought on board in August 2010. The majority of the casting took place between January and February 2011. Principal photography began in London in March 2011. Like its predecessor, the film was converted to 3D in post-production.

Wrath of the Titans was released in 2D and 3D on March 30, 2012, in the United States. The film received mostly negative reviews from critics and grossed $302 million worldwide on a budget of $150 million. A sequel entitled Revenge of the Titans was planned for a 2013 release, but was cancelled due to Wrath's underperformance and too few ideas for a script.

== Plot ==
Ten years after defeating Hades' Kraken, Perseus, the demigod son of Zeus, now lives as a fisherman with his son Heleus, after the death of his wife Io. Zeus visits Perseus, warning him that, since humans stopped praying to them, the gods are losing their powers and becoming mortal. They can no longer sustain the walls of Tartarus which are holding back the imprisoned Titan Kronos. Perseus, valuing his family's safety, refuses to help.

Zeus meets his brothers Hades and Poseidon and his son Ares in Tartarus. He asks Hades for help in rebuilding Tartarus' walls, but Hades rejects the offer and attacks Zeus, as does Ares. Poseidon is fatally injured in the ensuing fight. Hades and Ares imprison Zeus, stealing his thunderbolt. They plan to make a deal with Kronos: in exchange for remaining immortal, they will drain Zeus' divine power to revive Kronos. The walls of Tartarus break, unleashing monsters onto the world.

After killing a two-headed Chimera in his village, Perseus decides to see Zeus. He instead finds a dying Poseidon who informs him of the situation and tells him to find his demigod son Agenor, who will lead him to Hephaestus, who knows the way into Tartarus. Poseidon then gives Perseus his trident and succumbs to his injuries. Perseus, Andromeda and Agenor set out to find Hephaestus on a hidden island.

Agenor explains that Hephaestus created three weapons which Zeus, Hades, and Poseidon wield: Zeus' thunderbolt, Hades' pitchfork, and Poseidon's trident, which can jointly form the Spear of Trium, the only weapon that can defeat Kronos. After an encounter with three Cyclopes, the travelers eventually meet the now-mortal Hephaestus and reach the entrance of a labyrinth leading to Tartarus. Hephaestus sacrifices himself during an attack by Ares to enable Perseus, Andromeda, and Agenor to enter the labyrinth. Inside the labyrinth, a Minotaur attacks Perseus, who kills it.

The group eventually enters Tartarus. Meanwhile, Zeus has been almost entirely drained of power as Kronos awakens. Zeus apologizes to Hades for banishing him to the underworld and asks his forgiveness, as he has forgiven Hades for his actions. Hades decides to help Zeus and stop Kronos in contrast to Ares. Perseus arrives and frees Zeus. Ares wounds Zeus with Hades' pitchfork, allowing Perseus to obtain it before he and the others escape Tartarus with Zeus.

Aiming to retrieve Zeus' thunderbolt from Ares in order to defeat Kronos, Perseus challenges him to a duel. Meanwhile, Andromeda's army is overwhelmed by the Makhai. Hades revives Zeus and together they defeat the creatures. Kronos appears and begins to attack Andromeda's army. Zeus and Hades hold off Kronos while Perseus duels Ares, eventually killing him with the thunderbolt. Combining the gods' weapons into the Spear of Trium, Perseus destroys Kronos by traveling to his heart and throwing the spear into it.

Zeus reconciles with Perseus and then dies of his wounds and Hades leaves, accepting mortality. Heleus tells his father that he wants to return to his life as a fisherman, but Perseus tells him they cannot, and encourages Heleus to be proud of himself, as he is the son of Perseus and the grandson of Zeus, with Perseus giving his sword to Heleus.

== Cast ==
- Sam Worthington as Perseus, the demigod son of Zeus, who defeated the Kraken and saved humanity; Zeus enlists Perseus' help in order to defeat the Titan Kronos. None of Perseus’ adventures in the film are based on mythological sources.
- Liam Neeson as Zeus, the king of the gods as well as the god of the sky, lightning and thunder. Also Perseus' father.
- Ralph Fiennes as Hades, the god of the Underworld and the dead. Hades is a brother of Zeus who resents his brother for deceiving him into being Lord of the Underworld.
- Rosamund Pike as Andromeda, who was saved by Perseus when she was a princess; now crowned Queen of Argos, she joins Perseus in his quest to defeat Kronos. Pike replaced Alexa Davalos in the role, due to a scheduling conflict. In classical mythology, Andromeda was a princess of Aethiopia, who marries Perseus after he saves her from the sea monster Cetus.
- Toby Kebbell as Agenor, the demigod son of Poseidon; he joins Perseus in his quest to defeat Kronos. The character is only very loosely based on the mythological Agenor, son of Poseidon and Libya, who was King of Tyre in Phoenicia.
- Bill Nighy as Hephaestus, god of metalworkers and blacksmiths who forged the weapons of the gods. He was called the "Fallen One" for taking Hades' side in a family dispute.
- Édgar Ramírez as Ares, the god of war and violence, who betrays his father Zeus to join Hades.
- Danny Huston as Poseidon, the god of the sea, Agenor's father. Huston had also played Poseidon in one scene in the previous film.

Lily James appears as Korrina, a female warrior from Argos, while Matt Milne plays another Argive soldier. Alejandro Naranjo plays the Argive general Mantius.

John Bell plays Helius, the young son of Perseus and Io. In classical Greek mythology, Helius was one of the sons of Perseus and Andromeda; not Io who lived hundreds of years before Perseus and was actually one of his ancestors.

Sinead Cusack plays the local healer and teacher Clea.

The Minotaur is performed by Spencer Wilding. Martin Bayfield portrayed the oldest of the three cyclopes through motion capture. The cyclopes are based on the mythological cyclopes Arges, Steropes, and Brontes, who assisted Hephaestes.

== Production ==
Talks of a sequel to Clash of the Titans began as early as March 2010. Tamer Hassan, who played Ares in the first film, stated at the film's world premiere that, "They want this one to do well so they can go ahead with the sequel, Return of the Gods". In April 2010 it was reported that director Louis Leterrier would not return to direct, but would be an executive producer on the second installment. The report also stated that Sam Worthington was on board and that Greg Berlanti would write the story.

In June 2010, Warner Bros. hired David Leslie Johnson and Dan Mazeau to write the screenplay, with Basil Iwanyk returning as the producer. It was announced that the sequel would be filmed in 3D, rather than being converted to 3D as the first film was. In August 2010, it was reported that Jonathan Liebesman had signed on as director.

In September 2010, Liebesman confirmed that Sam Worthington, Gemma Arterton, Ralph Fiennes, and Liam Neeson would be returning. However, Arterton did not reprise her role for unknown reasons, leaving her character, Io, dead in the film. In December 2010, Neeson revealed that the film would be titled Wrath of the Titans and that filming was expected to begin next March.

In January 2011, it was reported that Édgar Ramírez and Toby Kebbell were in negotiations to play Ares and Agenor respectively. It was also reported that Bill Nighy was being courted to play Hephaestus. Additionally, Hayley Atwell was on the shortlist of actresses screen testing for the role of Andromeda, played in the previous film by Alexa Davalos who left due to a scheduling conflict. Other actresses being considered for Andromeda included Georgina Haig, Janet Montgomery, Dominique McElligott, and Clémence Poésy.

In February 2011, it was reported that Rosamund Pike was near a deal for the part. Also in February, Liebesman announced that Wrath of the Titans would be converted to 3D rather than shot in 3D as previously reported despite the negative criticism the first Clash of the Titans received for its use of post-conversion 3D. Liebesman explained, "I think what you have to remember is the first film was neither shot nor edited with 3D in mind. It was shot as a 2D movie and edited as a 2D film, and they decided to convert it with six or seven weeks to go until release, which is insane; the technology was not there. That's why we're conceiving it from the start, from the ground up, in 3D, editing in 3D for 3D." Liebesman also stated the reason behind the conversion was because he wants to shoot on film, which will give the film's imagery better texture than he would get shooting digitally.

Principal photography began on March 23, 2011. Filming took place in studios outside London and later shot on location in Coldharbour Surrey, South Wales and in the Canary Islands on the island of Tenerife and Torres del Paine National Park in Chilean Patagonia.

== Release ==
Wrath of the Titans premiered on March 26, 2012, at the AMC Lincoln Square Theater in New York City. Warner Bros. Pictures released the film in theaters in the United States on March 30, 2012.

=== Home media ===
Wrath of the Titans was released on Blu-ray, 3D Blu-ray, DVD and digital download on June 26, 2012.

== Reception ==
=== Box office ===
There's a lesson here: It's better to burn out than to fade away, as Neil Young famously sang, but not in the film business. If Wrath of the Titans ultimately flops, then, it will do so in the exact form today's Hollywood prefers: safely, quietly, without much of a fuss.

— Robert Levin of The Atlantic regarding the film's box office prospects and results.

Wrath of the Titans earned $83.6 million in North America and $221.6 million internationally for a worldwide total of $301 million, less than the $493 million grossed by its predecessor. The film was co-financed by Warner Bros. and Legendary Pictures for $150 million, about $25 million more than it cost to produce the original. It debuted day-and-date in 61 markets worldwide sans Japan and delivered a global opening of $110.3 million.

In the United States and Canada, the film was released in a total of 3,545 theaters with 2,900 3D locations (4,400 3D screens), and 290 IMAX locations. Initially, it was projected open around with $35–40 million. It opened Friday, March 30, 2012, with $1 million from midnight screenings in 1,490 theaters. The film went on to earn $34.2 million in North America over the weekend, finishing in second place behind The Hunger Games which was playing its second weekend. The opening was over half of the original's $61.2 million debut. It played well in IMAX representing $4.7 million of the total weekend's gross. The follow-up attracted a large male contingent on its opening weekend with 66%. Roughly 65% of the moviegoers – about 55% of whom were over the age of 25 – saw the film in 3D.

Dan Fellman, Warner Bros. president of domestic distribution, said the comparison between the opening of the first and second film was not fair because the original opened on Good Friday, when more teenagers were out on spring break. He lamented on the film's poor box office performance: "We made a decision to open a week before the holiday this time and generate positive word-of-mouth since we had issues with the last one regarding the 3-D conversion, we're gonna get there – we're just gonna get there in a different way." However, despite not opening on a holiday weekend, the film had the advantage of playing a week before Easter in which the company could avail the spring break, which was staggered over the next two weeks. However, all this didn't necessarily aid the film's further box office performance. Warner Bros. said they didn't expect the sequel to reach the same level.

Outside North America, the film had a more successful opening but this success later dwindled due to poor word of mouth and eventually was unable to topple the first film's final $332 million international gross. It opened in first place – dethroning The Hunger Games — with $76.1 million from 14,600 screens (9,766 of which were in 3D) in 60 territories. It debuted in first place in 46 markets, notably in nine of the top 12 international territories including South Korea ($4.3 million), France ($3.1 million) and Italy ($1.8 million). Its biggest opening territories were Russia and the CIS ($12.8 million, representing 18% of the total weekend foreign take), Mexico ($5.2 million) and Brazil ($4.1 million). The film was ranked No. 1 in 11 markets across Latin America. Also internationally, it had an IMAX opening of $4 million from 176 screens – or $22,000 per site – with Russia contributing about $55,000 per-screen at 19 IMAX locations.

=== Critical response ===
Rotten Tomatoes, a review aggregator, reports that 26% of 175 surveyed critics gave the film a positive review; the average rating is 4.5/10. The site's critical consensus reads, "Its 3D effects are an improvement over its predecessor's, but in nearly every other respect, Wrath of the Titans fails to improve upon the stilted acting, wooden dialogue, and chaos-driven plot of the franchise's first installment." Metacritic assigned the film an average score of 37 out of 100 based on 32 critics, indicating "generally unfavorable reviews". In CinemaScore polls conducted during the opening weekend, audiences gave the film an average grade of "B+" on an A+ to F scale, slightly better than the first film's "B" grade.

The film earned a Razzie Award nomination for Neeson as Worst Supporting Actor. Todd McCarthy of The Hollywood Reporter called it, "A relentlessly mechanical piece of work that will not or cannot take the imaginative leaps to yield even fleeting moments of awe, wonder or charm". Roger Ebert, who gave the first film three stars, awarded Wrath with only two, remarking "It lacks a comprehensible story, and you won't need your CliffsNotes on the Greek myths. You get an idea of who the major players are, and then they spend a modest amount of time shouting laughable dialogue at one another while being all but forced off the screen by special effects.". Mark Olsen of the Los Angeles Times criticized, "Directed this time out by Jonathan Liebesman, the film lacks inspiration or zest in storytelling, performance or action. This is pure product, a movie desperately without energy or enthusiasm of any kind". However, there have been some positive reviews. Andrew Barker of Variety noted that, "The [Clash of the Titans] franchise has matured ever so slightly with Wrath of the Titans, hewing incrementally more faithfully to its Greek origins and trimming the fat in essential places". Richard Corliss of Time magazine wrote, "Wrath [of the Titans] radiates the straight-forward, straight-faced pleasures of the mytho-muscular epics, like Hercules and Jason and the Argonauts, produced in Europe a half-century ago". Owen Gleiberman of Entertainment Weekly commented, "For a movie that's basically all warmed-over pseudo-mythology and special effects, Wrath of the Titans is certainly more fun, in its solemnly junky way, than John Carter. It may also be a little more fun than its cheeseball predecessor, the 2010 remake of Clash of the Titans".

== Cancelled sequel ==
Following the film's release, a second sequel, called Revenge of the Titans, was in the pipeline. However, due to Wrath's disappointing critical reception and box office returns, the project was later shelved. In May 2013, Worthington stated he did not think a third film would be made. In December 2013, producer Basil Iwanyk confirmed the sequel was not happening due to a lack of fresh ideas for the script.
