= Elyssa Davalos =

American actress

- Davalos in The Paper Chase (1978)
- Occupation: Actress
- Years active: 1973–2007
- Known for: Nikki Carpenter on "MacGyver"; Hillary Gant on "How the West Was Won"
- Spouse: Jeff Dunas (m. 1982; div. 1988)
- Children: Alexa Davalos
- Parent: Richard Davalos
- Relatives: Dominique Davalos (sister)

Elyssa Davalos is a former American television and movie actress.

== Biography ==
Davalos's father was actor Richard Davalos and her sister is musician Dominique Davalos. She is the mother of actress Alexa Davalos, from her marriage to photographer Jeff Dunas. She is of Spanish and Finnish descent on her father's side.

She would usually play tough, independent women. She is mostly remembered for her recurring role as Richard Dean Anderson's love interest Nikki Carpenter on the original MacGyver. She appeared in two Disney films that were part of a franchise: The Apple Dumpling Gang Rides Again and Herbie Goes Bananas. On television she played Hillary Gant on the series How The West Was Won and she appeared on a final season episode of Hawaii Five-0, and starred in the TV-movie Good Against Evil.

== Filmography ==
=== Film ===
Year	Title	Role	Notes
1973	The Student Teachers	Paula Kelly	
1979	The Apple Dumpling Gang Rides Again	Millie Gaskill	
1980	Herbie Goes Bananas	Melissa	
1993	A House in the Hills	Sondra Rankin	
1999	Tycus	Crying Woman	Video
2000	Urban Chaos Theory	The Mistress	Short
2002	Two Paths	Sally	Short
2003	Between the Sheets	Layla	
2007	Nancy Drew	Twin Palms Manager	

=== Television ===
Year	Title	Role	Notes
1975	Three for the Road	Sophie Gianelli	"Adventure in Los Angeles"
1976	ABC Afterschool Special	Linda	"Dear Lovey Hart: I Am Desperate"
1976	Charlie's Angels	Maria Bartone	"The Mexican Connection"
1977	Welcome Back, Kotter	Judy Horshack	"There Goes Number 5"
1977	Good Against Evil	Jessica Gordon	TV film
1977	The Hardy Boys/Nancy Drew Mysteries	Wendy Bonner	"The Mystery of King Tut's Tomb"
1978	Wild and Wooly	Shiloh	TV film
1978	The Paper Chase	Nancy Burch	"Nancy"
1978–79	How the West Was Won	Hillary Gant	Recurring role (seasons 2–3)
1979	Hawaii Five-O	Diana Webster	"Though the Heavens Fall"
1979	Vegas	Kimberly Sarrason	"Doubtful Target"
1981	Vegas	Wendy Paige	"No Way to Treat a Victim"
1981	Riker	Marlene	"Honkytonk"
1981	Code Red		"A Saved Life"
1983	Matt Houston	Carla / Gabrielle Delgado	"The Hunted", "Needle in a Haystack"
1983	Knight Rider	Julie Robinson	"Blind Spot"
1984	Mickey Spillane's Mike Hammer	Jackie Drake	"Negative Image"
1984	Riptide	Jody Kremer	"Something Fishy"
1985	Our Family Honor		"Pilot"
1985–86	Scarecrow and Mrs. King	Leslie O'Connor	"We're Off to See the Wizard", "Over the Limit", "Dead Men Leave No Trails"
1986	Airwolf	Barbara Scarelli	"Desperate Monday"
1987	Riviera	Ashley Stevens	TV film
1987–88	MacGyver	Lisa Kosov (two episodes) Nikki Carpenter	Recurring role (season 3)
1989	Beauty and the Beast	Lisa Campbell	"Arabesque"
1989	Doogie Howser, M.D.	Victoria Burke	"The Ice Queen Cometh"
1989	Matlock	Suzanne Cullen	"The Blues Singer"
1990	Father Dowling Mysteries	Marilyn Kemp	"The Exotic Dancer Mystery"
1990	Jake and the Fatman	Leah Champlin	"You Took Advantage of Me"
1990–91	Life Goes On	Doreen Gillespie	Guest role (season 2)
1992	Dark Justice		"Prime Cuts"
1993	Jericho Fever	Bettina	TV film
1993	Matlock	Karen Garber	"The View"
1993	Diagnosis: Murder	Ginger Shaw	"Miracle Cure"
1994	Diagnosis: Murder	Constance Wardell	"Death by Extermination"
1994	A Perry Mason Mystery: The Case of the Grimacing Governor	Violet Moore	TV film
1994	Matlock	Allison Darnell	"The P.I."
1997	Promised Land	Patricia Conroy	"Bookworm"
1999	Touched by an Angel	Penny Woodhouse	"The Anatomy Lesson"
2004	The Division		"Baby, the Rain Must Fall"
