= Alexa Davalos =

American actress (born 1982)

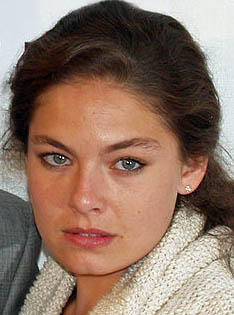
- Davalos in 2007
- Born: Alexa Davalos Dunas; May 28, 1982 (age 44); Paris, France
- Occupation: Actress
- Years active: 2002–present
- Spouse: Josh Stewart (m. 2019)
- Parent(s): Elyssa Davalos; Jeff Dunas
- Relatives: Richard Davalos (grandfather)

Alexa Davalos Dunas (born May 28, 1982) is an American actress. Her early role as Gwen Raiden on the fourth season of the TV series Angel (2002–03) was followed by other television roles and some Hollywood films, including The Chronicles of Riddick (2004) and Defiance (2008). In the late 2010s, she starred as Juliana Crain, the main character in the Amazon Studios series The Man in the High Castle. She also played Special Agent Kristin Gaines in the CBS drama series FBI: Most Wanted (2021–2023).

== Early life ==
Davalos was born in Paris, France, to American parents, photographer Jeff Dunas and actress Elyssa Davalos, the daughter of actor Richard Davalos. Davalos spent most of her childhood in France and Italy, before settling in New York. She has stated "I tend to curse in French more often than I do in English."

She is of Spanish and Finnish descent on her mother's side. Her father's family is Jewish (her paternal ancestors lived in Vilnius in Lithuania). She was raised "without much religion", though she attended Hebrew school for a time.

Davalos struck out on her own at seventeen and moved to New York City. She supported herself by modeling for photographers like Peter Lindbergh. "I had a mission," she recalls. "I wanted to be out in the world, doing my own thing. Working in a theatre, I discovered that I really wanted to act." Her passion soon grew towards acting, and she attended the Off-Broadway Flea Theater in New York. She kept her acting plans from her family until her career started to take off.

== Career ==
In 2002, Davalos co-starred with Charlie Hofheimer in the short film The Ghost of F. Scott Fitzgerald, which screened at the 2002 Toronto International Film Festival. She appeared as the superhuman Gwen Raiden in the television series Angel for three episodes, with which she nevertheless attracted attention. In September 2003, she was seen opposite Antonio Banderas in the HBO film And Starring Pancho Villa as Himself. Davalos' breakthrough was in the 2004 science fiction film The Chronicles of Riddick, where she also made her feature film debut.

Davalos continued to act in Hollywood films. In 2007, she was featured in the romantic drama Feast of Love, which starred Greg Kinnear and Morgan Freeman. She also played Sally in The Mist (directed by Frank Darabont), co-starring Thomas Jane, Laurie Holden and Marcia Gay Harden. In 2008, Davalos co-starred as the love interest of Daniel Craig in the war film Defiance, directed by Edward Zwick. Her performance was praised by critics. Davalos played Andromeda in the remake of Clash of the Titans, alongside Sam Worthington, Ralph Fiennes and Liam Neeson. The film received poor reviews but was a financial success. She did not return for the 2012 sequel, Wrath of the Titans, due to a scheduling conflict.

In addition to her film roles, she also continued to appear in television series, including Reunion (2005–2006) and Mob City (2013). In the latter, she played the female lead and reunited again with Frank Darabont. However, these television series were short-lived. In 2015, Davalos started acting in The Man in the High Castle (2015–2019), an Amazon Studios series based on the Philip K. Dick novel of the same name. Starring as Juliana Crain, the main character of the series, she played the biggest role of her career up to that point. She then made a brief appearance in The Punisher, along with star Jon Bernthal; both of whom were also in Mob City. In the early 2020s, Davalos had a regular role in two seasons of the CBS crime series FBI: Most Wanted as Special Agent Kristin Gaines. Davalos then played Rebekah in the Biblical mini series The Faithful (2026).

== Personal life ==
Davalos is a close friend of actresses Amanda Righetti and Chyler Leigh, and was Righetti's bridesmaid at her wedding. Davalos considers herself to be a "dork" and loves to travel and read.

Davalos married actor Josh Stewart on May 19, 2019.

== Filmography ==
=== Film ===
Year	Title	Role	Notes
2002	Coastlines	Eddie Vance's Girlfriend	Uncredited
2002	The Ghost of F. Scott Fitzgerald	Bess Gunther	Short film
2004	The Chronicles of Riddick	Jack / Kyra	Replacing Rhiana Griffith
2007	Feast of Love	Chloe Barlow	
2007	The Mist	Sally	
2008	Defiance	Lilka Ticktin	
2010	Clash of the Titans	Andromeda	

=== Television ===
Year	Title	Role	Notes
2002	Untitled Secret Service Project	Eliza Randolph	Unsold pilot
2002	Undeclared	Susan	Episode: "The Day After"
2002–03	Angel	Gwen Raiden	3 episodes
2003	And Starring Pancho Villa as Himself	Teddy Sampson	Television film
2005–06	Reunion	Samantha Carlton	Main role, 13 episodes
2006	Surrender, Dorothy	Sara	Television film
2007	Raines	Sandy Boudreau	Episode: Pilot
2013	Mob City	Jasmine Fontaine	Main role, 6 episodes
2015–19	The Man in the High Castle	Juliana Crain	Main role
2019	The Punisher	Beth Quinn	2 episodes
2021–23	FBI: Most Wanted	Special Agent Kristin Gaines	Main role
2026	The Faithful	Rebekah	
