= Aro Tolbukhin: In the Mind of a Killer =

2002 film

- Theatrical release poster
- Spanish: Aro Tolbukhin: En la mente del asesino
- Directed by: Isaac Pierre Racine; Agustí Villaronga; Lydia Zimmermann
- Written by: Isaac Pierre Racine; Agustí Villaronga; Lydia Zimmermann
- Produced by: Antonio Chavarrías; Gustavo Montiel Pagés
- Starring: Daniel Giménez Cacho; Carmen Beato; Zóltán Józan; Mariona Castillo; Aram González; Eva Fortea; Jesús Ramos; Pepa Charro
- Cinematography: Guillermo Granillo
- Edited by: Ernest Blasi
- Music by: José Manuel Pagán
- Release date: 8 November 2002
- Running time: 95 minutes
- Countries: Mexico; Spain
- Languages: Spanish; Catalan

Aro Tolbukhin: In the Mind of a Killer (Spanish: Aro Tolbukhin: En la mente del asesino) is a 2002 film, written and directed by Isaac Pierre Racine, Agustí Villaronga, and Lydia Zimmermann. It was the 2003 Mexican submission for the Academy Award for Best Foreign Language Film, but was not nominated.

== Plot ==
The film tells the story of Aro Tolbukhin, a Hungarian salesman who sets fire to seven people in an infirmary in a mission in Guatemala. The film follows his life, from his childhood in Hungary to his arrival in Guatemala, in an attempt to determine his motivations.

== Cast ==
- Daniel Giménez Cacho as Adult Aro
- Carmen Beato as Sister Carmen
- Zoltán Józan as Teenage Aro
- Mariona Castillo as Teenage Selma
- Aram González as Young Aro
- Eva Fortea as Young Selma
- Jesús Ramos as Father
- Pepa Charro as Dada

== See also ==
- List of Spanish films of 2002
- List of submissions to the 76th Academy Awards for Best Foreign Language Film
- List of Mexican submissions for the Academy Award for Best Foreign Language Film
