= Javier Navarrete =

Spanish film composer (born 1956)

- Born: 9 May 1956 (age 70); Teruel, Spain
- Occupation: Composer
- Website: Official website

Javier Navarrete (born May 9, 1956) is a Spanish film score composer. His best-known score, for which he received an Oscar nomination, was for Pan's Labyrinth (2006; his second collaboration with Guillermo del Toro, the first being The Devil's Backbone).

Navarrete was born in Teruel. His scores include Whore, Tras el cristal, Dot the i, and other Spanish films. In addition, he scored 2009's Cracks (directed by Jordan Scott), 2012's Byzantium (directed by Neil Jordan) and the U.S. productions, Mirrors, Wrath of the Titans and Inkheart. His score for the HBO film Hemingway & Gellhorn won him an Emmy Award. He also produced in 2015 the soundtrack for the Hong Kong–based film Zhong Kui: Snow Girl and the Dark Crystal.

== Works ==
=== 1980s ===
| Year | Title | Director | Notes |
|---|---|---|---|
| 1986 | In a Glass Cage | Agustí Villaronga | —N/a |
| 1989 | La banyera | Jesús Garay | —N/a |
| 1989 | Una ombra en el jardí | Antonio Chavarrías | —N/a |

=== 1990s ===
| Year | Title | Director | Notes |
|---|---|---|---|
| 1991 | Manila | Antonio Chavarrías | —N/a |
| 1995 | Atolladero | Óscar Aibar | —N/a |
| 1996 | Susanna | Antonio Chavarrías | —N/a |
| 1996 | Andrea | Sergi Casamitjana | —N/a |
| 1996 | Atapuerca: El misterio de la evolución humana | Javier Trueba | Documentary film |
| 1997 | 99.9 | Agustí Villaronga | —N/a |
| 1998 | Em dic Sara | Dolores Payás | —N/a |

=== 2000s ===
| Year | Title | Director | Notes |
|---|---|---|---|
| 2000 | The Sea | Agusti Villaronga | —N/a |
| 2000 | The Devil's Backbone | Guillermo del Toro | —N/a |
| 2001 | Stranded | María Lidón | —N/a |
| 2002 | The Impatient Alchemist | Patricia Ferreira | Co-composed with José Nieto |
| 2002 | Volverás | Antonio Chavarrías | —N/a |
| 2002 | Thirteen Chimes | Xavier Villaverde | —N/a |
| 2003 | Dot the i | Matthew Parkhill | —N/a |
| 2003 | Flying Saucers | Óscar Aibar | —N/a |
| 2004 | Whore | María Lidón | —N/a |
| 2006 | Moscow Zero | María Lidón | —N/a |
| 2006 | Pan's Labyrinth | Guillermo del Toro | —N/a |
| 2006 | Dance Machine | Óscar Aibar | —N/a |
| 2007 | His Majesty Minor | Jean-Jacques Annaud | —N/a |
| 2008 | Fireflies in the Garden | Dennis Lee | —N/a |
| 2008 | Mirrors | Alexandre Aja | —N/a |
| 2008 | Inkheart | Iain Softley | —N/a |
| 2009 | The Hole | Joe Dante | —N/a |
| 2009 | Cracks | Jordan Scott | —N/a |
| 2009 | The New Daughter | Luis Berdejo | —N/a |

=== 2010s ===
| Year | Title | Director | Notes |
|---|---|---|---|
| 2010 | The Warrior's Way | Sngmoo Lee | —N/a |
| 2011 | The Last Death | David Ruiz | —N/a |
| 2012 | Wrath of the Titans | Jonathan Liebesman | —N/a |
| 2012 | Hemingway & Gellhorn | Philip Kaufman | Television film |
| 2012 | Byzantium | Neil Jordan | —N/a |
| 2015 | Zhong Kui: Snow Girl and the Dark Crystal | Peter Pau; Zhao Tianyu | —N/a |
| 2018 | Greta | Neil Jordan | —N/a |
| 2018 | Raoul Taburin | Pierre Godeau | —N/a |

=== 2020s ===
| Year | Title | Director | Notes |
|---|---|---|---|
| 2020 | Emperor | Mark Amin | —N/a |
| 2021 | Antlers | Scott Cooper | —N/a |
| 2022 | Mr. Harrigan's Phone | John Lee Hancock | —N/a |
| 2023 | Sound of Freedom | Alejandro Gómez Monteverde | —N/a |

== Awards and nominations ==
=== Won ===
- Emmy Award 2012 Outstanding Music Composition for a Miniseries, Movie, or Special (Original Dramatic Score) – Hemingway & Gellhorn
- BMI Film & TV Awards 2012 Film Music – Wrath of the Titans
- Ariel Award 2007 Best Film Music – Pan's Labyrinth

=== Nominations ===
- Academy Award 2007 Best Original Score – Pan's Labyrinth
- Fangoria Chainsaw Awards 2014 Best Score – Byzantium
- Grammy Award 2008 Best Compilation Soundtrack Album for a Motion Picture, Television or Other Visual Media – Pan's Labyrinth
- Goya Award 2007 Best Original Score – Pan's Labyrinth
- Online Film Critics Society Awards 2007 Best Original Score – Pan's Labyrinth
