= Agustí Villaronga =

Spanish film director (1953–2023)

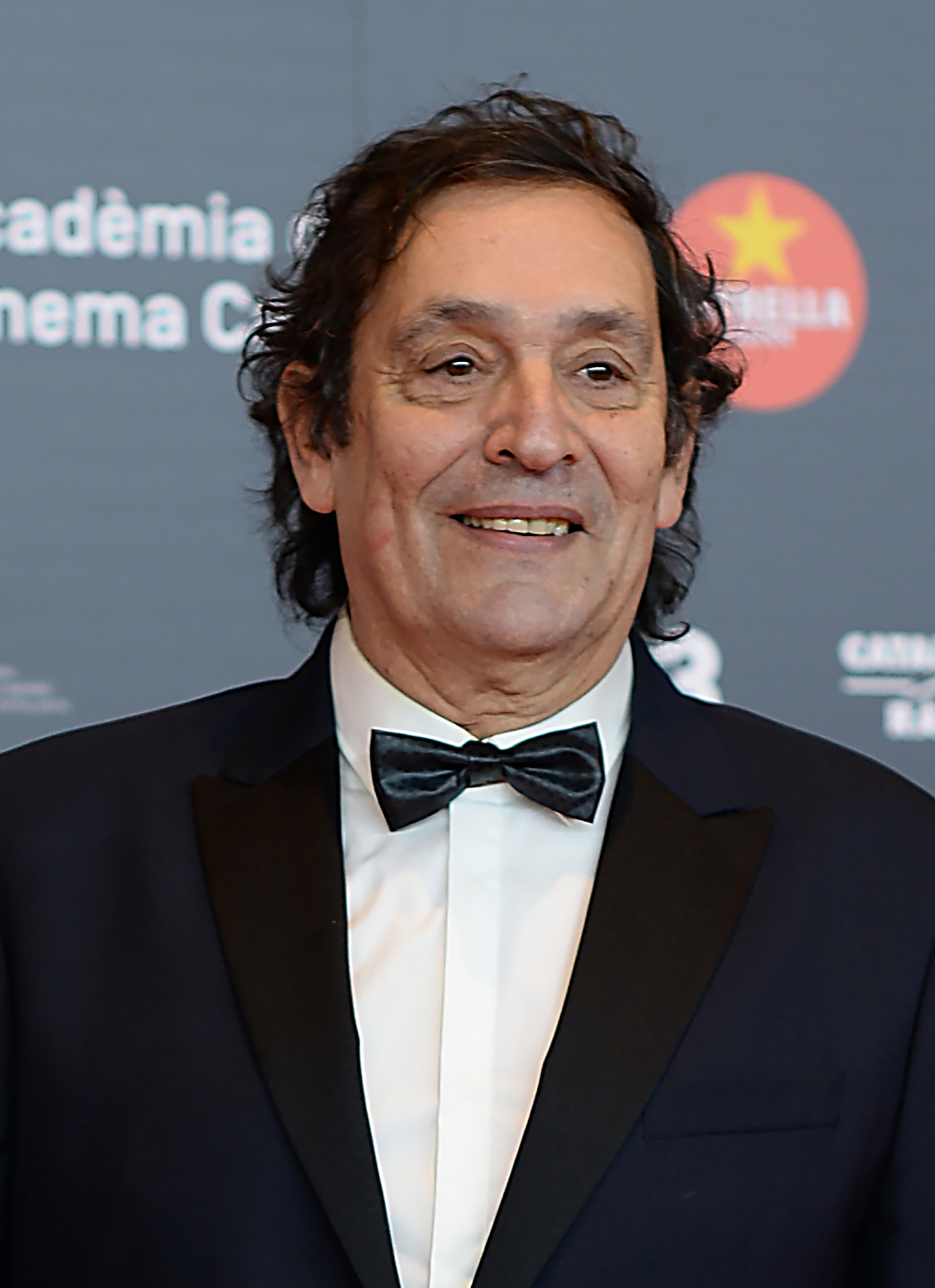
- Villaronga in 2020
- Born: Agustí Villaronga Riutort; 4 March 1953; Palma de Mallorca, Spain
- Died: 23 January 2023 (aged 69); Barcelona, Spain
- Occupations: Film director, screenwriter, actor
- Years active: 1976–2023

Agustí Villaronga Riutort (Catalan pronunciation: [əɣusˈti βiʎəˈɾoŋɡə]; 4 March 1953 – 23 January 2023) was a Spanish film director, screenwriter and actor. He directed several feature films, a documentary, three projects for television and three shorts. His film Moon Child was entered into the 1989 Cannes Film Festival.

His auteur approach to filmmaking was described by ScreenDaily as demostrative of "a keen insight into human pain and cruelty". In 2011 he won the Goya Award for Best Director for Black Bread. The Catalan-language film was selected as the Spanish entry for the Best Foreign Language Film at the 84th Academy Awards, but it did not make the final shortlist.

== Life and career ==
Agustí Villaronga was born on 4 March 1953 in Palma. His grandparents were itinerant puppeteers and his father was a child of the Spanish Civil War, a background that would resurface repeatedly in the director's filmography. Since childhood, his father encouraged his love for films and from early in his life he wanted to become a film director. He worked as an actor and made some shorts.

Villaronga made his directorial debut in 1986 with the film In a Glass Cage, which was selected by the Berlin film festival receiving critical praise and many awards. The plot follows a former Nazi doctor, now paralyzed and depending on an iron lung to live, who begins to be taken care of by a young man, one of the children he abused during the war. In a Glass Cage already shows some of the key elements in Villaronga's filmography: a disturbed childhood marked by violence, an early discovery of sexuality.

His second film, Moon Child (1989), is about a child who goes to Africa to join a tribe awaiting the arrival of white child God. In 1992 he made a documentary, Al-Andalus, produced by Sogetel and the MoMa of New York City. For some years Villaronga tried unsuccessfully to find financing to adapt a novel by Mercè Rodoreda, La mort i la primavera. Instead he had to take some commission works. One of these was El pasajero clandestino, an adaptation of a Georges Simenon novel, that lacked the personal characteristics of his filmography.

Called by actress María Barranco, Villaronga directed the 1997 horror film 99.9, which won the award for Best Cinematography at the 1997 Sitges Film Festival. In 2000, Villaronga came back with a project of his own: El mar, a story set in Mallorca about three former childhood friends, traumatized by the violence they experienced during the Spanish Civil War, that are reunited ten years later as young adults. The key elements in Villaronga's filmography are present in this story: childhood, sexual awakening, homosexuality and violence.

In 2002, Villaronga co-directed with Lydia Zimmermann and Isaac Pierre Racine the film Aro Tolbukhin: In the Mind of a Killer. In 2005 he directed a music video for French superstar Mylène Farmer's song Fuck Them All. In 2007 he made Después de la lluvia, a made for television project adapting a stage play. It was only until 2010 with Black Bread, when Villaronga finally achieved wider appeal. This film, winner of nine Goya Awards including best film and best director, tells the story of an eleven year old boy who growing up in the harsh period of the aftermath of the Spanish Civil War in Catalonia's countryside discovers the world of lies around him.

Villaronga followed Black Bread's success with A Letter to Evita, a TV miniseries co-produced by TV3, which recounts a real episode in the life of Eva Perón while visiting Spain in the late 1940s.

Villaronga was openly gay. He died on 22 January 2023 in Barcelona, at the age of 69. At the time of his death, he had one project, Stormy Lola, outstanding. It was shot in 2022, and was his first comedy film.

Villaronga received the Gold Medal of Merit in the Fine Arts on 1 December 2022.

== Filmography ==
=== Film ===
Year	Title	Director	Writer	Notes	Ref
1986	In a Glass Cage	Yes	Yes	Manfred Salzberg Award at the Berlin film festival	
1989	Moon Child	Yes	Yes		
1992	Al-Andalus: The Art of Islamic Spain	Yes	Yes	Documentary medium-length film	
1997	99.9	Yes	Yes		
2000	The Sea	Yes	Yes	Based on a novel by Blai Bonet.	
2002	Aro Tolbukhin: In the Mind of a Killer	Yes	Yes	Co-directed with Isaac Pierre Racine and Lydia Zimmermann.	
2010	Black Bread	Yes	Yes	Winner of nine Goya Awards, including best film, best director and best adapted screenplay.	
2015	The King of Havana	Yes	Yes		
2017	Uncertain Glory	Yes	Yes	Based on the novel Uncertain Glory by Joan Sales.	
2019	Born a King	Yes	No	United Kingdom and United Arab Emirates production	
2021	The Belly of the Sea	Yes	Yes		
2023	Stormy Lola	Yes	Yes	Posthumously released work	

==== Short film ====
Year	Title	Director	Writer	Notes
1976	Anta mujer	Yes	Yes	
1980	Al Mayurka	Yes	Yes	
1980	Laberint	Yes	Yes	
2000	Gracia Exquisita	Yes	No	Short films anthology
2005	Fuck Them All	Yes	No	Music video for Mylène Farmer
2015	El Testament de Rosa	Yes	Yes	

=== Television ===
Year	Title	Director	Writer	Notes
1995	Cycle Simenon	Yes	Yes	TV Anthology serie Episode "Le passages clandestin"
1997	Croniques de la vertat oculta	Yes	Yes	Episode "Pedagogia Aplicada"
2007	Miguel Bauça, Poeta Invisible	Yes	Yes	TV Movie
2007	Despues de La Lluvia	Yes	Yes	TV Movie
2009	50 años de..	Yes	No	Documentary TV Series; Episode "Fe"
2012	Carta a Eva	Yes	Yes	TV Mini-series; 2 episodes

== Accolades ==
Year	Award	Category	Work	Result	Ref
1990	4th Goya Awards	Best Director	Moon Child	Nominated	
1990	4th Goya Awards	Best Original Screenplay	Moon Child	Won	
2011	3rd Gaudí Awards	Best Director	Black Bread	Won	
2011	3rd Gaudí Awards	Best Screenplay	Black Bread	Won	
2011	25th Goya Awards	Best Director	Black Bread	Won	
2011	25th Goya Awards	Best Adapted Screenplay	Black Bread	Won	
2016	8th Gaudí Awards	Best Director	The King of Havana	Nominated	
2016	8th Gaudí Awards	Best Screenplay	The King of Havana	Nominated	
2016	30th Goya Awards	Best Adapted Screenplay	The King of Havana	Nominated	
2018	10th Gaudí Awards	Best Director	Uncertain Glory	Nominated	
2018	10th Gaudí Awards	Best Screenplay	Uncertain Glory	Nominated	
2022	36th Goya Awards	Best Adapted Screenplay	The Belly of the Sea	Nominated	
2022	14th Gaudí Awards	Best Director	The Belly of the Sea	Nominated	
2022	14th Gaudí Awards	Best Screenplay	The Belly of the Sea	Nominated	
