= Martin Walsh (film editor) =

British film editor

- Born: 8 November 1955 (age 70); Manchester, England, UK
- Occupation: Film editor

Martin Walsh (born 8 November 1955 in Manchester, England) is an English film editor with more than 30 film credits dating from 1984. Walsh won the Academy Award for Best Film Editing and the ACE Eddie Award for the film Chicago (2002), for which he was also nominated for the BAFTA Award for Best Editing. Walsh has been elected to membership in the American Cinema Editors.

== Selected filmography ==
Editor
Year	Film	Director	Notes	Ref.
1984	Sacred Hearts	Barbara Rennie		
1989	Courage Mountain	Christopher Leitch		
1989	The Wolves of Willoughby Chase	Stuart Orme	First collaboration with Stuart Orme	
1990	The Krays	Peter Medak		
1991	Hear My Song	Peter Chelsom	First collaboration with Peter Chelsom	
1992	Wild West	David Attwood		
1993	Bad Behaviour	Les Blair		
1994	Backbeat	Iain Softley	First collaboration with Iain Softley	
1995	Funny Bones	Peter Chelsom	Second collaboration with Peter Chelsom	
1995	Hackers	Iain Softley	Second collaboration with Iain Softley	
1996	Feeling Minnesota	Steven Baigelman		
1997	Roseanna's Grave	Paul Weiland		
1997	Welcome to Woop Woop	Stephan Elliott		
1998	The Mighty	Peter Chelsom	Third collaboration with Peter Chelsom	
1998	Hilary and Jackie	Anand Tucker	Second collaboration with Anand Tucker	
1999	Mansfield Park	Patricia Rozema		
1999	Whatever Happened to Harold Smith?	Peter Hewitt		
2001	Bridget Jones's Diary	Sharon Maguire		
2001	Strictly Sinatra	Peter Capaldi		
2001	Iris	Richard Eyre		
2002	Chicago	Rob Marshall		
2004	Thunderbirds	Jonathan Frakes		
2005	Separate Lies	Julian Fellowes		
2005	V for Vendetta	James McTeigue		
2007	Blood & Chocolate	Katja von Garnier		
2008	Angus, Thongs and Perfect Snogging	Gurinder Chadha		
2008	Inkheart	Iain Softley	Third collaboration with Iain Softley	
2010	Clash of the Titans	Louis Leterrier		
2010	Prince of Persia: The Sands of Time	Mike Newell		
2011	Ra.One	Anubhav Sinha		
2012	Wrath of the Titans	Jonathan Liebesman		
2014	Jack Ryan: Shadow Recruit	Kenneth Branagh	First collaboration with Kenneth Branagh	
2015	Cinderella	Kenneth Branagh	Second collaboration with Kenneth Branagh	
2015	Eddie the Eagle	Dexter Fletcher		
2017	Wonder Woman	Patty Jenkins		
2017	Justice League	Zack Snyder		
2021	Silent Night	Camille Griffin		
2023	Tetris	Jon S. Baird		
2024	Back to Black	Sam Taylor-Johnson		
2026	In the Grey	Guy Ritchie		
2026	The Sheep Detectives	Kyle Balda		
—N/a	Batgirl	Adil El Arbi and Bilall Fallah	Unreleased	

Editorial department
Year	Film	Director	Role
2005	Bee Season	Scott McGehee; David Siegel	Additional editor

Thanks
Year	Film	Director	Role	Notes
1996	Saint-Ex	Anand Tucker	Special thanks	First collaboration with Anand Tucker
2015	Tear Me Apart	Alex Lightman	Thanks	

Short documentaries

Sound department
Year	Film	Director	Role
1977	Grow with Skelmersdale	John M. Gresty	Sound

TV documentaries

Editor
Year	Film	Director
1994	Land of Dreams - Randy Newman's America	Leslie Woodhead

TV movies

Editor
Year	Film	Director	Notes
1989	The Fifteen Streets	David Wheatley	
1993	Don't Leave Me This Way	Stuart Orme	Second collaboration with Stuart Orme
1993	Dancing Queen	Nick Hamm	

TV series

Editor
Year	Title	Notes
1984	Africa	
1986	Oil	
1988	The Fear	5 episodes
2012	Titanic: Blood and Steel	2 episodes
