= The Chronicles of Riddick =

2004 film directed by David Twohy

- Theatrical release poster
- Directed by: David Twohy
- Written by: David Twohy
- Based on: Characters by Jim Wheat; Ken Wheat
- Produced by: Scott Kroopf; Vin Diesel
- Starring: Vin Diesel; Thandiwe Newton; Karl Urban; Colm Feore; Linus Roache; Keith David; Yorick van Wageningen; Alexa Davalos; Nick Chinlund; Judi Dench
- Cinematography: Hugh Johnson
- Edited by: Tracy Adams; Martin Hunter; Dennis Virkler
- Music by: Graeme Revell
- Production companies: Radar Pictures; One Race Films
- Distributed by: Universal Pictures
- Release date: June 11, 2004
- Running time: 119 minutes 135 minutes (Director's cut)
- Country: United States
- Language: English
- Budget: $105–120 million
- Box office: $115.8 million

The Chronicles of Riddick is a 2004 American science fiction action film written and directed by David Twohy. It is a sequel to Pitch Black (2000) and the second installment in the Riddick film series. Vin Diesel reprises his role as Richard B. Riddick and acts as producer, alongside Thandiwe Newton (credited as Thandie), Karl Urban, Alexa Davalos, Colm Feore, and Keith David. It follows the adventures of Riddick as he attempts to elude capture and face an invading empire.

The film received negative reviews. It grossed $115.8 million worldwide, making it the highest-grossing film in the franchise but still a financial disappointment. A sequel, titled Riddick, was released in 2013.

== Plot ==
A crew of bounty hunters led by Toombs arrives at the planet U.V. 6 to hunt down Riddick, a notorious wanted fugitive. Riddick effortlessly kills Toombs' crew and forces Toombs to reveal the source of his intel: New Mecca on planet Helion Prime.

Commandeering Toombs' ship, Riddick heads to Helion Prime. He confronts Abu al-Walid, an Imam whom he rescued five years earlier, and one of the few that knows of his hiding place. Abu al-Walid tried to reach out to Riddick as he believes Helion Prime is the target of the Necromongers, religious fanatics aiming to absorb all human life into their ranks or kill those who resist. Aereon, an Air Elemental, believes Riddick is a Furyan, a member of a race of warriors long thought extinct.

That night, massive Necromongers carriers attack Helion Prime and take control of the planet within hours. During the battle, Abu al-Walid is killed, Aereon is captured, and Riddick sneaks onto a Necromonger ship.

As "the Purifier," the Necromonger high priest, coerces the populace into converting, Riddick shows himself and kills the warrior who killed Abu al-Walid. Intrigued, Lord Marshal, the Necromongers' leader, orders Riddick be scanned by the Quasi-Dead telepaths, who determine he is a Furyan survivor. A shocked Lord Marshal orders Riddick's death, but he escapes only to be captured by Toombs. Toombs' new crew takes Riddick to Crematoria, a scorching subterranean prison moon.

Lord Marshal sends Commander Vaako to hunt down Riddick. Vaako's wife speaks to Aereon, who reveals Lord Marshal devastated planet Furya after he was told a child from that planet would kill him. Dame Vaako and her husband determine Lord Marshal wants Riddick dead, as he may be the child of said prophecy.

On Crematoria, Riddick finds Jack, the girl he also rescued five years ago, now named Kyra, who resents him for abandoning her. Meanwhile, tension brews between Toombs and the prison warden, who knows this bounty has attracted the Necromongers to Crematoria. A firefight breaks out, killing most of the bounty hunters except for Toombs.

Overpowering and locking Toombs in a cell, Riddick escapes the prison and leads several prisoners across Crematoria's volcanic surface to the hangar to steal Toombs' ship. As the prisoners reach the outside of the hangar, they find that Necromonger ships have also landed. A three-way fight breaks out between the Necromongers, the prisoners, and the hangar guards. In the end, all of the guards and prisoners are killed, Riddick is incapacitated by Vaako, and Kyra is captured. As the deadly sunrise approaches, Vaako leaves Riddick to die and departs, reporting Riddick dead to the Lord Marshal.

The Purifier, who stays behind, drags Riddick to safety. He reveals that he too is a Furyan and encourages Riddick to kill the Lord Marshal, then commits suicide by walking into the scorching sunlight.

Flying back to Helion Prime on Toombs's ship, Riddick infiltrates the Necromongers' flagship. Dame Vaako sees him but encourages her husband to let Riddick fight Lord Marshal first, then kill the victor and take place as leader. Taking advantage of the Necromonger's culture, Riddick openly challenges Lord Marshal, who taunts him by revealing Kyra has been converted. Riddick fights Lord Marshal, who keeps the upper hand with his supernatural powers. When Riddick's life is at risk, Kyra stabs the Lord Marshal with a spear and gets knocked into a column of spikes. Vaako attempts to strike the wounded Lord Marshal, who evades the blow. However, Riddick intercepts and kills him. After Kyra dies in Riddick's arms, the Necromongers, including Vaako, kneel before Riddick as their new leader.

== Cast ==
- Vin Diesel as Richard B. Riddick, the notorious criminal and last survivor of the Furyan race. Riddick has spent the last five years living in isolation to avoid bounty hunters and mercenaries.
- Colm Feore as the Lord Marshal, leader of the Necromonger faith. He possesses unnatural abilities granted to him after visiting the Underverse, the Necromonger Promised Land. He is the subject of a prophecy that foretells of his death at the hands of a Furyan warrior.
- Keith David as Abu al-Walid, one of the survivors that Riddick saved in Pitch Black. He is now married and has a daughter.
- Alexa Davalos as Jack / Kyra, the other survivor saved by Riddick in Pitch Black. She sets out to find Riddick and gets sold into slavery before being sent to prison for murder. She changes her name to Kyra to signify that she's no longer an innocent girl.
- Karl Urban as Commander Vaako, a loyal Necromonger Commander who is tasked with hunting down and killing Riddick. Vaako is a competent soldier who is fiercely loyal to the Lord Marshal.
- Thandiwe Newton (credited as Thandie Newton) as Dame Vaako, Commander Vaako's wife. She doesn't share her husband's loyalty to the Lord Marshal and develops a plan for her husband to replace him.
- Judi Dench as Aereon, an Air Elemental who is kept prisoner by the Lord Marshal, who seeks her advice on how to deal with Riddick.
- Nick Chinlund as Toombs, a mercenary and bounty hunter who pursues Riddick.
- Linus Roache as The Purifier, a Necromonger priest who is also a Furyan survivor.
- Yorick van Wageningen as The Guv, a leader among the prisoners on Crematoria who makes the surface run with Riddick.
- Kim Hawthorne as Lajjun, Imam's wife.
- Christina Cox as Eve Logan, a mercenary who joins Toombs's new crew
- Alexis Llewellyn as Ziza, Imam's daughter.
- Peter Williams as Convict #2, a prisoner who makes the surface run with Riddick.

== Production ==
Universal Pictures decided to develop a sequel to Pitch Black after the success of The Fast and the Furious, another action film that starred Vin Diesel. Diesel was offered $11 million to return for the sequel, a million dollars more than what he was offered for XXX. Universal hired David Hayter to come up with a script, which was later revised by Akiva Goldsman. However, Universal passed it up for a new draft from the first film's director and writer, David Twohy.

According to Diesel, the film's broader fantasy elements were introduced by him; the concept of Elementals came from Dungeons & Dragons, of which Diesel is a fan. Judi Dench was performing at Haymarket Theatre when Diesel made an offer for her to be in The Chronicles of Riddick. Dench said, "Vin sent me a bouquet of flowers that were so big they couldn't fit up the stairs to my dressing room. They could not get them into the corridor. Then he asked if I would be in his film. And of course I said yes. Why ever not?" Filming took place in Vancouver, Canada.

== Release ==
=== Home media ===
There are three versions of the film: the theatrical cut, which was PG-13; the director's cut, which is unrated (both are available on DVD); and the third version, a mix of the two assembled for television viewing, which has some, but not all, of the added footage from the director's cut. For instance, the minor subplot in the director's cut of Riddick's visions, as well as his moments with Toombs's second in command, are both absent, but the ending from the director's cut is present.

The "unrated director's cut" DVD (featuring scenes which were cut in order to obtain a PG-13 rating) was released on November 16, 2004, and sold 1.5 million copies on the first day alone.

The Chronicles of Riddick was also officially released as part of the Riddick Trilogy DVD collection (alongside The Chronicles of Riddick: Dark Fury and The Chronicles of Riddick: Pitch Black) on May 30, 2006.

== Reception ==
=== Box office ===
The production budget for The Chronicles of Riddick was reported to have been between $105 million and $120 million. The film grossed $57 million in North America, and its total worldwide gross stands between $107 million and $115 million.

=== Critical response ===
On Rotten Tomatoes the film has an approval rating of 28% based on reviews from 166 critics and an average score of 4.60/10. The site's critical consensus states, "As an action movie, Riddick offers some thrills, but as a sequel to Pitch Black, it's a disappointment". Metacritic gives the film a score of 38 out of 100 based on reviews from 34 critics, indicating "generally unfavorable reviews". Audiences polled by CinemaScore gave the film an average grade of "B" on an A+ to F scale.

Slant Magazine gave the film 1.5 out of 4 and stated, "Eschewing the claustrophobic minimalism of its predecessor Pitch Black, The Chronicles of Riddick is an extravagant orgy of used sci-fi parts." Owen Gleiberman of Entertainment Weekly gave the film a score of 'C' and called it "mostly a ponderous chronicle." Claudia Puig of USA Today gave the film 1.5 out of 4 and criticized its pacing. Mick LaSalle of San Francisco Chronicle gave the film 1 out of 4 and stated that it is "an inane film rendered sometimes laughable by an atmosphere of dead-serious reverence." Ann Hornaday of Washington Post gave the film a negative review and stated that "The Chronicles of Riddick doesn't hark back merely to the classic horror or science fiction canon but to nearly every single cinematic genre in the book, from westerns to film noir to sword-and-sandal epics." Desson Thomson of Washington Post also gave the film a negative review and said that "the muddy, convoluted story revolves around the star's cool-guy poses and one-liners."

James Berardinelli of ReelViews gave the film 2.5 out of 4 and stated that "although The Chronicles of Riddick offers its share of solidly entertaining moments, it doesn't hold together as a single, coherent motion picture experience." Ty Burr of Boston Globe gave the film 2 out of 4 and called it "a hodgepodge of Lord of the Rings, Starship Troopers, and the more recent Star Wars films." Roger Ebert of Chicago Sun-Times gave the film 2 out of 4 and called it "an exercise in computer-generated effects." Paul Clinton of CNN gave the film a negative review and called it "a big, cheesy sci-fi flick tailor-made for a young male audience looking for things that go boom." BBC gave the film 2 out of 5 and praised Diesel's "imposing screen presence", but criticized its "risible dialogue". Time Out also gave the film a negative review and stated, "The sequel baton pass at the finale is pretty nifty, but it's surely asking too much to think the filmmakers could leave us wanting more. Come to think of it, much, much less would have been best." Nell Minow of Common Sense Media gave the film 2 out of 5 and termed it a "very violent, brainless explosion movie." The Austin Chronicle gave the film 3 out of 5 and called it a "bloated, but enjoyable production."

=== Accolades ===
For his performance in the film, Vin Diesel was nominated for a Razzie Award for Worst Actor at the 2004 Golden Raspberry Awards, but lost to George W. Bush for Fahrenheit 9/11.

== Video games ==
The film spun off books, an action figure line, animation and video games.

The Xbox game The Chronicles of Riddick: Escape from Butcher Bay was released simultaneously with the film and was well received. On April 7, 2009, a remake of the video game was included with the release of the game sequel The Chronicles of Riddick: Assault on Dark Athena.

== Short film ==
The animated short film The Chronicles of Riddick: Dark Fury was released by Aeon Flux director Peter Chung.

== Sequel ==
A sequel called Riddick was released in 2013.
