= Juana Doña =

Spanish writer (1918–2003)

Juana Doña Jiménez
- Born: 17 December 1918; Madrid, Spain
- Died: 18 October 2003 (aged 84); Barcelona, Spain
- Occupations: Writer; trade unionist
- Known for: Trade unionist, feminist, politician
- Notable work: Desde la noche y la niebla

Juana Doña Jiménez (17 December 1918 – 18 October 2003) was a Spanish communist, feminist, trade unionist, and writer. She was active in the Communist Party of Spain (PCE) and became a symbol of anti-Francoist resistance and the women's movement.

== Biography ==
Doña joined the Union of Communist Youth of Spain in January 1933, at the age of 15. In September of that year, she was arrested for the first time while acting as a picket during the general strike in Madrid. She later became the women's secretary for the Southern Sector and subsequently the national women's secretary of the Communist Youth Central Committee, later joining the Agrupación de Mujeres Antifascistas (Antifascist Women's Group).

In 1936, she began living with Eugenio Mesón, a prominent leader of the Unified Socialist Youth, who remained her partner until his execution in 1941.

At the outbreak of the Spanish Civil War, Doña worked in support roles behind the front lines. Her first daughter, Lina, was born in January 1937, named in memory of her friend Lina Odena, a communist militant who took her own life to avoid capture by Falangists. Lina died of meningitis at seven months while in Valencia with her grandmother. In February 1938, Doña gave birth to her second child, Alexis, while continuing her work with the provincial committee of the Antifascist Women’s Group.

After the Casado coup of 1939, her husband was arrested and imprisoned in San Miguel de los Reyes in Valencia. Juana, her son, and her sister attempted to flee Spain from Alicante but were captured and sent to the Los Almendros concentration camp. In May 1939, they were transferred to Madrid in a freight train packed with prisoners—a seven-day journey during which several children died, their mothers forced to leave their bodies on the station platforms along the way.

Upon arriving in Madrid, she connected with the clandestine Communist Party of Spain organization, hiding in friends’ homes. In June 1939, she used forged documents to visit her husband in Yeserías Prison. On 5 December 1939, Doña, her mother, and her sister were arrested and accused of belonging to the reconstituted Communist Party and of involvement in the assassination of Commander Isaac Gabaldón, an event that led to harsh repression and the execution of The Thirteen Roses.

She was tortured with electric shocks at the Ministry of the Interior and later imprisoned in Ventas Women's Prison, where she continued to be tortured. Her mother and sister were released after suffering brutal torture themselves.

While in prison, Doña taught illiterate women and took lessons from imprisoned Republican teachers. She was released on 28 May 1941. Her husband was executed on 3 July of that same year at the eastern cemetery walls of Madrid.

After her release, she worked as a servant and sold bread in the Mercado de San Miguel. In 1944, she rejoined the underground resistance, becoming part of the Madrid Urban Guerrilla within the "Agrupación Madrid." She transported dynamite from Valdemanco to Madrid and directed attacks against the Brigada Político-Social and the Argentine embassy—symbolic actions that drew attention without casualties.

In 1947, she was arrested again along with her mother and taken to the Dirección General de Seguridad, where she was tortured and forced to witness the death of a comrade. In May, she was tried and sentenced to death. The PCE launched an international campaign to save her and others facing execution. Eva Perón, at the request of Doña's son, interceded during her visit to Spain, securing a commutation of the sentence to 30 years in prison. Her comrades from the same trial were executed on 28 August at the Carabanchel Cemetery.

Doña served 14 years in prison, passing through Ventas, Málaga Women's Prison, Segovia Women's Prison, Guadalajara Prison, and Alcalá de Henares Prison. She took part in hunger strikes in Málaga and Segovia, and later denounced the expulsion of two communist inmates accused of being lesbians.

Released in 1961, she went into exile in France, where she reconnected with the PCE in exile and became involved in the international feminist movement. She later founded the Women's Liberation and Equality Movement.

In 1973, she attended the first congress of the Communist Party of Spain (Marxist–Leninist) (PCE m–l) with her son Alexis, where both participated in the presidential table, though her membership remains unclear. The PCE (m–l) states that she was active in the party between 1965 and 1976 and directed from Paris the Popular Women's Union (UPM), part of the Revolutionary Antifascist and Patriotic Front (FRAP).

During the Spanish Transition, Doña ran for the Senate as a PCE candidate. She later joined the Workers’ Revolutionary Organization and took part in the founding of the Communist Party of the Peoples of Spain in 1984. She published several books, including Mujer, Desde la noche y la niebla, Gente de abajo, and Querido Eugenio. Doña continued her activism as a member of Comisiones Obreras, a contributor to Mundo Obrero, and a member of the PCE Central Committee.

She died in Barcelona on 18 October 2003, at the age of 84.

== Recognition ==
- In 1998 she received the Comadre de Oro Award from the Tertulia Feminista Les Comadres for her feminist career.
- On 29 May 2018, the Madrid City Council honored her by renaming Calle Batalla de Belchite as Calle Juana Doña in the Arganzuela district.
- A municipal Espacio de Igualdad (Equality Center) in Arganzuela is also named in her honor.

== Selected works ==
- Mujer (1977)
- Desde la noche y la niebla (mujeres en las cárceles franquistas), foreword by Alfonso Sastre. Madrid: Ediciones de la Torre (1978)
- Gente de abajo (No me arrepiento de nada), foreword by Manuel Vázquez Montalbán. Madrid: A-Z Ediciones (1992)
- Querido Eugenio (A Love Letter Across Time), foreword by Manuel Vázquez Montalbán. Barcelona: Lumen (2003)
