= Dan Mazeau =

American screenwriter

- Born: 1980 (age 44–45); Santa Rosa, California
- Citizenship: American
- Education: University of California, Berkeley University of California, Los Angeles
- Occupation: Screenwriter

Dan Mazeau is an American screenwriter. While attending the MFA screenwriting program at UCLA, he wrote a family fantasy "The Land of Lost Things" and the script was set up at Nickelodeon/Paramount Pictures, with Arnold Kopelson producing. Mazeau was hired by Dan Lin and Warner Bros. to adapt Jonny Quest. He was named one of Variety's "10 Screenwriters to Watch" in 2008 and the script was on the Blacklist that same year.

== Early life and career ==
He was born and raised in Santa Rosa, California and majored in physics at the University of California, Berkeley. He then enrolled in the MFA screenwriting program at the University of California, Los Angeles (UCLA). He is a graduate of the Professional Program in Screenwriting at the UCLA School of Theater, Film and Television.

== Career ==
Mazeau wrote a script for a Jonny Quest adaptation. He has also been attached to write a script for Bleach, based on the popular manga.

By January 2009, Mazeau was hired by Warner Brothers to write a script for The Flash after previous iterations by David S. Goyer, Shawn Levy, David Dobkin and Craig Wright failed to get off the ground. In April 2018, Mazeau was revealed to have contributed to a draft of the film, titled Flashpoint.

In 2013, Mazeau was hired to adapt Japanese author Chohei Kambayashi's alien invasion novel Yukikaze for Warner Bros. Pictures, with Tom Cruise set to star, though the project never came to fruition. Mazeau has also been hired to rewrite an action film entitled World's Most Wanted with Vin Diesel currently attached.

== Writing credits ==
- Wrath of the Titans (2012)
- Fast X (2023)
- Damsel (2024) (Also executive producer)
