= Han Lue =

Fast & Furious fictional character

- Better Luck Tomorrow and Fast & Furious character
- Sung Kang as Han Lue in Fast Five
- First appearance: Better Luck Tomorrow (2002)
- Created by: Justin Lin; Ernesto Foronda; Fabian Marquez
- Adapted by: Chris Morgan
- Portrayed by: Sung Kang

In-universe information
- Alias: Han Seoul-Oh
- Gender: Male
- Occupation: Street Racer
- Affiliation: Crew members: Dominic Toretto; Letty Ortiz; Brian O'Conner; Mia Toretto; Rico Santos; Tego Leo; Roman Pearce; Tej Parker; Vince (deceased); Luke Hobbs; Ramsey; Sean Boswell; Twinkie; Earl; Reiko; Ben Manibag (previously); Takashi "D.K." (previously); Morimoto (previously, deceased)
- Significant other: Gisele Yashar
- Children: Elle (adoptive daughter)
- Nationality: American

Han Lue (also known by his alias Han Seoul-Oh) is a fictional character in the Fast & Furious franchise. He is portrayed by Sung Kang, who, like the character himself, is of Korean descent. The character appears for the first time in Justin Lin's 2002 film Better Luck Tomorrow, before being incorporated into the Fast & Furious franchise by Lin in his 2006 film The Fast and the Furious: Tokyo Drift, appearing in Tokyo as the mentor of Sean Boswell, seemingly dying in an explosion after a collision three-quarters of the way through the film. Han's status as a member of Dominic Toretto's crew was shown in the subsequent films Fast & Furious, Fast Five, Fast & Furious 6, and Furious 7 as well as the short film Los Bandoleros, all set between the events of Better Luck Tomorrow and Tokyo Drift. He reappeared in F9, his first appearance set after the events of Tokyo Drift, in which his death is retconned, and later partnering with Deckard Shaw in Fast X.

Han is considered a breakout character, with the timeline of the Fast & Furious series altered on multiple occasions to explain his presence despite his death (prior to it being retconned), with Kang receiving significant praise for his performance as the character.

== Development ==
The character originally appeared in Better Luck Tomorrow, directed by Justin Lin. When Lin was recruited to direct The Fast and the Furious: Tokyo Drift, he pitched the idea of adding an Asian character to be the "cool guy" specifically with Han Lue in mind. Kang was only supposed to appear in a one-off but was brought back in the subsequent prequel films due to positive responses from audiences.

== Appearances ==
=== Better Luck Tomorrow ===
Director Justin Lin and portrayer Sung Kang have both stated in interviews that the Han seen in the Fast & Furious franchise is the same character featured in Better Luck Tomorrow, with that film serving as the character's origin story. In the film, Han and his friends, still in high school, engage in more and more criminal activities until they accidentally kill someone. Han's cousin is left with brain damage after attempting suicide.

=== The Fast and the Furious: Tokyo Drift ===
Living in Tokyo, Han uses his new-found wealth to start his own garage, as well as purchasing various expensive, modified tuner cars to store in the garage. Han also keeps himself occupied with various women, with a club attached next door to his garage. Additionally, he becomes involved with Tokyo's elite street racers and one of its most prominent drifters. At some point, he acquired a 2001 Nissan Silvia S15 Spec-S and rebuilt and restored it from the ground up, the car later being referred to by Twinkie as the Mona Lisa of the Drifting world.

Han also affiliates himself with Takashi, the nephew of Kamata, a Yakuza boss, securing profits from various business ventures. Unbeknownst to either Kamata and Takashi, Han begins stealing money from their operation and does so without either of them noticing for some time.

Han meets Sean Boswell when Boswell crosses Takashi's unspoken boundaries by speaking to his girlfriend, Neela. Han questions why Takashi is still bothering with “high school girls” when Takashi decides to confront Sean. When Sean accepts Takashi's challenge to drift, Han gives Sean the keys to his Nissan Silvia, curious to see what Sean is made of.

While Sean loses the race, wrecking his car in the process, Han is intrigued by what he saw in Sean for merely challenging Takashi. The following day, Han meets Sean outside of his school and demands that he get into his car. Han makes a point to tell Sean that he is in his debt and would be his personal “errand boy” on account of the car that he owes him. Sean is willing to agree to the terms so long as Han teaches him how to drift.

When Sean falls out of favor with his father, Lieutenant Boswell, Sean comes to live in Han's garage. While there, he works on the cars available to him in the garage and Han teaches him how to drift properly. As Sean improves, Han's situation is complicated when Takashi becomes more forceful in threatening Sean to stay away from Neela.

Eventually Takashi confronts Han about the money he has been stealing from his uncle. Han does not attempt to defend his actions to Takashi, he merely states that the "side deals" he made while under the protection of Takashi's word were in the nature of their business. He goes on to say that Takashi needed him and that he would've amounted to nothing if it was not for his help. When Takashi becomes distracted by the presence of Neela, Han takes his chance and climbs into his car and escapes. Takashi and his friend Morimoto pursue him through the streets of Tokyo, but they are unable to catch him. Han protects Sean and Neela from Takashi, allowing them to get ahead of him. When Han finally reaches the intersection of the road, Han's car is t-boned by a Mercedes S-Class. Han's car is flipped onto its top. Han, unable to escape the car, is supposedly killed in the explosion.

Sometime after Han's death, Sean Boswell meets Dominic Toretto after he requests an audience with him at the parking garage. Dom races Sean with the 1970 Plymouth Road Runner he won from Han years before.

=== Los Bandoleros ===
In Los Bandoleros, Han visited Mexico, where he met Dominic "Dom" Toretto and established a friendship. Han begins “running” with Dom for unspecified reasons. Dom wins the 1970 Plymouth Road Runner off of Han in a race.

Han arrives in the Dominican Republic when Toretto is preparing for a new job regarding the transportation of gas. He is picked up at the airport by Dom's friends Cara and Malo and is later taken to Rico Santos' house, where Dominic lives, and they have dinner with the rest of the Santos family. He takes an immediate attraction to Cara, who shares a mutual attraction for him.

Later, he follows Dom and Santos to the prison where Tego Leo was being kept before Santos helped him escape. When Dominic takes them to a secluded club to meet the man responsible for the transport of their score, Dominic tells him to drive around the block or wait in the car. Han instead decides to enter the club where he mingles with Cara and Malo at the bar.

When Cara asked how he met Dom, Han briefly explained how they first met each other in Mexico. Malo, realizing that the two were attracted to each other, asked if they wanted a room. Cara instead gives him her drink and she and Han leave the bar.

=== Fast & Furious ===
Han is seen only in the beginning of Fast & Furious. He along with Letty Ortiz, Toretto, Tego Leo, Rico Santos, and Cara (Han's then-girlfriend), are hijacking a fuel tanker in the Dominican Republic. Han and Cara hijack the first two tankers while Leo and Santos hijack the other two tankers, not before the truck driver gives them a little problem after seeing Letty on top of the tanker and notices that the hijacking is going on. After the hijacking is done, Toretto learns from Han that the authorities are investigating their previous locations and heists, leading to the disbanding of the crew. Toretto and Han part on good terms, with Han expressing interest in going to Tokyo, indicating that this takes place before the events of Tokyo Drift.

=== Fast Five ===
Han is recruited for a heist in the events of Fast Five as a precision driver and a "chameleon". During the events of the film, he starts to fall in love with another member of the crew, Gisele Yashar. When Brian and Dom are chased by corrupt cops under Hernan Reyes payroll, he and Roman come to their aid by knocking out the police cars. At the end of the film, Han and Gisele are seen traveling Europe, wealthy from the heist and in a relationship.

=== Fast & Furious 6 ===
When Han and Gisele arrive in London, they're given the details of their situation with Owen Shaw and Letty Ortiz by Luke Hobbs. During their first encounter with Shaw's team, Han, Brian and Gisele are attacked by the sniper Adolfson, who fires on their cars once they reach Interpol.

Brian, Han and Gisele are pinned down long enough for Vegh, Jah and Klaus to escape. Brian follows after them, but Gisele runs out into the open to fire on Jan and Klaus's getaway car. At the last second, Han is able to pull her out of the way and the two take cover behind a post box as Adolfson fires on them multiple times before escaping.

During the team's attempt to stop Owen and his team from hijacking the military convoy, Han and Gisele pursue Denlinger on their motorcycles, a Harley-Davidson XR1200 and Ducati Monster. Gisele is the first to reach Denlinger, hangs on the side of his Range Rover and is nearly crushed on the side of oncoming truck, but Han jumps onto the Range Rover in time to swerve the vehicle out of the way and save her life.

When Mia Toretto is taken prisoner by Shaw, Dominic and the others are forced to let Shaw and Riley Hicks, a double agent working with both Owen and Hobbs, go to ensure her safety. However, as soon as they're allowed, they go after the plane Shaw is planning to take off on with Mia. Gisele and Han are one of two teams designated with the task of keeping the plane on the ground using the harpoons. During their efforts, Gisele is pulled out of their car by Adolfson. Han follows after her, climbing onto the top of their car.

Though Gisele is able to fend him off, she is knocked off of Adolfson's car. Han is able to save her at the last moment. Gisele, realizing that Adolfson is about to kill Han, lets go of Han's arms and allows herself to fall, Han is unable to save her. Before she is killed from the fall, she shoots Adolfson, knocking him off balance. A devastated Han attacks Adolfson and throws him off of the car and into the jet engine of the plane, resulting in the death of Adolfson and the destruction of the engine.

The plane crashes. Dominic escapes the burning plane by car. Mia and Brian approach Han and attempt to comfort him when they realize what has happened to Gisele.

With their records cleared by the pardons provided by Hobbs, Han and the others return to Los Angeles. While speaking with Roman Pearce and Tej Parker, Han ultimately decides to go to Tokyo.

In the post-credits scene of Fast and Furious 6, Han's death from The Fast and the Furious: Tokyo Drift is shown and it is revealed that Owen's brother Deckard Shaw drove the Mercedes that crashed into Han's car and caused his death.

=== Furious 7 ===
Han's death is seen again in Furious 7 through archival footage from The Fast and the Furious: Tokyo Drift and Fast & Furious 6, occurring at the same time the same pack bomb delivered to Dominic's house goes off. Han's death was the reason Dominic appeared in Tokyo at the end of Tokyo Drift - to retrieve his body back to Los Angeles for burial. After racing with Sean Boswell, Dominic receives several of Han's personal items, including a photo of Gisele. The crew attended Han's funeral in Los Angeles a few days later, with Dominic spotting Han's killer Deckard Shaw watching from a distance, and giving chase, leading to their confrontation.

=== F9 ===
While on a mission that would lead them to Tokyo, Letty and Mia discover that Han is alive, having used Deckard Shaw's attack on him to fake his death with the help of Mr. Nobody. He explains that after the death of Gisele, Mr. Nobody had approached him as Gisele was once an operative under his supervision, believing he was trustworthy due to their relationship. Agreeing to work for him, Mr. Nobody helped Han fake his death at the hands of Shaw and keep his survival a secret, becoming an agent in order to keep focused and possibly heal from Gisele's death.

These events would imply that Han is the reason why Mr. Nobody would assist Dom and the crew in their fight against Deckard Shaw.

One day on a mission, Han witnessed the assassination of his targets, the parents of a girl named Elle, who were in possession of a powerful weapon called Project Aries, which can instantly take control of the entire world's computerized and nuclear power. While she hid from the assassins, Han intervened and killed them to save her, deciding to take Elle in and protect her from the man who sent them, an aristocrat named Otto. During this time, both he and Elle formed a sibling bond, one that helped him move on from Gisele. He then returns with Elle to rejoin Dom's team and help stop Otto and Cipher's plan of acquiring Aries, of which Elle's DNA is the key to its activation. Although Otto and Dom's brother Jakob later kidnap Elle, Han helps the team rescue her and stop the activation of Aries.

He is later seen among the several members at the partially re-built Toretto house in L.A., reuniting with his Tokyo crew: Sean, Twinkie and Earl, who are overjoyed to see him alive. He joins the Toretto and Tokyo crew at the table for a dinner meal, alongside Elle, waiting for Brian O'Conner to arrive.

The film's end credit scene shows Deckard Shaw is interrogating a Russian criminal before answering the door to shockingly find Han, who has come to confront the man who tried to kill him.

=== Fast X ===
Han returns to help the Agency with a mission in Rome along with Dominic, Letty, Tej, Roman, and Ramsey. However, the mission is revealed to be a trap set by Dante Reyes. With the Agency (under new corrupt leadership) coming after the team, Han is forced to obtain help from Deckard Shaw. In Portugal, Han, Roman, Tej and Ramsey board a plane to rescue Dom and his son at the dam from Dante and Aimes, who is revealed to be a double agent working with Dante shoots with a rocket launcher causing the plane to crash, leaving Han's fate alongside the fates of Roman, Tej and Ramsey unknown.

== Characterization ==
Han is known for frequently snacking. As pointed out by Gisele in Fast Five, this is part of his constant need to occupy his hands, as he is a former smoker. According to director Justin Lin, this is an Easter egg reference to the character's previous appearance in Better Luck Tomorrow.

Following the death of Gisele in Fast & Furious 6, Han leaves the United States to live in Tokyo, setting up his appearance in The Fast and the Furious: Tokyo Drift. Han was initially the only character from Tokyo Drift to appear in the subsequent films, before Sean Boswell's appearance in Furious 7. Both Sung Kang and Justin Lin have stated the surname "Seoul-Oh" that Han uses in Fast Five, Fast & Furious 6 and Furious 7 is a fake ID, a play on the name "Han Solo". The revelation that Han Lue is alive in F9 encouraged the use of the #HanIsAlive hashtag that Star Wars fans thought was referring to Han Solo, who died in Star Wars: The Force Awakens.

== Relationships ==
In the short film Los Bandoleros and the film Fast & Furious, he was in a relationship with Cara Mirtha until they broke up by the time the events of Fast Five takes place. At the end of the film and all of Fast & Furious 6 he was in a relationship with Gisele Yashar until her apparent death in the battle versus the henchmen of Owen Shaw, the middle brother of Deckard Shaw.

== Car list ==
Film	Car
Better Luck Tomorrow	1965 Ford Mustang
The Fast and the Furious: Tokyo Drift	1997 Mazda RX-7, with Veilside body kit
Fast & Furious	1967 Chevrolet C-Series, with a custom tail trailer and truck tires
Fast Five	1970 Ford Maverick
Fast Five	2011 Subaru Impreza WRX STI
Fast Five	2011 Dodge Charger R/T Police Car
Fast Five	2010 Lexus LFA
Fast & Furious 6	2010 BMW E60 M5; 2012 Dodge Charger SRT8; 1997 Mazda RX-7, with Veilside body kit (archival footage)
F9	2020 Toyota GR Supra
F9	2011 STC Delta Didgori-2
Fast X	1971 Alfa Romeo 2000 GT Veloce
