= The Fast and the Furious: Tokyo Drift =

2006 film by Justin Lin

- Theatrical release poster
- Directed by: Justin Lin
- Written by: Chris Morgan
- Produced by: Neal H. Moritz
- Starring: Lucas Black; Bow Wow
- Cinematography: Stephen F. Windon
- Edited by: Fred Raskin; Kelly Matsumoto
- Music by: Brian Tyler
- Production companies: Universal Pictures; Relativity Media; Neal H. Moritz Productions
- Distributed by: Universal Pictures (North America); United International Pictures (International)
- Release dates: June 4, 2006 (Gibson Amphitheatre); June 16, 2006 (United States)
- Running time: 104 minutes
- Country: United States
- Language: English
- Budget: $85 million
- Box office: $159 million

The Fast and the Furious: Tokyo Drift is a 2006 American action film directed by Justin Lin and written by Chris Morgan. It is a standalone sequel to The Fast and the Furious (2001) and 2 Fast 2 Furious (2003), and the third installment in the Fast & Furious franchise. It is set between Fast & Furious 6 (2013) and Furious 7 (2015). It stars Lucas Black and Bow Wow. In the film, the car enthusiast Sean Boswell (Black) is sent to live in Tokyo with his estranged father and finds solace exploring the city's drifting community.

A third Fast & Furious film was confirmed in June 2005, when Lin was selected as director. Morgan was hired after an open call soon after, thus marking the first film in the franchise's longtime association with Lin, Morgan, actor Sung Kang, and composer Brian Tyler. Principal photography began in August 2005 and lasted until that November, with filming locations including Los Angeles and Tokyo, making Tokyo Drift the first film in the franchise to feature an international filming location.

The film premiered at Gibson Amphitheatre in Los Angeles on June 4, 2006, and was released in the United States on June 16, by Universal Pictures. It grossed $159 million worldwide, making it the lowest-grossing film in the franchise. The film received mixed reviews from critics, with praise for its driving sequences but criticism for its screenplay and acting performances. In subsequent years, Tokyo Drift has garnered a more favorable view, with some critics considering it one of the best of the franchise. The next installment, Fast & Furious, was released in 2009.

== Plot ==
In Oro Valley, Arizona, high school troublemaker Sean Boswell races classmate Clay in their respective cars, a 1971 Chevy Monte Carlo and a 2003 Dodge Viper SRT-10, where they end up ramming each other with Clay crashing his Viper into a cylinder pipe and Sean winning the race and wrecking his Monte Carlo. While Clay's family wealth helps him escape punishment, Sean is sent to live with his father, a U.S. Navy lieutenant stationed in Tokyo, to avoid jail time, as he is a repeat offender.

Sean befriends military brat Twinkie, who introduces him to drift racing. Driving to an underground car meet in Twinkie's 2005 Hulk-themed Volkswagen Touran, Sean gets into a confrontation with Takashi, the "Drift King" (DK), over Takashi's girlfriend Neela. Sean agrees to race Takashi's Nissan 350Z in a Nissan Silvia S15 lent to him by retired drift racer Han Lue, only to lose and severely damage the Silvia due to his unfamiliarity with drifting. To repay the debt, Sean agrees to work for Han.

Han begins teaching drifting to Sean, whom he mentions as the only person ever to stand up to Takashi, due to his uncle, Kamata, being a member of the yakuza. Sean masters the art, practicing in a 2003 Mitsubishi Lancer Evolution VIII, and gains further respect after defeating Takashi's lieutenant, Morimoto. Han and Sean become friends.

Sean eventually asks Neela out on a date; Neela explains that after her mother died, she moved in with Takashi's grandmother. An irate Takashi assaults Sean the next day, telling him to stay away from Neela. Neela leaves Takashi and moves in with Sean and Han.

After Kamata reprimands Takashi for allowing Han to steal from him, Takashi and Morimoto confront Han, Sean, and Neela. Takashi threatens Han with a gun, and Han, Sean and Neela flee after Twinkie creates a distraction. Takashi and Morimoto pursue the trio, with Morimoto crashing and dying, and Han buying Sean and Neela time to escape. The chase ends when Sean and Neela's Evo crashes, while Han's 1994 Mazda RX-7 Veilside is T-boned by a 1992 Mercedes-Benz W140 (Note: Later revealed to have been driven by Deckard Shaw to kill Han in Fast & Furious 6 (2013)) and then explodes, killing him. Takashi later draws a gun on Sean, but his father draws on Takashi; the standoff ends when Neela agrees to leave with Takashi. Sean and his father make amends, while Twinkie gives money to Sean to compensate Kamata for the stolen funds. Sean delivers the cash to Kamata and challenges Takashi to a drift, with the loser leaving Tokyo. Kamata agrees, with Takashi's condition they downhill-drift a mountain pass that only he has descended successfully. Sean and Han's crew restore a 1967 Ford Mustang Fastback that Sean's father recovered and tune it to drift specifications, making use of the engine and other components from the wrecked S15.

On the mountain, Takashi initially leads, but Sean's practice and training allow him to catch up. Desperate, Takashi rams Sean repeatedly. On one of these attempts, Sean slows dramatically, causing Takashi to miss and crash off a cliff, narrowly missing Sean as he reached the finish line. Kamata honors his word, and Sean, dubbed the new Drift King, remains in Tokyo. Neela, Twinkie, and Sean, now driving an Nissan Silvia S15 Spec-R, enjoy themselves at a car meet when Dominic Toretto arrives in a 1970 Plymouth Road Runner to challenge Sean to a race. Sean is initially hesitant, but accepts after Dom proclaims Han was family.

== Cast ==
- Lucas Black as Sean Boswell: A young man interested in street racing.
- Bow Wow as "Twinkie": Sean's first friend he meets in Tokyo, who sells various consumer goods and introduces Sean to drift racing.
- Sung Kang as Han Lue: DK's business partner and old friend of Dominic Toretto, who befriends Sean and teaches him how to drift.
- Brian Tee as Takashi: Sean's enemy who is acknowledged as the best drift racer and given the title "Drift King", or simply "D.K.".
- Nathalie Kelley as Neela Ezar: Takashi's girlfriend who later falls for Sean.
- Sonny Chiba (credited as JJ Sonny Chiba) as Kamata: Takashi's uncle who is the head of the yakuza.
- Leonardo Nam as Morimoto: Takashi's right-hand man.
- Brian Goodman as Lieutenant Boswell: Sean's father.
- Zachery Ty Bryan as Clay: The quarterback of Sean's school whom Sean races at the beginning of the film.
- Lynda Boyd as Ms. Boswell: Sean's mother who is fed up with moving them around and sends him to Tokyo, Japan to live with his father.
- Jason Tobin as Earl: One of Han's friends who specializes in tuning the cars, along with Reiko.
- Keiko Kitagawa as Reiko: Earl's friend and fellow tuner.
- Nikki Griffin as Cindy: Clay's girlfriend, who suggests that Clay and Sean race to win her.
- Satoshi Tsumabuki as Exceedingly Handsome Guy: Who starts the first race between Sean and Takashi (cameo)
- Keiichi Tsuchiya as an elderly fisherman (uncredited cameo)
- Kazutoshi Wadakura as an elderly fisherman (uncredited cameo)
- Vin Diesel as Dominic Toretto (uncredited cameo)

=== Character development after the events of Tokyo Drift ===
Han Lue went on to make a brief appearance in Fast & Furious (2009) before returning as a main character in Fast Five, Fast & Furious 6, F9 and Fast X. Sean Boswell, Twinkie and Earl also returned to the series in F9. During the events of F9, Boswell, Twinkie and Earl had left Japan and were involved in rocket development in Germany. How they came from their circumstances of the Japanese drift scene to their work in the military industry is not explained in the series. They are shown testing rockets by attaching them to the top of motor vehicles, which came to use in F9.

== Production ==
=== Development ===
"After I'd seen Better Luck Tomorrow, I knew Justin was a director I wanted to do business with. He was the first we approached, and he loved the idea of filming it. This movie needed enthusiasm, and he was the director to do it."

— Producer Neal H. Moritz

Writer Chris Morgan was a fan of the Fast & Furious series, and the producers had an open writing call for the third film. Morgan originally pitched Dominic Toretto in Tokyo, learning to drift and solving a murder, but Universal Pictures wanted a high school-themed story.

By 2005, Paul Walker, who played Brian O'Conner in the first two installments, no longer showed interest in the franchise, citing "politics, studio stuff and regime decision". Vin Diesel, who didn't appear already in the second movie and at the time was busy with the xXx and The Chronicles of Riddick franchises, also turned down the role, leading the film being ordered as a new stand-alone reboot.

Neal H. Moritz, who had produced the two previous installments, began working on the film in 2005. In June 2005, Moritz hired Justin Lin to direct it. Lin, who wasn't intimately familiar with drifting at the time, recalled, "I was in film school when The Fast and the Furious came out, and I saw it along with a sold-out crowd who just ate it up. What really excited me about directing this film was the chance to harness that energy—create a whole new chapter and up the ante by bringing something new to the table for the audience who loves action and speed." Lin was not enthusiastic at first and was unimpressed by earlier drafts of the script, saying, "I think it's offensive and dated, and I don't have any intention of doing it." The producers allowed him to develop the film in his own way, although it was a constant challenge and he was always battling Universal to make the film better, but Lin said that "to their credit, they were very fair and reasonable."

It was impossible to get the necessary filming permits in Tokyo, so they went ahead without permission. According to Lin, "I wanted to shoot in Shibuya, which is the most crowded place in Tokyo. The cops, they're all so polite, so it takes ten minutes for them to come over and kick you out." Unknown to Lin, the studio had hired a fall guy, who stepped in when the police came to arrest him, and said he was the director and spent the night in jail instead.

Following respectable test screenings of The Fast and the Furious: Tokyo Drift, Universal still felt it needed a star cameo appearance; Vin Diesel agreed to reprise his role as Dominic Toretto for a brief cameo, in exchange for Universal's ownership to rights of the Riddick character, in lieu of financial payment.

The series itself, being in a stage where most of the main cast were not involved, was in a precarious state where the movie may have actually been released straight to video, however it was in the end decided to release it to cinemas.

=== Technical ===
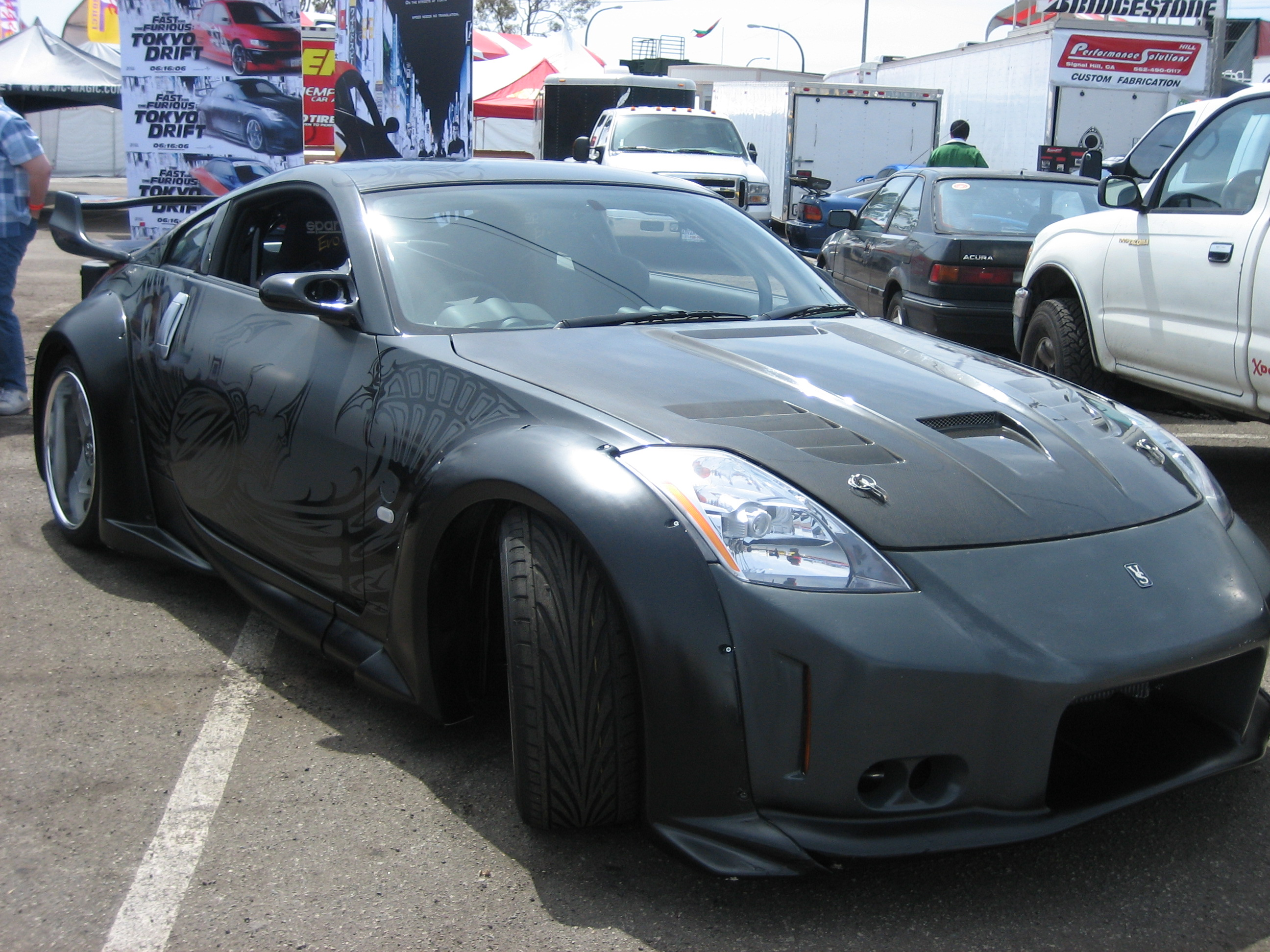
Nissan Fairlady Z (Z33) Driven by Takashi (D.K.)

Races and stunts were coordinated by Terry J. Leonard, who also served as second unit director. The film used almost 250 vehicles, cutting up 25 and destroying more than 80.

The Nissan Silvia which Sean trashes in his first race in Japan is depicted as having an RB26DETT engine swap which itself is donated to the Ford Mustang. However, besides one sequence with the exposed engine, the car in the movie was actually powered by the Silvia's original engine. The Veilside body-kitted Mazda RX-7, (dubbed "Fortune"), driven by Han was originally built by Veilside for the 2005 Tokyo Auto Salon, but was later bought by Universal and repainted from dark red, to orange and black, for use in the movie. The car in which Dominic appears in at the end of the film is a highly customized 1970 Plymouth Road Runner, which was built for the SEMA Show.

SCC tested the cars of the film, and noted that the cars in Tokyo Drift were slightly faster in an acceleration match up with the cars from 2 Fast 2 Furious.

Notable drifting personalities Keiichi Tsuchiya (who also made an uncredited cameo in the film), Rhys Millen, and Samuel Hübinette were consulted and employed by the movie to provide and execute the drifting and driving stunts in the film. Nobushige Kumakubo, Kazuhiro Tanaka, Tanner Foust, Rich Rutherford, Calvin Wan and Alex Pfeiffer were also brought in as none of Universal's own stunt drivers could drift. Some racing events were filmed within the Hawthorne Mall parking lot in Los Angeles, as filming in Tokyo required permits the studio was unable to obtain. They instead used street lights and multiple props to help recreate Tokyo.

Toshi Hayama was also brought in to keep elements of the film portrayed correctly, who was contacted by Roger Fan, an old high school friend who starred in Lin's Better Luck Tomorrow. Hayama ensured certain references were deployed correctly, such as the use of nitrous oxide in straights but not in turns, and keeping the use of references to sponsors to a minimum. One of Kamata's henchmen has missing fingers, a punishment typically deployed by the yakuza. He had to have the missing fingers digitally added in to appease cultural concerns.

=== Music ===
The Fast and the Furious: Tokyo Drift (Original Motion Picture Soundtrack), composed of 12 songs, was released on June 20, 2006, through Universal Motown. It features contributions from Don Omar, Teriyaki Boyz, Atari Teenage Riot, Brian Tyler, DJ Shadow, Dragon Ash, Evil Nine, Far East Movement, Mos Def, N⋆E⋆R⋆D, Tego Calderón and The 5.6.7.8's. Brian Tyler's Original Score was released on June 27 via Varèse Sarabande, a week after Original Motion Picture Soundtrack.

== Release ==
The Fast and the Furious: Tokyo Drift was first screened at Gibson Amphitheatre in Los Angeles on June 4, 2006, and was released by Universal Pictures in the United States on June 16. The film itself had a limited release in Japan under the title Wild Speed 3.

=== Home media ===
The film was released on DVD and HD DVD on September 26, 2006. It was later released on Blu-ray Disc on March 24, 2009. Tokyo Drift was re-released on 4K Ultra HD Blu-ray on October 2, 2018.

== Reception ==
=== Box office ===
The Fast and the Furious: Tokyo Drift brought in $9,731,805 on its opening day, and grossed over $23,973,840 during its opening weekend, debuting at number three at the North American box office behind Cars ($33.7 million) and Nacho Libre ($28.3 million). It was the first film in the Fast & Furious series not to open at number one. According to opening weekend audience polling conducted by Universal Pictures, 58% of moviegoers were male, while 60% were under the age of 25.

The film ultimately grossed $62,514,415 in the United States and Canada and an additional $96,450,195 in international markets, for a worldwide total of $158,964,610, becoming the lowest-grossing film in the Fast & Furious franchise. International receipts accounted for approximately 61% of the film's worldwide gross, exceeding its domestic earnings by nearly $34 million.

=== Critical response ===
Tokyo Drift gained a 38% approval rating on Rotten Tomatoes based on reviews from 141 critics; the average rating is 5/10. Users of the site however, have bestowed a 69% approval rating on the film. The site's consensus reads: "Eye-popping driving sequences coupled with a limp story and flat performances make this Drift a disappointing follow-up to previous Fast and Furious installments." On Metacritic, the film has a weighted average score of 45 out of 100 based on reviews from 32 critics, indicating "mixed or average reviews". Audiences surveyed by CinemaScore gave the film a grade A− on a scale of A to F.

Roger Ebert of the Chicago Sun-Times gave Tokyo Drift three out of four, saying that Lin "takes an established franchise and makes it surprisingly fresh and intriguing... [Tokyo Drift is] more observant than we expect ... The story [is] about something more than fast cars". Michael Sragow of The Baltimore Sun felt that "the opening half-hour may prove to be a disreputable classic of pedal-to-the-metal filmmaking" and "the last downhill race is a doozy". Kirk Honeycutt of The Hollywood Reporter said that "it's not much of a movie, but a hell of a ride". Todd McCarthy of Variety gave the film a positive review and praised the "good, old-fashioned genre filmmaking done in a no-nonsense, unpretentious style", adding it "stays in high gear most of the way with several exhilarating racing sequences, and benefits greatly from the evocative Japanese setting". McCarthy particularly praised the work of stunt coordinator Terry Leonard.

Michael Medved gave Tokyo Drift one and a half out of four, saying: "There's no discernible plot, or emotion, or humor, but the final race is well-staged and nicely shot... The main achievement of this vapid time-waster involves its promotion of new appreciation for the first two movies in the series." James Berardinelli wrote: "When it comes to eye candy, the film is on solid ground—it offers plenty of babes and cars (with the latter being more lovingly photographed than the former). However, it is unacceptable that the movie's action scenes (races and chases) are boring and incoherent. If the movie can't deliver on its most important asset, what's the point?" Richard Roeper wrote, "The whole thing is preposterous. The acting is so awful, some of the worst performances I've seen in a long, long time." Ethan Alter of Premiere was particularly critical of Black's character: "Sean makes so many dumb decisions it's a wonder that anyone wants to be associated with him." Peter Travers of Rolling Stone said that Tokyo Drift "suffers from blurred vision, motor drag and a plot that's running on fumes. Look out for a star cameo—it's the only surprise you'll get from this heap." Mick LaSalle of the San Francisco Chronicle thought "it quickly tanks, thanks to a lead character with no goals, focus, appeal or intelligence and a lead actor who's just a little too convincing at playing a dunce", adding: "As for the racing scenes, who cares about the finesse move of drifting, compared to going fast? And who wants to watch guys race in a parking lot?" Matt Singer of Village Voice called it "a subculture in search of a compelling story line, and Black's leaden performance makes you pine for the days of Paul Walker." Rob Cohen, who directed the first film of the series, said: "If you were to just watch Tokyo Drift, you'd say 'I never want to see anything related to Fast & Furious again.'"

=== Retrospective reviews ===
In critics' rankings of the series, Tokyo Drift had in the past often appeared on the bottom of the list. However, over time it has been seen more favorably, and was ranked second best in ranked lists of all the Fast movies by IndieWire, The Washington Post, TheWrap, Screen Rant, and Collider. Esquire magazine and BuzzFeed News ranked it the best of the series.

It has become a favorite with car enthusiasts, seen as the film in the series most specifically dealing with car culture and focusing on cars themselves. Critics and fans have come to appreciate Tokyo Drift for introducing Sung Kang and Justin Lin to the franchise, and enjoyed the simple story, stylish direction, and that the film never takes itself too seriously. As the film series became more elaborate and incorporated less realistic storylines including heists and spying, the relative simplicity of Tokyo Drift has become more appreciated by critics. Tokyo Drift has been described as "the movie that kept the series alive" since "Vin Diesel abandoned his other projects, and came back—with Lin at the helm". In a 2020 interview, Christopher Nolan said that although the first film was his favorite, he had a "soft spot" for Tokyo Drift.

=== Accolades ===
Award	Category	Nominee	Result	Ref.
Teen Choice Awards	Choice Movie: Male Breakout Star	Lucas Black	Nominated	
Teen Choice Awards	Choice Summer Movie: Action/Drama	The Fast and the Furious: Tokyo Drift	Nominated	

== Legacy ==
Tokyo Drift was mostly ignored in later films until Furious 7, while the character Han Lue originally appeared as a short cameo from director Justin Lin's 2002 film, Better Luck Tomorrow. After Han's apparent death in Tokyo Drift, his character was retconned into Dominic Toretto's crew for three subsequent sequels: Fast & Furious, Fast Five, and Fast & Furious 6, which are set before the events of Tokyo Drift.

Han's death was revisited in Fast & Furious 6, revealing that his fatal crash was intentional. In Furious 7, it was also revealed that Deckard Shaw, seeking revenge for his brother Owen Shaw, was driving the Mercedes Benz that T-boned Han. As Deckard's redemption arc gained attention, fans rallied for Han's return to the series with the hashtag #JusticeForHan.

In F9, Han's "death" was revealed to have been an illusion, staged to keep him under the radar for the events that would unfold in Fast X.
