= Gisele Yashar =

Fast & Furious fictional character

Gisele Yashar ג'יזל ישר
- Fast & Furious character
- Gal Gadot as Gisele Yashar
- First appearance: Fast & Furious (2009)
- Created by: Chris Morgan
- Portrayed by: Gal Gadot

In-universe information
- Alias: Gisele Harabo
- Gender: Female
- Occupation: Liaison; Weapons expert; Former CIA operative agent; Former Mossad agent
- Significant other: Han Lue
- Nationality: Israel
- Affiliation: Crew members: Dominic Toretto; Brian O'Conner; Letty Ortiz; Mia Toretto; Vince (deceased); Han Lue (boyfriend); Rico Santos; Tego Leo; Roman Pearce; Tej Parker; Luke Hobbs
- Status: Alive

Gisele Yashar (Note: The name Gisele Harabo was used in production notes for the sixth film.) (Hebrew: ג'יזל ישר) is a fictional character portrayed by Israeli actress Gal Gadot who appears in the Fast & Furious franchise. Introduced as a supporting character in Fast & Furious (2009), she initially serves as a liaison for drug lord Arturo Braga. Yashar later joins Dominic Toretto's team in Fast Five (2011), where she forms a romantic relationship with Han Lue. She returns to help fight against Owen Shaw in Fast & Furious 6 (2013), where her character is supposedly killed. However, Fast X (2023) reveals that she is still alive.

Gisele was Gadot's first major film role, and she believes director Justin Lin cast her due to her military background. Gadot also performed her own stunts while filming the movies.

Media outlets characterized Gisele through her sexuality. Reactions to the character were mixed: some critics praised the representation of Gisele's sexuality and her relationship with Han while others felt her character was either unrealistic or represented a part of the franchise's poor treatment of women. Gadot's performance received positive feedback, and several commentators requested she reprise the role in a future film.

== Appearances ==
Gisele Yashar (Gal Gadot) is an ex-Mossad agent which shows that she was probably born in Israel. In F9, it is revealed that she had worked with the team's future government contact "Mr. Nobody" (Kurt Russell) during his time running drug operations for the CIA in South America.

=== Fast & Furious (2009) ===
Gisele is now a liaison for drug trafficker Arturo Braga (John Ortiz). She develops romantic feelings for Dominic Toretto (Vin Diesel), but he rejects her advances. She advises him about the dangers involved in smuggling heroin across the Mexico–United States border to complete a deal with Braga. The drug exchange results in an ambush instigated by Braga, with Toretto protecting Gisele. She helps Toretto by providing him with the location of Braga's hideout in Mexico.

=== Fast Five (2011) ===
As Dom and Brian are assembling a team to heist a hundred million dollars from Hernan Reyes, Dom calls in Gisele to join the team, describing her as someone who "isn't afraid to throw down".

Whilst trying to get Reyes' handprint to unlock his safe, she volunteers herself to assist Han Lue (Sung Kang). She approaches Reyes in a bikini and seduces him to put his hand on her underwear, thus perfectly printing his handprints there. This catches Han's attention and the two soon develop a romantic relationship.

During the Vault Heist, she poses as a garbage collector. Driving a garbage truck, she pushes along a fake vault which is swapped out with the real vault which is taken back to the safe house.

Following the completion of the mission, Gisele and Han are last shown speeding down the Autobahn, with Gisele sitting in his lap in a Lexus LFA.

=== Fast & Furious 6 (2013) ===
Gisele and Han are living together in Hong Kong. Toretto recruits the couple to prevent a heist planned by Owen Shaw (Luke Evans), which could potentially kill millions of people.

For the mission, Gisele draws on her Mossad experience with interrogation, weapons, and retrieval. She was able to extract information from one of Shaw's men using her interrogation techniques, and the group uncovered Shaw's connection to drug lord Arturo Braga.

While attempting to stop a plane, she is left hanging from the back of a Range Rover. Han attempts to rescue her, but Adolfson (Benjamin Davies), a member of Shaw's gang, uses the opportunity to try and kill him. Gisele lets go of Han's hand to shoot Adolfson, and apparently falls to her "death".

Han later kills Adolfson in revenge for Gisele's death. At the end of the film, Roman Pearce (Tyrese Gibson) says a blessing in Gisele's honor during grace.

=== Furious 7 (2015) ===
A photo of Gisele is shown in Han's personal belongings, and it is later placed in his coffin as part of his memorial service. A deleted scene revealed Gisele had found Letty Ortiz (Michelle Rodriguez) after she was nearly killed by Fenix Calderon (Laz Alonso) and took her to the hospital. Letty asked Gisele why she saved her, and Gisele responded: "Maybe you are the one saving me."

=== Fast X (2023) ===
Gisele is revealed to have survived her fall from the vehicle in Fast & Furious 6, as she appears in a submarine to rescue Letty and Cipher (Charlize Theron) from the Agency's Antarctica prison.

== Development ==
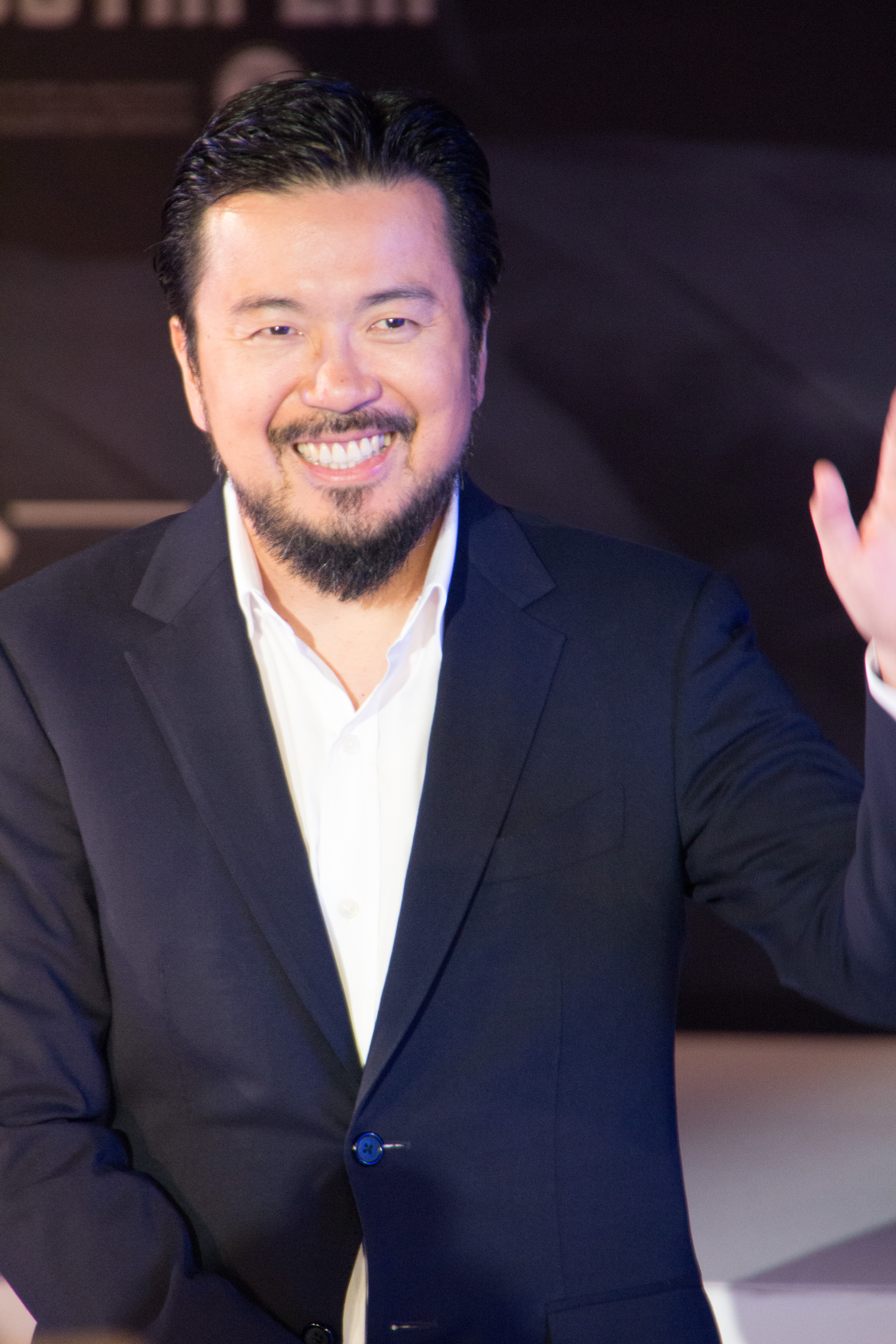
Justin Lin cast Gadot as Gisele

Gisele Yashar, a supporting character, was Gadot's first major film role, and the actress felt that it had a major impact on her career. She said that her unsuccessful experiences when trying out for Bond girl Camille Montes in the 22nd James Bond film Quantum of Solace (2008) had led to other auditions, specifically the one for Gisele. Regarding the decision to give Gisele a Mossad background, Gadot explained, "you don’t have to be Israeli to work with Mossad. Justin Lin and I knew we would be working on multiple films together, and we wanted her character to evolve. I think Justin really liked that I had served in the Israeli military and wanted to incorporate my knowledge of weapons into the role". In 2017, Gadot also thanked Diesel for his input over her selection for the role. Vanity Fair's Yohana Desta identified Gisele as "a breakthrough part that gave Gadot some mainstream recognition".

When discussing her initial response to the Fast & Furious franchise, Gadot said: "We don't do those kind of movies [in Israel], with those kind of standards". She performed her own stunts during the films, saying: "The adrenaline was just incredible and I enjoyed being able to do the stuff that in real life you can't." Gadot explained that she wanted to feel like a "tough girl" while shooting her scenes. For the character's return in Fast & Furious 6, Gadot told Lin that she wanted Gisele to "be more of a badass", and was given more stunt work for the film. Some of the stunts involved jumping from a moving motorcycle onto a Jeep, being suspended in a harness, and riding a Ducati Monster motorcycle. Media outlets also characterized Gisele through her sexuality; Fuse's Bianca Gracie referred to her as "sensual and intimidating", and The Stranger's Erik Henriksen called her a "villainous seductress".

Following Gadot's return in Fast X, Rodriguez commented that Gadot had previously filmed cameos in previous films after her character's "death" in the sixth one, though none of them made it into the final cuts, with Diesel admitting that "we have shot other things a long time ago that might not have fit that specific movie as a finale. Doing tags is a very tricky thing because you want your great talent but at the same time you have to be very careful to maintain the emotional state of your audience at the end of the movie. So that’s what you’re juggling".

== Critical reception ==
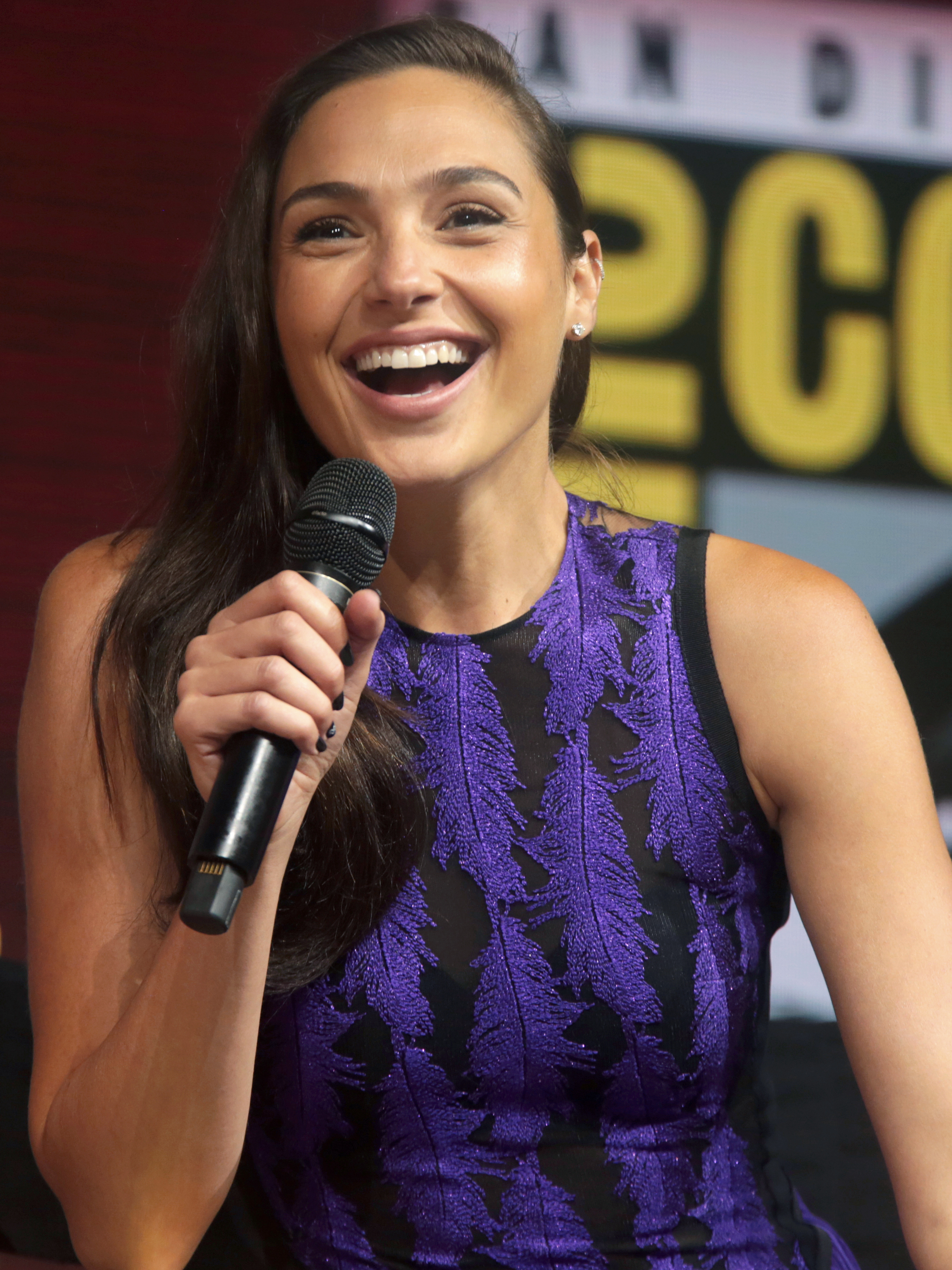
Gadot received a positive response for her performance.

Gisele Yashar has received a mixed response from film critics. Decider's Meghan O'Keefe praised Gisele as a new type of female character for the Fast & Furious franchise, writing that she provided a more "sophisticated, and unapologetically femme vibe" when compared to the rougher Ortiz. O'Keefe responded positively to Gisele's use of her sexuality and femininity as a tactic to manipulate men, as well as to her romance and partnership with Han. Nerdist News's Sydney Bucksbaum also identified the character's relationship with Han as a highlight, writing that they became "one of the most iconic couples from all the movies".

Some commentators had a more negative response to the character. The A.V. Club's Tom Breihan felt that Gisele's transformation from "a drug lord's envoy to a former Mossad agent and a badass killer" was part of how the franchise gave "implausible makeovers" to certain characters. IndieWire's Kate Erbland included Gisele's death as an example of the franchise's poor treatment of women; she explained that female characters, such as Gisele, "primarily exist to round out the storylines of the films' male characters, often as love interests" and are rarely brought into focus as individuals.

Gadot's performance received positive feedback from critics. In a 2017 article, Heavy.com's Brendan Marrow listed Gisele as one of Gadot's best performances prior to her starring role as Wonder Woman in the 2017 film of the same name. O’Keefe of Decider described Gadot and her character as the "secret weapon" of the Fast & Furious franchise, praising the actress for her "totally kickass contribution to the bonkers, high-octane, super-charged [films]". O'Keefe described Gadot's performance as "balanc[ing] unbridled badassery with unabashedly feminine charm". Joe Reid, also writing for Decider, recommended that Gisele should be revived for future installments of the franchise, but questioned if the producers could afford to have Gadot return for another film. Bucksbaum campaigned for the character's return, and wrote that she could likely be featured in a future film through a flashback sequence.
