= Honor Roll (disambiguation) =

Honor Roll may refer to:

- Honor roll, a list of honors students
- Honor Rolls of Baseball, established in 1946
- Honour Roll Clasp, a decoration of Nazi Germany during World War II
- The Honor Roll, a band later known as We Shot the Moon

== See also ==
- Honor Roll Murder, the murder of Stuart Tay
- Roll of Honour (disambiguation)
- Tasmanian Honour Roll of Women, an Australian register that honours the achievements of women in the state of Tasmania
- Victorian Honour Roll of Women, an Australian register that honours the achievements of women in the state of Victoria
