= Roll of Honour =

Roll of Honour may refer to:

- A war memorial
- A list of people who are praised officially for something they have done
- A memorial list of names of people who have died in military, police service or other services
- "Roll of Honour" (song), an Irish Republican song praising the participants in the 1981 Irish Hunger Strike

== See also ==
- Honor Roll (disambiguation)
- Role of Honour, a 1984 James Bond novel by John Gardner
