= F9 (film) =

2021 film by Justin Lin

- Theatrical release poster
- Directed by: Justin Lin
- Screenplay by: Daniel Casey; Justin Lin
- Story by: Justin Lin; Alfredo Botello; Daniel Casey
- Based on: Characters by Gary Scott Thompson
- Produced by: Neal H. Moritz; Vin Diesel; Justin Lin; Jeffrey Kirschenbaum; Joe Roth; Clayton Townsend; Samantha Vincent
- Starring: Vin Diesel; Michelle Rodriguez; Tyrese Gibson; Chris "Ludacris" Bridges; John Cena; Nathalie Emmanuel; Jordana Brewster; Sung Kang; Helen Mirren; Kurt Russell; Charlize Theron
- Cinematography: Stephen F. Windon
- Edited by: Dylan Highsmith; Kelly Matsumoto; Greg D'Auria
- Music by: Brian Tyler
- Production companies: Universal Pictures; Original Film; One Race Films; Perfect Storm Entertainment; Roth/Kirschenbaum Films
- Distributed by: Universal Pictures
- Release dates: May 19, 2021 (South Korea); June 25, 2021 (United States)
- Running time: 143 minutes
- Country: United States
- Language: English
- Budget: $200–225 million
- Box office: $726.2 million

F9 (also known as F9: The Fast Saga or Fast & Furious 9) is a 2021 American action film directed by Justin Lin, who co-wrote the screenplay with Daniel Casey. The sequel to The Fate of the Furious (2017), it is the ninth mainline installment and the tenth installment overall in the Fast & Furious franchise. It stars Vin Diesel as Dominic "Dom" Toretto, alongside Michelle Rodriguez, Tyrese Gibson, Chris "Ludacris" Bridges, John Cena, Nathalie Emmanuel, Jordana Brewster, Sung Kang, Michael Rooker, Helen Mirren, Kurt Russell, and Charlize Theron. In the film, Dom and his team aim to stop his estranged brother Jakob Toretto and his financier, Otto, from activating Project Aries, a dangerous advanced weapons program.

With a ninth film planned since 2014, Lin was confirmed as director in October 2017, returning to the franchise since directing Fast & Furious 6 (2013). F9 is the first film in the franchise since 2 Fast 2 Furious (2003) to not be written by Chris Morgan. Dwayne Johnson, who appeared in the previous four films, was announced to return in April 2017, but confirmed his absence in January 2019. The rest of the cast was finalized with the addition of John Cena six months later. Brian Tyler returned to compose the score. Principal photography began in June 2019 and lasted until that November, with filming locations including London, Edinburgh, Tbilisi, Los Angeles and Thailand.

F9 was originally scheduled for release by Universal Pictures on April 19, 2019, but was delayed several times due to the release of the spin-off film Hobbs & Shaw (2019), the planned release of Metro-Goldwyn-Mayer's James Bond film No Time to Die (2021), and the COVID-19 pandemic. It was first released in South Korea on May 19, 2021, and then released in the United States on June 25. The film received mixed reviews from critics, with praise for the stunts, Lin's direction, action sequences and the performances of the cast, while it was criticized for its plot and revision of tropes. It set several pandemic box office records and grossed $726.2 million worldwide, becoming the fifth-highest-grossing film of 2021. It was followed by Fast X in 2023.

== Plot ==
In 1989, Jack Toretto participates in a late model race on a short track, with his sons Dominic "Dom" and Jakob working in the pit crew. Dom argues with rival racer Kenny Linder about his dirty tactics. During the race, Linder's car clips Jack's bumper, causing his car to crash and catch fire, killing him. A week after, Dom is arrested for beating Linder to near-death. While serving his sentence, Dom recalls that Jakob had worked on Jack's stock car engine the day he died and concludes that Jakob killed Jack. Upon release, Dom confronts and challenges Jakob to a race, pitting his 1967 Dodge Charger against Jakob's 1992 Ford Mustang Foxbody. Jakob loses and Dom forces him to leave Los Angeles.

In the present day, Dom is retired and raising his son Brian (Note: As depicted in The Fate of the Furious (2017)) with his wife Letty Ortiz. Roman Pearce, Tej Parker and Ramsey arrive with news that shortly after arresting Cipher, Mr. Nobody's plane was attacked by rogue agents, who abducted Cipher and crashed in Montequinto, a fictional Central American country. Dom agrees to help them after realizing Jakob is involved. Searching the plane, they find part of a device called Project Aries, which can hack into any computer weapons system. The team is ambushed by a private army led by Jakob, who steals the device. Michael Stasiak helps Dom's crew escape to their safe house at the Caspian Sea and Dom's sister Mia arrives to help. The team learns that Han Lue is connected to Project Aries, at which point, Letty and Mia leave for Tokyo to investigate.

Meanwhile, Jakob meets with Otto, his associate and financier. Cipher, who is being held at their base, tells Jakob that the other half of Aries is in Edinburgh. Dom meets his father's mechanic Buddy, who took Jakob after his exile, and learns that Jakob is in London. In Tokyo, Letty and Mia find Han alive, along with his ward Elle. Roman and Tej travel to Germany to recruit Sean Boswell, Twinkie and Earl Hu, who have been working on a "rocket car". In London, Dom meets Queenie Shaw, who gives him Jakob's location. Dom confronts Otto and Jakob at a party held at Otto's mansion; Otto has Dom arrested, but Leysa, Dom's old friend, rescues him. Tej, Roman and Ramsey join Dom in Edinburgh, where Jakob uses an electromagnet to steal the other half of the Project Aries. Tej and Roman find the truck containing the electromagnet; as they fight Otto's men, Ramsey commandeers the truck to chase after Otto.

Dom intercepts Jakob and the two fight throughout the city. Before Otto can extract Jakob, Ramsey runs his car off the road and uses the electromagnet to capture Jakob. At the safe house, Han reveals that Mr. Nobody assigned him to protect Elle and Project Aries as Elle's DNA is its biometric activation key. When Jakob went rogue and teamed up with Otto, they used Deckard Shaw to fake Han's death (Note: As depicted in The Fast and the Furious: Tokyo Drift (2006), Fast & Furious 6 (2013), and Furious 7 (2015)) and protect Elle. Otto and his men attack the safehouse and free Jakob, who reveals to Dom that Jack, wanting to escape deep debt, had instructed Jakob to tamper with his car to throw the race. Jakob and Otto kidnap Elle and take the other half of the Project Aries. Otto launches a satellite into orbit, while Jakob has Elle activate Aries. They begin uploading Aries to the satellite, moving in an armored truck throughout Tbilisi.

Dom, Letty, Mia, Ramsey and Han race to stop the upload. As Mia and Han try to breach the truck, Otto reveals that he and Cipher have teamed up and throws Jakob off the truck. Jakob is rescued by Dom and Mia, where he helps them access the truck. Tej and Roman enter orbit and destroy the satellite using the rocket car, stopping the upload. Cipher bombs the truck using a UAV in an attempt to kill Dom, but unintentionally kills Otto. Dom uses the ricocheting truck to destroy Cipher's drone, which is revealed to be simulated, and Cipher escapes. Dom and Mia reconcile with Jakob and Dom allows him to escape custody by giving him the keys to his car, finally forgiving Jakob. Tej and Roman reach the International Space Station and return safely to Earth. The team celebrates their success with a barbecue at Dom's house. While preparing to say grace, Brian O'Conner's car arrives in the driveway.

In a mid-credits scene, Deckard comes face-to-face with Han while interrogating someone and is shocked to see him alive.

== Cast ==
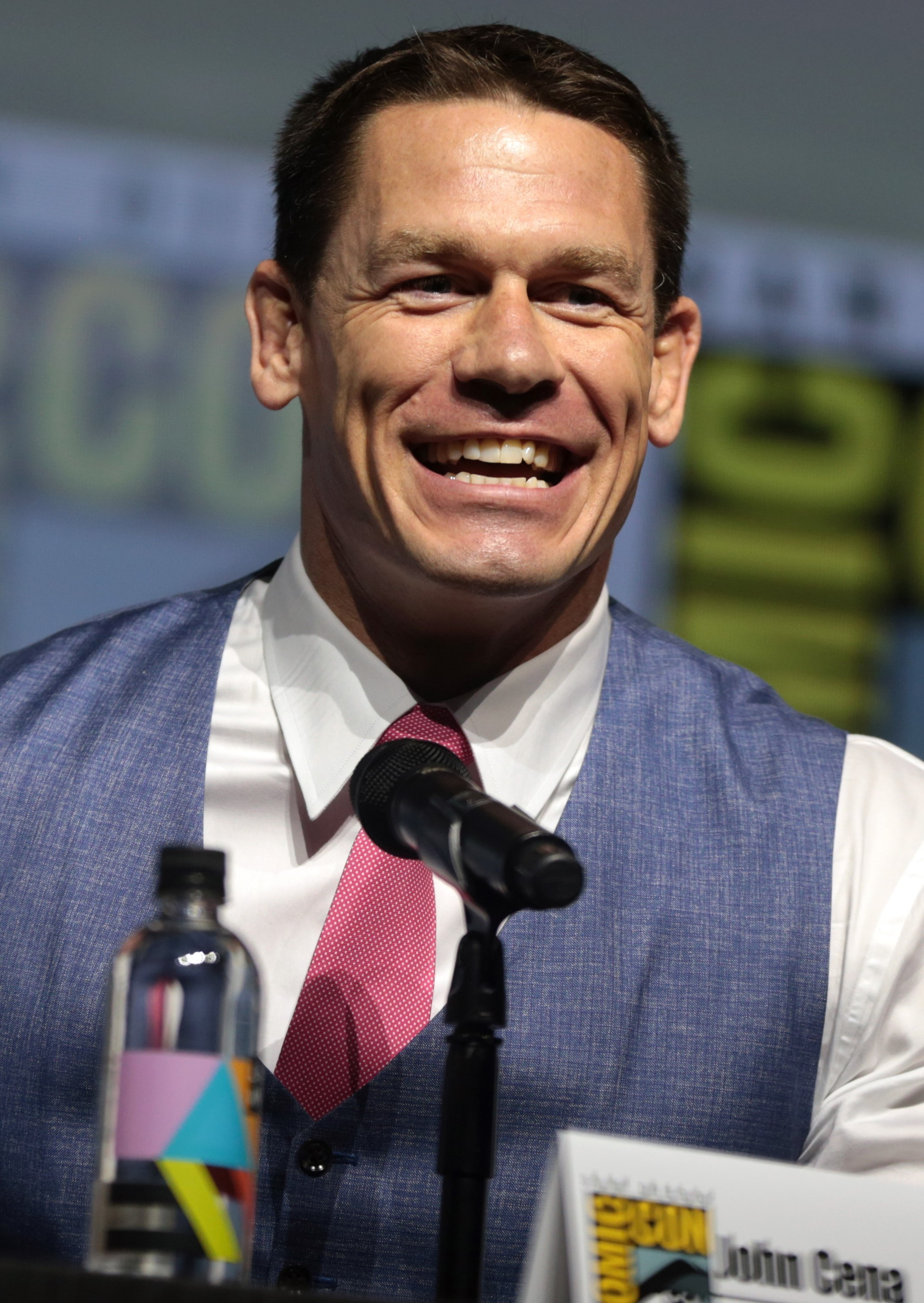
John Cena joined the franchise as Jakob Toretto.

- Vin Diesel as Dominic Toretto: A former criminal and professional street racer who has retired and settled down with his wife, Letty, and his son, Brian Marcos. Diesel's son Vincent Sinclair portrays a young Dominic, while Vinnie Bennett portrays a teenage Dominic.
- Michelle Rodriguez as Letty Ortiz: Dom's wife and a former criminal and professional street racer. Azia Dinea Hale portrays a young Letty.
- Tyrese Gibson as Roman Pearce: An ex-habitual offender, expert street racer and a member of Dom's team.
- Ludacris (credited as Chris “Ludacris” Bridges) as Tej Parker: A mechanic from Miami and a member of Dom's team.
- John Cena as Jakob Toretto: The estranged brother of Dom and Mia who is working as a master thief, assassin, and high-performance driver; also Mr. Nobody's rogue agent. Finn Cole portrays a young Jakob.
- Nathalie Emmanuel as Ramsey: A British computer hacktivist and a member of Dom's team.
- Jordana Brewster as Mia Toretto: The sister of Dom and Jakob and a member of the former's team who has settled down with her partner, Brian O'Conner, and their two children. Siena Agudong portrays a young Mia.
- Sung Kang as Han Lue: A member of Dom's team who was believed to have been killed.
- Michael Rooker as Buddy: An auto mechanic who has ties to Dom's past as a member of his father's pit crew.
- Helen Mirren as Magdalene "Queenie" Ellmanson-Shaw: The mother of Dom's former enemies Deckard and Owen.
- Kurt Russell as Mr. Nobody: An intelligence operative and the leader of a covert ops team.
- Charlize Theron as Cipher: A criminal mastermind and cyberterrorist who is an enemy of Dom's team.
- Thue Ersted Rasmussen as Otto: A son of an aristocrat who is the financier for Jakob.

Additionally, J. D. Pardo portrays Jack Toretto, Jim Parrack portrays Kenny Linder, Martyn Ford portrays Sue, and Cardi B portrays Leysa, a woman who shares history with Dom and Magdalene. Karson Kern and Igby Rigney portray young versions of Vince and Jesse, respectively.

Lucas Black, Don Omar, and Shea Whigham reprise their respective roles as Sean Boswell, Santos, and Agent Michael Stasiak from previous films, while Shad Moss and Jason Tobin also reprise their respective roles as Twinkie and Earl from The Fast and the Furious: Tokyo Drift (2006). Cered and Ozuna portray young versions of Leo and Santos, respectively. Jason Statham reprises his role as Deckard Shaw in an uncredited cameo appearance during the end credits, and Puerto Rican rapper Bad Bunny appears as Lookout. Gal Gadot appears as Gisele Yashar through archival footage.

== Production ==
=== Development ===
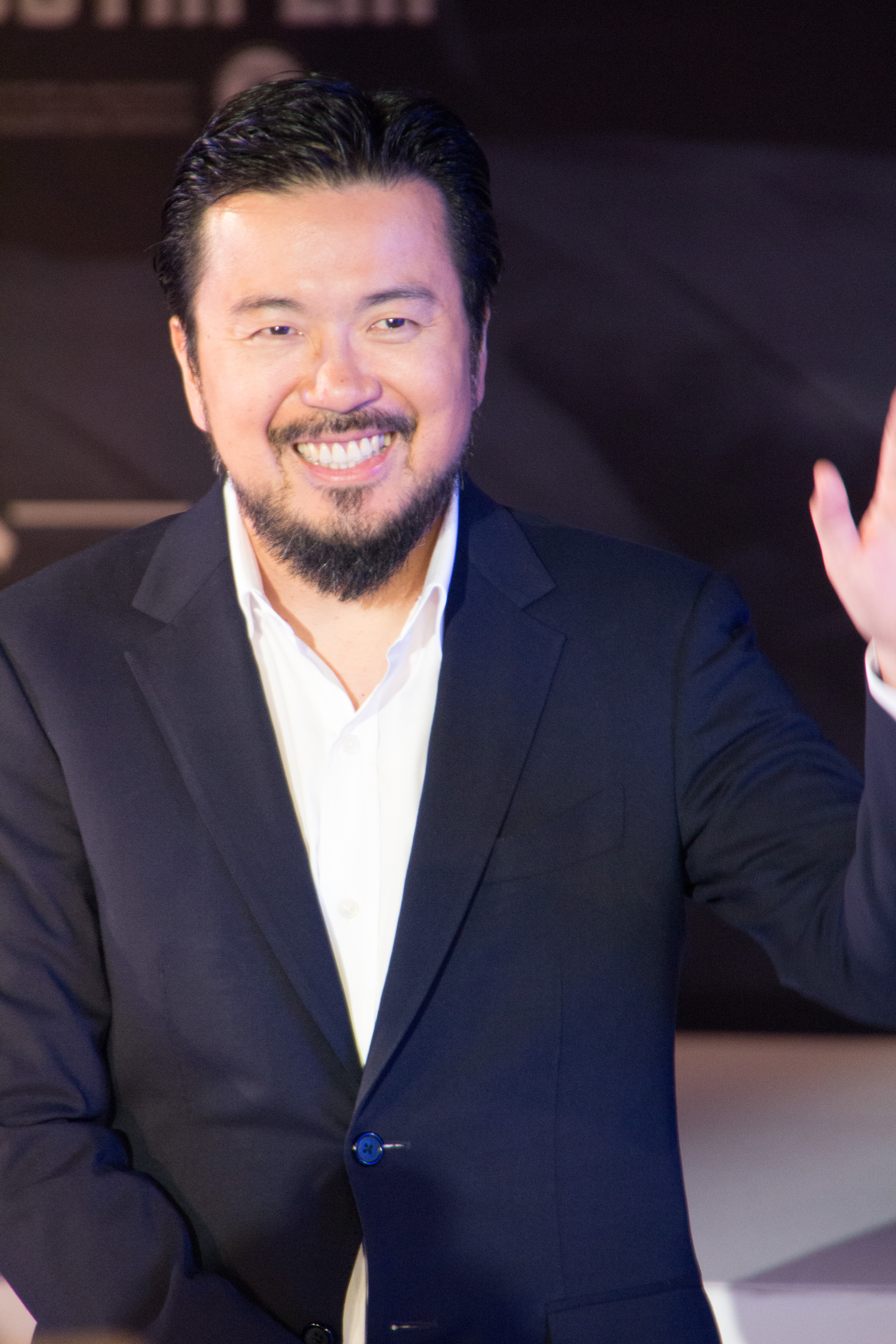
Justin Lin returned to the franchise to direct F9.

In November 2014, Universal Pictures chairwoman Donna Langley confirmed that a discussion regarding three sequels to Furious 7 (2015) had taken place. Actor Vin Diesel reaffirmed this in September 2015, alluding the trilogy could lead to the mainline series' conclusion. Furious 7 (2015) film director James Wan was originally contractually hired to direct The Fate of the Furious (2017) and this film, but the studio let him go after he told them about his wishes to make The Conjuring 2 (2016), a sequel to his previous horror film The Conjuring (2013), and firmly declined directing both the eighth film and this film due to the seventh film's demanding production impacting on his health. In October 2017, Diesel revealed in a Facebook live video that Justin Lin, who directed every film from The Fast and the Furious: Tokyo Drift (2006) through Fast & Furious 6 (2013), would be returning to direct this film and Fast X (2023). In May 2018, Daniel Casey was hired to write the screenplay after Chris Morgan left due to his work on Hobbs & Shaw (2019). Neal H. Moritz returned as producer after being left out of Hobbs & Shaw (2019) due to issues with Universal Pictures.

=== Casting ===
In April 2017, Vin Diesel and Dwayne Johnson stated that they would return. In October 2017, Jordana Brewster, who portrayed Mia Toretto in five of the franchise's films, was set to reprise her role for the ninth and tenth entries. On April 4, 2018, Johnson stated that he was now unsure if would return for this film due to working on Hobbs & Shaw (2019), and he confirmed in January 2019 that neither he nor Jason Statham would be returning and reprising their roles as Luke Hobbs and Deckard Shaw respectively for this film due to production of Hobbs & Shaw (2019). Ultimately Statham only made a cameo appearance during the mid-credits scene.

In June 2019, John Cena was officially cast in the film, after an initial announcement from Diesel in April. In July 2019, Finn Cole, Anna Sawai, and Vinnie Bennett joined the cast of the film. That same month, it was announced Helen Mirren and Charlize Theron would reprise their roles, with Michelle Rodriguez also confirmed to return. Michael Rooker and MMA Fighter Francis Ngannou were added to the cast in August. In October 2019, Ozuna and Cardi B joined the cast of the film.

=== Filming ===
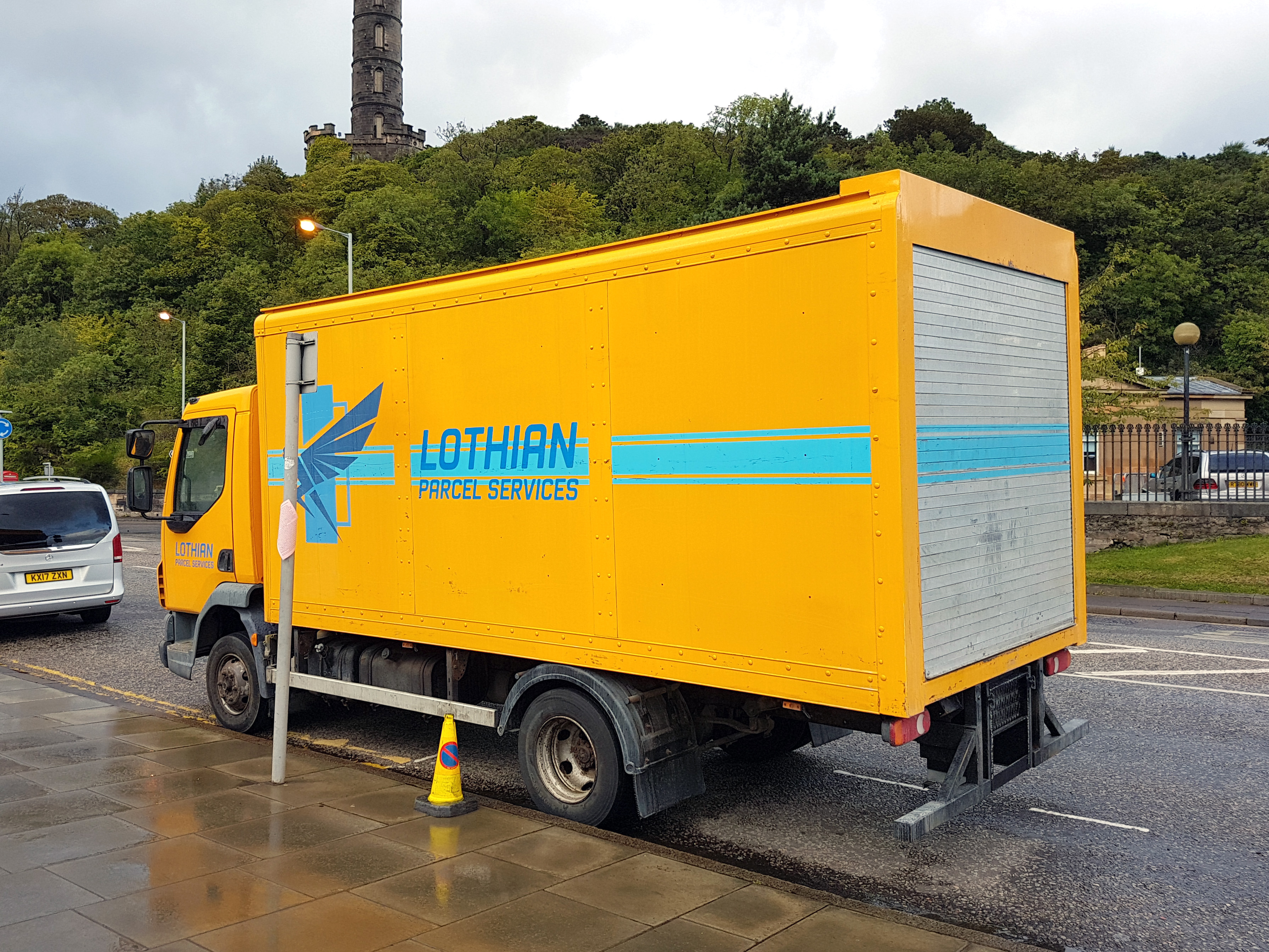
A 'Lothian Parcel Services' truck created for the film, parked up near filming in Edinburgh.

Principal photography began on June 24, 2019, at Leavesden Studios in Hertfordshire, England. Filming took place in Los Angeles, Edinburgh, and London, and also took place in Thailand for the first time, with Krabi, Ko Pha-ngan, and Phuket used as locations. Part of the film was also shot in Tbilisi, Georgia. Filming wrapped on November 11, 2019.

In July 2019, stuntman Joe Watts, who doubled for Diesel, sustained a serious head injury during filming at Leavesden Studios. In September 2020, Michelle Rodriguez confirmed the film would be set in outer space as well, which was teased by Diesel.

=== Post-production ===
Dylan Highsmith, Kelly Matsumoto and Greg D'Auria served as the film's editors, with additional editing provided by David Kern. Peter Chiang, who worked with Lin on Star Trek Beyond (2016), served as the overall visual effects supervisor with DNEG, Industrial Light & Magic, Lola VFX, Stereo D and Factory VFX as the vendors. DNEG also converted the film to 3D.

=== Music ===
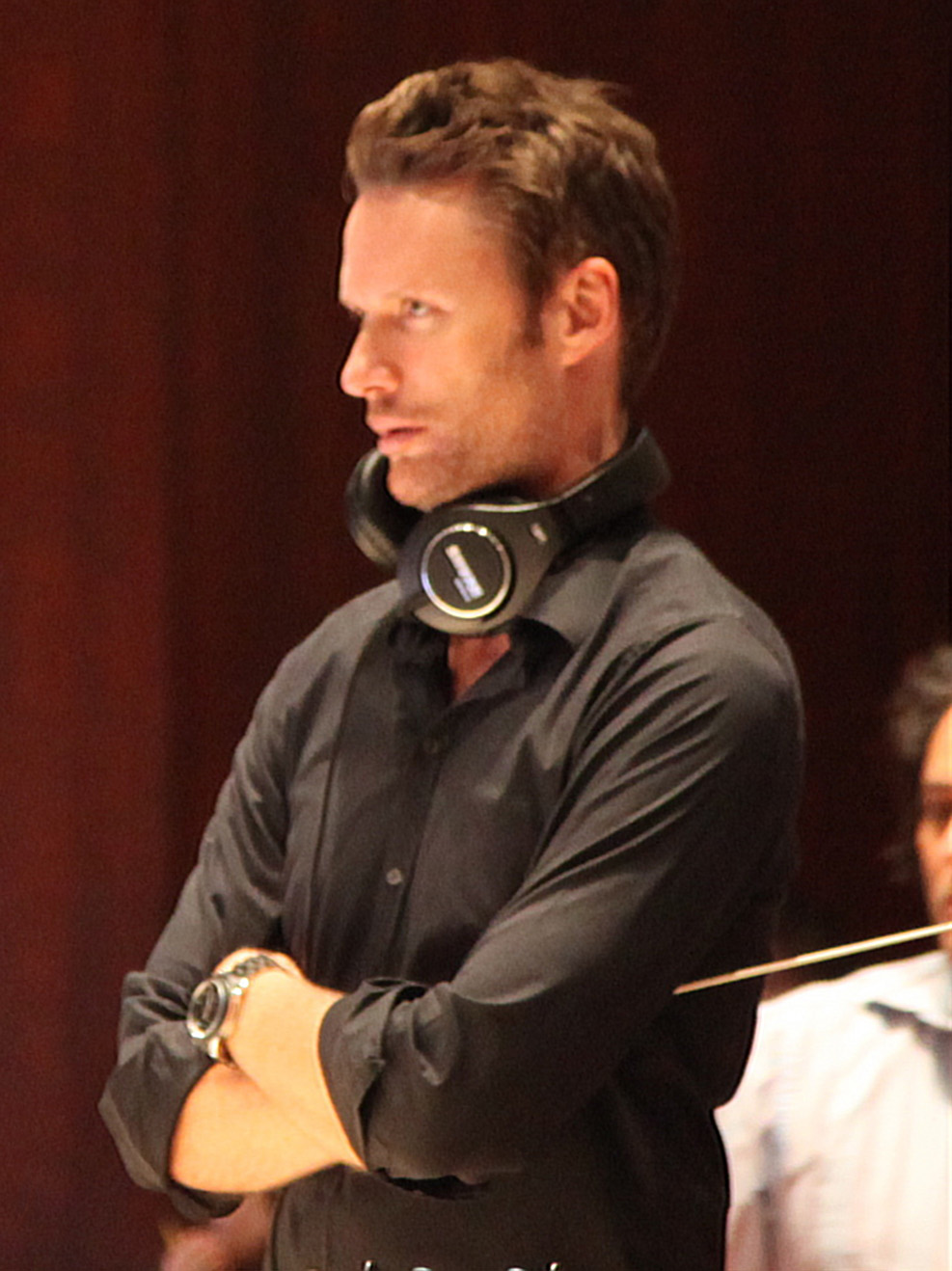
Brian Tyler returned to compose the score.

On July 31, 2020, a mixtape titled Road to F9 was released, and features music inspired by the film. The mixtape was preceded by the lead single "One Shot" by YoungBoy Never Broke Again and Lil Baby.

Trailers for the film included the songs "Family" by The Chainsmokers and Kygo, "Is You Ready" by Migos and "Selah" by Kanye West.

The official soundtrack was released on June 17, 2021. The score album, composed by Brian Tyler was released on July 2, 2021.

== Release ==
=== Theatrical ===
F9 had its world premiere in South Korea on May 19, 2021, the United Kingdom on June 24 and was released in the United States on June 25. The film had five previous planned release dates in the United States between 2019 and 2021. These shifts were reportedly made due to the releases of Hobbs & Shaw and the James Bond film No Time to Die (2021), as well as the COVID-19 pandemic.

=== Home media ===
F9 was released on Blu-ray, Ultra HD Blu-ray, and DVD on September 21, 2021, by Universal Pictures Home Entertainment. These media featured the theatrical version and a director's cut version, with the latter being 7 minutes longer. The film is also offered as a ultra-high-definition steelbook featuring the poster alongside both versions of the film. It was released as a rental on VOD services in the United States on July 30, 2021. F9 was also released on Blu-Ray and DVD on October 11, 2021. In January 2022, tech firm Akami reported that F9 was the fourth most pirated film of 2021. F9 was released on HBO Max on March 4, 2022.

== Reception ==
=== Box office ===
F9 grossed $173 million in the United States and Canada, and $553.2 million in other territories, for a worldwide total of $726.2 million. It was the fifth-highest-grossing film of 2021.

In the United States and Canada, F9 was projected to gross $55–65 million from 4,179 theaters in its opening weekend. The film made $30 million on its first day (including $7.1 million from Thursday night previews), both the best such totals of the pandemic period. It went on to debut to $70 million, the highest-grossing weekend since Star Wars: The Rise of Skywalker ($72.4 million) in December 2019. Like previous Fast & Furious films, the audience was diverse (with 37% Hispanic, 35% Caucasian, 16% Black and 8% Asian) and skewed to both younger (51% under the age of 25) and male (57%) crowds. In its second weekend, the film fell 65% to $23 million, remaining atop the box office. With Universal's F9, The Boss Baby: Family Business, and The Forever Purge finishing in the top three spots, it marked the first time a single studio accomplished the feat since February 2005. It also crossed $100 million domestically and $500 million internationally in record time for the COVID-19 pandemic era. The film made $11.4 million but was dethroned by newcomer Black Widow the following weekend, then made $7.6 million in its fourth frame, finishing in fourth.

Over its five-day international opening weekend, beginning May 19, F9 was projected to gross $160–180 million from eight countries, including China, Russia, and South Korea. It went on to debut to $163 million, the biggest international opening for a Hollywood film since the pandemic began in March 2020. It also set the pandemic-record for IMAX gross ($14 million), and was the second-biggest May international opening ever, despite playing in 26 fewer countries than the current record holder, Captain America: Civil War. The top markets from the weekend were China ($136 million; the second biggest-ever opening of the franchise in the country), South Korea ($9.9 million), Russia ($8.3 million), Saudi Arabia ($2.67 million), and the UAE ($2.64 million). In its second weekend of international release the film made $30.8 million, including $20.3 million (-85%) in China and $3.7 million (-42%) in South Korea.

=== Critical response ===
On the review aggregator website Rotten Tomatoes, 60% of 315 critics gave F9 a positive review, with an average rating of 5.7/10. The site's critics consensus reads, "F9 sends the franchise hurtling further over the top than ever, but director Justin Lin's knack for preposterous set pieces keeps the action humming." According to Metacritic, which assigned a weighted average of 58 out of 100 based on 54 critics, the film received "mixed or average" reviews. Audiences polled by CinemaScore gave the film an average grade of "B+" on an A+ to F scale (becoming the first Fast & Furious film to receive such a rating since the original 2001 film), while PostTrak reported 80% of audience members gave it a positive score, with 62% saying they would definitely recommend it.

From TheWrap, Alonso Duralde summarized the film by writing that "Physics, gravity, and logic in general have long since been thrown out the window, but the jolts of pleasure keep coming." Matt Patches of Polygon criticized the film for its lack of characterization, saying, "After 20 years of Fast films, Dom is a totally functional blockbuster superhero," and that "F9 counteracts any character development by devoting a grating amount of time to meta-commentary on its own ridiculousness." However, he also praised Lin's direction and the set pieces by writing, "Each location fills Lin's pockets with the currency of imagination, which he cashes in with absolute delight. Where previous installments built off the glory of The Italian Job, The French Connection, and Mad Max: Fury Road, F9 finds inspiration in the Harlem Globetrotters. The cars catch falling bystanders, flip over enemy off-roaders, and stage intricately choreographed attacks using amped-up magnets."

Variety's Owen Gleiberman found one of the opening scenes to be "the suspenseful high point of the movie," and wrote, "The scene is so over-the-top ludicrous that it's [as] if the filmmakers were saying, 'Let's put what would have been the grand climax of Fast and Furious 4 in the opening half hour.' Good enough. But what do you do for an encore?" Writing for The Hollywood Reporter, John DeFore said that the feature "probably sounds like more fun than it is," and concluded his generally negative review by saying that "Furious 7 was a lot more fun. And, not that anyone cares, but it was more believable as well." Meanwhile, IndieWire's David Ehrlich gave a more negative response with a C+ rating, and praised Lin's direction, writing, "This is a movie that sling-shots so far past self-parody that it loops all the way back to something real." Jesse Hassenger of The A. V. Club also gave the film a C+ rating, remarking that "Lin's writing just isn't as fleet as his directing—and his directing in F9 isn't as fleet as his work on Fast Five or Fast & Furious 6." He added, "The problem is all the runway in between the highlights, even longer than the endless literal concrete of the Fast & Furious 6 climax. After a reinvention as a warmer, more diverse Mission: Impossible (practically name-checked here), the series has wound up more like a mid-period James Bond movie in its channel-surfing bloat."

=== Accolades ===
Accolades received by F9 (film)
Award	Date of ceremony	Category	Recipient(s)	Result	Ref.
Golden Trailer Awards	July 22, 2021	Best Action	"Path" (AV Squad)	Nominated	
Golden Trailer Awards	July 22, 2021	Best Summer Blockbuster Trailer	"Path" (AV Squad)	Won	
Golden Trailer Awards	July 22, 2021	Best Summer Blockbuster TV Spot (for a Feature Film)	"Risk Super Bowl :30" (AV Squad)	Nominated	
Golden Trailer Awards	October 6, 2022	The Don LaFontaine Award for Best Voice Over	"Dom's Story" (Ignition)	Nominated	
Golden Trailer Awards	October 6, 2022	Best Summer Blockbuster TV Spot (for a Feature Film)	"Risk Super Bowl :30" (AV Squad)	Nominated	
ICG Publicists Awards	March 25, 2022	Maxwell Weinberg Publicists Showmanship Motion Picture Award	F9	Nominated	
Nickelodeon Kids' Choice Awards	April 9, 2022	Favorite Movie Actor	Vin Diesel	Nominated	
Nickelodeon Kids' Choice Awards	April 9, 2022	Favorite Movie Actor	John Cena	Nominated	
People's Choice Awards	December 7, 2021	Movie of 2021	F9	Nominated	
People's Choice Awards	December 7, 2021	Action Movie of 2021	F9	Nominated	
People's Choice Awards	December 7, 2021	Male Movie Star of 2021	Vin Diesel	Nominated	
People's Choice Awards	December 7, 2021	Male Movie Star of 2021	John Cena	Nominated	
People's Choice Awards	December 7, 2021	Female Movie Star of 2021	Charlize Theron	Nominated	
People's Choice Awards	December 7, 2021	Action Movie Star of 2021	Vin Diesel	Nominated	
People's Choice Awards	December 7, 2021	Action Movie Star of 2021	John Cena	Nominated	
People's Choice Awards	December 7, 2021	Action Movie Star of 2021	Charlize Theron	Nominated	
Saturn Awards	October 25, 2022	Best Action or Adventure Film	F9	Nominated	

== Sequel ==
Fast X was released on May 19, 2023. Although Fast X was reported as the final mainline installment of the franchise, an eleventh film, Fast Forever (2028), is in production.
