= Los Bandoleros (film) =

- Promotional poster
- Directed by: Vin Diesel
- Written by: Vin Diesel
- Produced by: Vin Diesel; Jessy Terrero; Samantha Vincent
- Starring: Vin Diesel; Michelle Rodriguez; Sung Kang; Tego Calderón; Don Omar
- Cinematography: Shawn Kim
- Edited by: Justin Bourret; Sonia Gonzalez
- Production companies: One Race Films; Terrero Films
- Distributed by: Universal Pictures
- Release date: July 28, 2009
- Running time: 20 minutes
- Country: United States
- Languages: English; Spanish

Los Bandoleros (transl. The Outlaws) is a 2009 American direct-to-video short film written and directed by Vin Diesel. It is the second short film in the Fast & Furious franchise and serves as the prequel to Fast & Furious (2009). It stars Diesel, Michelle Rodriguez, Sung Kang, Tego Calderón, and Don Omar. In the film, runaway fugitive Dominic Toretto (Diesel) sets up the hijacking of a fuel tanker in the Dominican Republic.

Development for this short film began following the announcement of Fast & Furious (2009), and serves as a narrative bridge and a sequel following the events of The Fast and the Furious (2001), The Turbo Charged Prelude for 2 Fast 2 Furious (2003) and 2 Fast 2 Furious (2003). The film was released in the United States on July 28, 2009, as part of the Blu-ray and Special Edition home releases of Fast & Furious (2009).

== Plot ==
Five years after escaping Los Angeles from authorities (Note: As depicted at the end of The Fast and the Furious (2001)), Dominic Toretto recruits Han Lue and Rico Santos to help Tego Leo, Dom's associate, escape from a prison in the Dominican Republic. Dom, having lived as a fugitive in the country for the last few years, and his crew organize a meet with local politician Elvis to set up the hijacking of a fuel tanker; Elvis seeks to exploit the fallout for a political advantage, while Dom and his crew wish to give away the fuel to Rico's aunt, Rabia, and their local community.

Cara and Malo, two of Dom's friends, accompany the rest of the crew to a nightclub to meet Elvis, who arranges the robbery to take place on a highway the following morning. Dom is then surprised by the arrival of Letty Ortiz; they drive together to a beach and rekindle their romance.

== Cast ==
- Vin Diesel as Dominic Toretto, a runaway fugitive hiding in the Dominican Republic who plots to steal oil.
- Michelle Rodriguez as Letty Ortiz, Dom's wife and an associate in the heist.
- Sung Kang as Han Lue, a criminal associate of Dom who aids him in the oil heist.
- Tego Calderón as Tego Leo, an escaped inmate who works with Dom to steal the oil.
- Don Omar as Rico Santos, a member of Dom's crew who protects him from law enforcement.

The central cast is rounded out by appearances from Juan Fernandez as Elvis, a local politician who helps organize the hijacking. Mirtha Michelle and F. Valentino Morales feature as Cara and Malo respectively, friends of both Dom and Rico. Adria Carrasco also appears as Rubia, Rico's aunt.

== Background ==
Los Bandoleros is said to "hold together the entire Fast & Furious timeline" and to ensure a certain continuity in the franchise.
