= Veilside =

Aftermarket automotive company

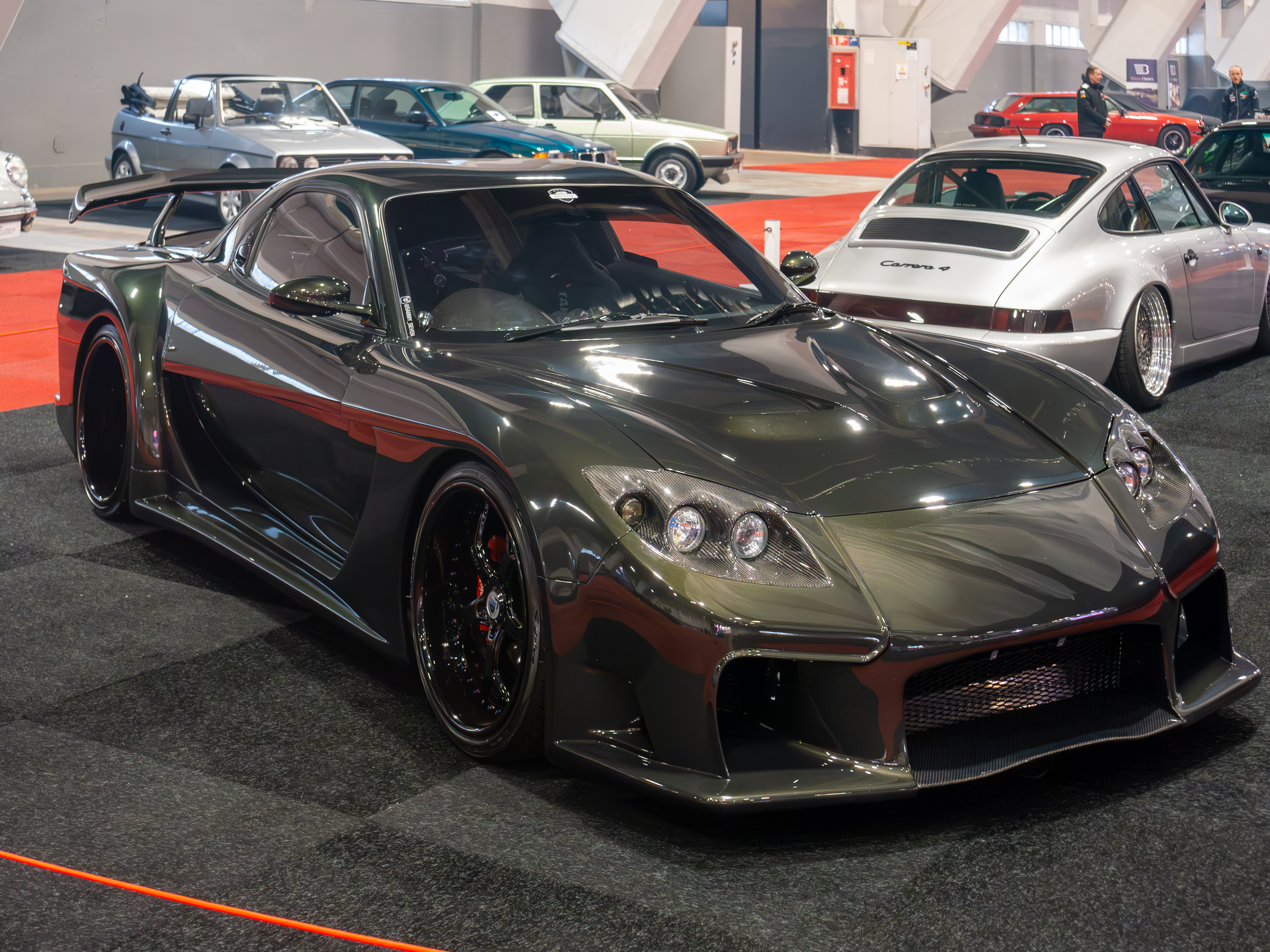
- Mazda RX-7 with a Veilside Fortune body kit
- Type: Privately held company
- Industry: Automotive
- Founded: 1990 in Shimotsuma
- Founder: Yokomaku Hiranao
- Headquarters: Shimotsuma
- Products: Body kits
- Website: www.veilsidejpn.com

Veilside Co., Ltd. (ヴェイルサイド株式会社, Vueirusaido kabushiki gaisha; officially stylized as VeilSide) is a Japanese aftermarket automotive company which initially sold suspension and engine tuning parts, and now sells interior as well as body parts for aerodynamic and aesthetic enhancement of the vehicle.

The name is derived from the owner's name, Hironao Yokomaku. "Yoko" means "side" and "maku" means "veil", which were then conjoined to form the company's name "VeilSide".

== History ==
Based in Japan near the Tsukuba Circuit race course, the company first started its business in 1990. It initially focused on performance tuning, and at the 1991 Tokyo Auto Salon, VeilSide took the Grand Prize in the Tuned Car category. Hironao was influenced by the 1960s Batmobile and made his designs along those lines. In 1994, the Supra Combat design was released, which earned the Grand prize at the Tokyo Auto Salon in the Complete Car category.

Toyota Supra with a Veilside body kit

Honda NSX with a Veilside Fortune body kit

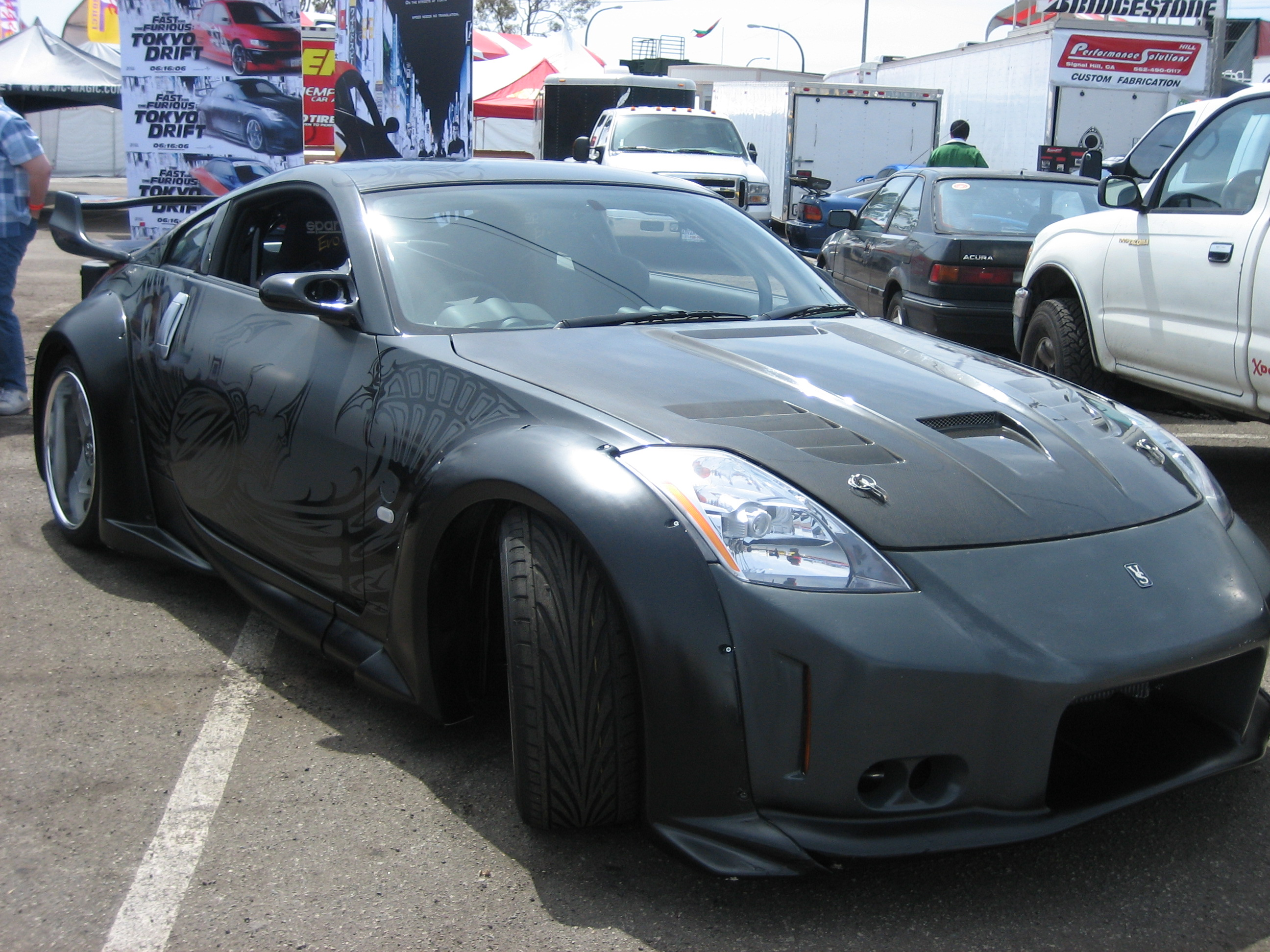
Nissan 350Z with a Veilside body kit

In July 1995, VeilSide received the Ministry of Transportation's authorization for the production, distribution, and selling of a range of aero parts. Following this acceptance, VeilSide began to produce a full range of products. Their aerodynamic parts catalogue was originally intended for Japanese models, such as the Toyota Supra, Mazda RX-7, Subaru Impreza, and Mitsubishi FTO, although they have since extended their portfolio to include American and European models. VeilSide produces a bodykit called "Fortune" which replaces all body panels except the roof. It is currently available for the Mazda RX-7 FD3S, Toyota Supra Mark IV, Acura NSX, Toyota MR-S, and the Nissan Skyline V35/V36. The Fortune kit ranges from US$4,500 for the MRS to US$15,000 for the RX-7. The Fortune kit also turns Nissan Skylines into Infiniti G models. VeilSide manufactures aerodynamic wing mirrors and GT-style wing spoilers and also its own line of clothing.

The company made its own wheels available under the brand name of VeilSide Andrew Racing Wheels. Many of their factory cars from the late nineties featured these wheels. As of January, 2006 VeilSide's website lists all three designs—Andrew Evolution V (18 inch and 19 inch), Andrew Golt Dish (18 inch), and Andrew Dish (18 inch)—as discontinued.

In addition to its body kits, the company also provides an engine tuning service and sometimes uses their cars to compete in time attack, drag racing and drifting events such as D1 Grand Prix.

== Notable uses ==
Their products have been featured in movies such as The Fast and the Furious (2001), 2 Fast 2 Furious (2003), The Fast and the Furious: Tokyo Drift (2006), Fast & Furious (2009), Fast Five (2011) and Fast & Furious 6 (2013).
