= Better Luck Tomorrow =

2002 film by Justin Lin

- Theatrical release poster
- Directed by: Justin Lin
- Written by: Ernesto Foronda; Justin Lin; Fabian Marquez
- Produced by: Justin Lin; Julie Asato; Ernesto Foronda
- Starring: Parry Shen; Jason Tobin; Sung Kang; Roger Fan; John Cho; Karin Anna Cheung
- Cinematography: Patrice Lucien Cochet
- Edited by: Justin Lin
- Music by: Michael Gonzales; Tobin Mori
- Production companies: Hudson River Entertainment; Cherry Sky Films; Day O Productions; Trailing Johnson Productions
- Distributed by: Paramount Pictures; MTV Films
- Release dates: January 12, 2002 (Sundance); April 11, 2003 (US)
- Running time: 95 minutes
- Country: United States
- Language: English
- Budget: $250,000
- Box office: $3.8 million

Better Luck Tomorrow is a 2002 American crime drama film directed, co-written, co-produced, and edited by Justin Lin. It follows a group of overachieving Asian American teenagers who become bored with their lives and enter a world of petty crime and material excess. The plot is loosely based on the 1992 murder of Stuart Tay. The film stars Parry Shen, Jason Tobin, Sung Kang, Roger Fan, Karin Anna Cheung and John Cho.

Better Luck Tomorrow debuted at the 2002 Sundance Film Festival. It became the first film acquired by MTV Films, which worked with Paramount Pictures to release the film theatrically in the United States on April 11, 2003. It received generally positive reviews from critics, and developed a grassroots following among Asian American audiences.

The film is notable for originating the character Han Lue (Sung Kang), later featured prominently in the Fast & Furious film series.

== Plot ==
High school junior Ben Manibag is an overachieving Asian American teenager living in an affluent suburb of Orange County, California. For the 2001–02 academic year, he sets goals to make his school's basketball team, date his cheerleader crush, Stephanie Vandergosh, and earn the grades necessary for admission to a prestigious Ivy League university. However, his perfectionism masks another side of his life: toilet-papering houses and engaging in petty crime alongside his rowdy best friend, Virgil Hu, and Virgil's carefree older cousin, Han Lue.

Ben makes the basketball team, but is relegated to the bench. Daric Loo, the senior valedictorian and leader of the school's Academic Decathlon team, recruits Ben to participate in a schoolwide cheating operation. Daric pays another student, Jesus, to steal tests from the school office, which Ben uses to create cheat sheets sold to other students. Virgil and Han are brought into the scheme, earning the group a small fortune. Meanwhile, Ben finds himself competing with Steve Choe, a private school student and Stephanie's boyfriend, for her affection. After discovering Ben's crush, Steve offers to let him take Stephanie to the Winter Formal.

Ben, Virgil, Daric, and Han regularly spend time together, gradually escalating their money-making activities into more serious crimes, such as stealing school computer parts and selling drugs. After joining the Academic Decathlon team, whose members party and engage in substance use during practices, Ben develops a cocaine addiction. Feeling increasingly conflicted by others' expectations and disturbed after waking up with a cocaine-induced nosebleed, Ben withdraws socially. He resumes his former pursuits and spends more time with Stephanie, including at the Winter Formal dance, but remains frustrated by Steve's continued presence in her life.

At the Academic Decathlon national competition in Las Vegas, Ben decides to set aside his worries about Stephanie and reunite with his friends. The group spends their time drinking heavily, gambling in casinos, and having sex with a call girl. Upon returning from Las Vegas, they are contacted by Steve about a possible score, but are stunned to learn that he wants them to rob his own parents' unsupervised oceanside villa. Although Ben and Han are initially opposed to the idea, Daric convinces them that it would be the perfect opportunity to teach the indifferent Steve a lesson.

On New Year's Eve, the four meet Steve at Jesus's home garage under the pretense of planning the robbery, but Daric, Virgil and Han suddenly attack him. During the ensuing struggle, Steve grabs Virgil's gun, which accidentally discharges. Ben rushes in, sees the gun in Steve's hand, and seemingly beats him to death with a baseball bat. The group convinces Jesus to bury the body in his backyard in exchange for $300. When a severely injured Steve begins to twitch, Daric suffocates him to death with a gasoline-soaked rag. Afterwards, the four attend a New Year's Eve party, where Ben and Stephanie kiss at midnight.

The next day, while cleaning up the aftermath of the murder, Ben and Virgil hear Steve's phone ringing beneath the ground in Jesus's backyard. After digging it up, they discover that the call was from Stephanie. Ben debates whether to report Steve's murder to the police. Overwhelmed by guilt, Virgil attempts suicide but survives with possible brain damage. At the hospital, Daric expresses concern that Han or Virgil might report the murder, but Ben calmly resolves to do nothing and walks away.

A few days later, Ben encounters Stephanie while walking home. She asks whether he has seen Steve lately, and expresses concern that he has not contacted her. The two kiss. In a voice-over narration, Ben admits that he does not know what the future holds, but knows that there is no turning back.

== Cast ==
- Parry Shen as Ben Manibag
- Jason Tobin as Virgil Hu
- Sung Kang as Han Lue
- Roger Fan as Daric Loo
- John Cho as Steve Choe
- Karin Anna Cheung as Stephanie Vandergosh
- Aaron Takahashi as Takeshi
- Darian Weiss as Kenny Vandergosh
- Alden Ray as Ulden
- Ryan Cadiz as Jesus Navarro
- Jessie S. Marion as Gina Nabham
- A.J. Green as Mr. Farmer
- Beverly Sotelo as Audrey
- Jerry Mathers as the biology teacher

== Production ==
=== Development ===
Justin Lin said that the title Better Luck Tomorrow refers to how the film explores "the whole youth culture of today, specifically Asian-American, but also just the general mentality of teenagers today. I mean, I work with teenagers, I grew up in the 80s, and already it's very different, the mentality. You go to suburbia, you look at upper-middle-class-kids, and through the media they've literally adopted an urban-gangsta-mentality."

The plot is inspired by the 1992 murder of Stuart Tay. Tay, a 17-year-old Chinese American high school student in Orange County, California, was killed by several peers following a failed petty crime scheme. Tay and the perpetrators were all high-achieving students who intended to attend elite universities and college, which led the media to dub the crime "the Honor Roll Murder." While Lin had followed media coverage of the Tay murder, he consciously chose not to base the film too closely on the real event.

While writing the script, he found inspiration in his work as a youth basketball coach and teaching high school students how to make community documentaries.

=== Pre-production and casting ===
Lin's original investors wanted a white cast with Macaulay Culkin as the male lead if he wanted a million dollar investment for his movie. Lin objected and continued to fund the project with his 10 credit cards and life savings. He said knowing the film "potentially could've been the last film I ever made" he wanted to make it "about issues that were very important to me."

After those funds were depleted, finishing funds equivalent to one third of the film's budget were provided by Cherry Sky Films for post-production, preparing the film to submit to Sundance, after producer Joan Huang reconnected with Lin at the LA Asian Pacific American Film Festival.

A crucial $10,000 was provided by MC Hammer, whom Lin had met in April 2001, when he was working at the Japanese American National Museum and attended the National Association of Broadcasters convention in Las Vegas, Nevada. "Out of desperation, I called up MC Hammer because he had read the script and liked it. Two hours later, he wired the money we needed into a bank account and saved us," Lin said. MC Hammer is credited as a producer of the film.

Sung Kang had originally wanted to play Ben Manibag.

=== Filming ===
Originally the film was going to be shot using digital video, but within two weeks, after Fujifilm and later Kodak proposed deals with the director, the filming switched to 35 mm.

== Reception ==
=== Critical reception ===
The film has an approval rating of 81% at the review aggregation website Rotten Tomatoes, based on 106 reviews with an average rating of 7.2/10. The website's critical consensus reads, "A promising work by Lin, the energetic Better Luck Tomorrow is disturbing and thought-provoking." On Metacritic, the film has a weighted average score of 67 out of 100, based on 32 critics.

Peter Travers of Rolling Stone wrote "Lin is a talent to watch. There's a sting to this film that gets to you." Roger Ebert in the Chicago Sun-Times gave the film a full four-star-rating and wrote that it was a "disturbing and skillfully-told parable about growing up in today's America" and that Lin "reveals himself as a skilled and sure director". Ebert defended the filmmakers during a screening after an audience member accused them of misrepresenting their culture and race. Ebert declared "What I find very condescending and offensive about your statement, is nobody would say to a bunch of white filmmakers, 'how could you do this to your people?'". In 2018, Jane Yong Kim of The Atlantic wrote the film "[complicates] the question of Asian American representation in Hollywood in ways that still resonate deeply today".

=== Release ===
Better Luck Tomorrow opened on 13 screens on April 11, 2003, earning the highest per-screen average of any in film release at the time.

Much of the film's success was attributed to grassroots campaigning by young Asian-American viewers, particularly college students, who promoted the film on school campuses and online.

=== Awards and film festivals ===
- Official Selection and Grand Jury Prize Nomination – Sundance Film Festival, 2002. In a question and answer session following a festival screening, in response to an audience member who asked director Lin if he thought it was irresponsible to portray Asian-Americans in such a negative light, Roger Ebert stood up and said, angrily, "What I find very offensive and condescending about your statement is nobody would say to a bunch of white filmmakers, 'How could you do this to your people?'". And then he continued: "This film has the right to be about these people, and Asian-Americans have the right to be whatever the hell they want to be. They do not have to 'represent' their people." Ebert's approval of the film drew the attention of major studios, leading eventually to MTV's buying the film for distribution.
- Official Selection – Toronto International Film Festival, 2002. Lin said reception at the Toronto festival was notably different than Sundance with the audience more interested in discussing the state of youth rather than the race of the ethnicity of the actors. "In America, most of the time, I can't even get into talking about the issues, because they're just stuck on race," he said.
- Independent Spirit Awards – John Cassavetes Award Nomination, 2004

== Connection to the Fast & Furious franchise ==
Director Justin Lin later directed multiple films in the Fast & Furious franchise, with Kang reprising his role as Han Lue.

== See also ==
- Model minority
