= Fast & Furious (2009 film) =

2009 film by Justin Lin

- Theatrical release poster
- Directed by: Justin Lin
- Written by: Chris Morgan
- Based on: Characters by Gary Scott Thompson
- Produced by: Neal H. Moritz; Vin Diesel; Michael Fottrell
- Starring: Vin Diesel; Paul Walker; Michelle Rodriguez; Jordana Brewster; John Ortiz; Laz Alonso; Gal Gadot
- Cinematography: Amir Mokri
- Edited by: Christian Wagner; Fred Raskin
- Music by: Brian Tyler
- Production companies: Universal Pictures; Relativity Media; Original Film; One Race Films
- Distributed by: Universal Pictures
- Release dates: March 12, 2009 (Gibson Amphitheatre); April 3, 2009 (United States)
- Running time: 107 minutes
- Country: United States (Note: Attributed to multiple sources:)
- Language: English
- Budget: $85 million
- Box office: $360 million

Fast & Furious (also known as Fast & Furious 4) is a 2009 American action film directed by Justin Lin and written by Chris Morgan. It is the fourth film in the Fast & Furious franchise, serving as a direct sequel to The Fast and the Furious (2001) and 2 Fast 2 Furious (2003) and takes place before the events of The Fast and the Furious: Tokyo Drift (2006). The film stars Vin Diesel, Paul Walker, Michelle Rodriguez, and Jordana Brewster. In the film, Dominic Toretto and FBI agent Brian O'Conner are forced to work together to avenge the murder of Toretto's lover Letty Ortiz and apprehend drug lord Arturo Braga.

A fourth film was announced in July 2007, with the returns of Diesel, Walker, Rodriguez, and Brewster confirmed shortly after that. To account for the cast seeing absences from either of the previous two installments, the film was developed to place Tokyo Drift, as occurring beyond the events of Fast & Furious, while the short film Los Bandoleros (2009) was produced and released. Principal photography began in early February 2008 and wrapped up in August 2008, with filming locations including Los Angeles and the Dominican Republic. Lin, Morgan, and composer Brian Tyler returned in their roles from Tokyo Drift. Fast & Furious is the first theatrical release to feature 4DX and D-BOX motion. It was also the first film in the franchise to be produced by Diesel.

Fast & Furious premiered at Gibson Amphitheatre in Los Angeles on March 12, 2009, and was released in the United States on April 3 by Universal Pictures. The film received mixed reviews from critics, who criticized its script but praised the action sequences. It grossed $360 million worldwide, exceeding expectations to become the then-highest-grossing film in the franchise. It was followed by Fast Five in 2011.

== Plot ==
After planning and hijacking a fuel tanker (Note: As depicted in the short film prequel Los Bandoleros (2009)), Dominic Toretto and his crew, consisting of his girlfriend Letty, Tego Leo, Rico Santos, Cara, and Han Lue, have been living in the Dominican Republic for five years. Dom suspects the police are on their trail, and leaves Letty behind to protect her from being caught. Months later, in Panama City, Dom gets a call from his sister Mia who tells him Letty has been murdered. Dom heads to Los Angeles to attend her funeral and finds traces of nitromethane at the crash site. He coerces the local mechanic into giving the name of the buyer, David Park, and is informed that the only car that uses nitromethane in the area is a green 1972 Ford Torino Sport. Meanwhile, reinstated FBI agent Brian O'Conner (Note: Brian rejoined law enforcement after clearing his record following the arrest of Carter Verone in 2 Fast 2 Furious (2003)) is trying to track down Mexican drug lord, Arturo Braga, whose identity to the public is unknown; his search also leads him to Park.

Dom arrives at Park's apartment and hangs him out of the window by his ankles before Brian arrives. Brian saves Park, who in turn becomes the FBI's new informant and gets Brian into a street race. Brian selects a modified 2002 Nissan Skyline GT-R R34 from the impound lot; Dom also shows up in his 1970 Chevrolet Chevelle SS. Ramon Campos, Braga's second-in-command, and Gisele Yashar, Braga's liaison, reveal that the winner will become the last driver on a team that traffics heroin between the Mexico–United States border. Dom wins by bumping Brian's car while in nitro, making him lose control. Brian uses his power as an FBI agent to arrest another driver, Dwight Mueller, and takes his place on the team. The team meets up with Braga's henchman, Fenix, and Dom notices that Fenix drives the same Torino the mechanic described.

They drive across the border using tunnels to avoid detection. Dom confronts Fenix and learns that he kills the drivers after their work is done, and that he killed Letty when she tried to escape him. A stand-off ensues; Dom detonates his car with nitrous oxide to distract Braga's men, and Brian hijacks a 1999 Hummer H1 with $60 million worth of heroin in it. Brian and Dom drive back to Los Angeles and hide the heroin in a police impound lot, where they pick up a modified 2008 Subaru Impreza WRX STI hatchback; they drive to Dom's house and reunite with Mia. Dom attacks Brian when he discovers that Brian was the last person in contact with Letty; Brian explains Letty was working undercover, tracking Braga in exchange for clearing Dominic's record. Brian tells his superiors that in exchange for Dominic's pardon, he will lure Braga into a trap, forcing him to show up to exchange money for the heroin. At the drop site, the man who claims to be Braga is revealed as a decoy, and Campos—the real Braga—escapes with Fenix to Mexico. In the ensuing chaos, Fenix nearly runs over Gisele before Dom saves her. The failed trap results in Brian being taken off active duty.

With Gisele's help, Brian and Dom travel to Mexico to catch Braga in the Subaru and Dom's rebuilt 1970 Dodge Charger R/T, and apprehend him at a church. As Braga's henchmen try to rescue him, Brian and Dom drive through the tunnels back to the United States. Brian is pursued by Fenix ahead of the others until he is T-boned and pushed out of the tunnels. Before Fenix can kill him, Dom drives out of the tunnels and into Fenix, killing him. As police and helicopters approach the crash site on the American side of the border, Brian tells Dom to leave, but Dom says he is tired of running. Despite Brian's request for clemency, the judge sentences Dom to 25 years to life without parole. Brian resigns from the FBI and Dom boards a prison bus that will transport him to Lompoc penitentiary. As the bus drives down the road, Brian, Mia, Leo, and Santos arrive in their cars to intercept it.

== Cast ==
- Vin Diesel as Dominic Toretto: A professional street racer, criminal, and fugitive.
- Paul Walker as Brian O'Conner: An FBI agent and former LAPD police officer who previously aided Dom in avoiding law enforcement, and was in a relationship with Mia Toretto, which is later rekindled.
- Michelle Rodriguez as Letty Ortiz: Dominic's girlfriend, who seemingly dies in an automobile explosion caused by Fenix Calderon.
- Jordana Brewster as Mia Toretto: Dominic's sister and Brian's ex-girlfriend from five years ago, whose relationship is later rekindled.
- John Ortiz as Arturo Braga / Ramon Campos: A Mexican drug lord who recruits street racers to smuggle heroin across the Mexico–U.S. border.
- Laz Alonso as Fenix Calderon, Braga's right-hand man.
- Gal Gadot as Gisele Yashar: A liaison for Braga who shows a romantic interest in Dom.

The central cast is rounded out by Sung Kang as Han Lue, part in oil heist with Dom, Don Omar and Tego Calderon as Santos and Tego, members of the oil heist team, Shea Whigham as Brian's snarky colleague Michael Stasiak, Liza Lapira as Sophie Trinh, Brian's colleague, an FBI agent, Jack Conley as Richard Penning, Brian's boss. Braga's street racing members are played by Greg Cipes as Dwight Mueller, Neil Brown Jr. as Malik Herzon, and Brandon T. Jackson as Alex.

== Production ==
=== Development ===
After positive reception from audiences to Vin Diesel's cameo in The Fast and the Furious: Tokyo Drift (2006), Universal was confident in effectively reinventing the series with its original stars. The film was announced in July 2007, with Diesel, Paul Walker, Michelle Rodriguez, and Jordana Brewster of The Fast and the Furious (2001) reprising their roles.

=== Filming ===
Principal photography began in early February 2008 and wrapped in August 2008, with filming locations including Los Angeles and the Dominican Republic. Around 240 cars were built in Southern California's San Fernando Valley for the film. However, the replica vehicles do not match the specifications they were supposed to represent. For example, the replica version of F-Bomb, a 1973 Chevrolet Camaro built by Tom Nelson of NRE and David Freiburger of Hot Rod magazine, included a 300 hp crate V8 engine with a 3-speed automatic transmission, whereas the actual car included a twin-turbo 1,500 hp engine and a 5-speed transmission.

The original Dodge Charger 426 Hemi R/T that was used in the original movie was a 1970, but the car in this movie was a 1969 Dodge Charger R/T 426 Hemi with a slightly modified front grille and rear taillights to appear as a 1970 car; the original 1970 Dodge Charger was in pieces, being totally disassembled for restoration.

The original red 1970 Chevrolet Chevelle SS seen in the end credits of the first Fast & Furious movie, also makes an appearance, but is later highly modified for a street race.

The most radical vehicles built for the film were the Chevy trucks constructed for the fuel heist. Powered by 502ci GM big-block motors, the '67 had a giant ladder-bar suspension with airbags, a massive 10-ton semi rear axle, and the biggest and widest truck tires they could find. The '88 Chevy Crew Cab was built with twin full-floating GM 1-ton axles equipped with Detroit Lockers and a transfer case directing power to both axles and capable of four-wheel burnouts.

Another vehicle built for the film was the blue Nissan Skyline GT-R R34 owned by an uncredited owner, which brought a 241-mile-per-hour top speed at the Bayshore Route Highway in Japan. It was a hard car to build for production, so they made clones by acquiring Nissan Skyline 25GTs and making them look like the original car. The Skyline that was also used in the desert was actually a dune buggy using a Skyline R34's shell.

=== Visual effects and animation ===
Double Negative and Rhythm & Hues Studios (R&H) provided the visual effects and animation for the film. At Double Negative, Frazer Churchill served as the visual effects supervisor, and Moriah Etherington-Sparks served as the visual effects producer. Double Negative's role was to primarily work on the tunnel sequences of the film, which says, "The main action took place in the tunnels of an abandoned mine shaft used by a gang of drug smugglers." Churchill said, "Car chases in abandoned mine shafts are not easy to come up with! There aren't any shafts where you can film this kind of thing, so an environment was needed. As you would expect, the cars are the real stars of the film, so rather than doing the whole sequence in CGI, it was decided to shoot the cars as live-action and simulate the tunnel environment around them, so the environment was recreated in CGI."

Rhythm & Hues worked on the opening tanker explosion sequence. In a discussion with Ian Failes of Fxguide, Bob Mercier, the company's visual effects supervisor, commented that "[they] were involved before principal photography with the guys at Universal Pictures, Thad Beier, visual effects supervisor, and the director, Justin Lin, to try to figure out how we were going to shoot the plates." Concept work was done with ZBrush, and the final modeling was done with Maya. Mercier also said that the tanker crash sequence was primarily inspired by Twister (1996), the James Bond film Licence to Kill (1989), and searches on YouTube.

Hydraulx also provided visual effects for the film. Bill Kunin and company co-founder Colin Strause were the visual effects supervisors for the company on the film.

=== Music ===
The score to Fast & Furious was composed by Brian Tyler, who recorded his score with the Hollywood Studio Symphony at the Newman Scoring Stage at 20th Century Fox. The score album was released on CD by Varèse Sarabande Records with over 78 minutes' worth of music.

The trailers for the film feature the track "We Are Rockstars" by Does It Offend You, Yeah? and a Travis Barker-remixed version of "Crank That" by Soulja Boy Tell 'Em.

The official soundtrack was released on March 31, 2009, on Star Trak, with production handled primarily by The Neptunes. Singles include "Blanco" and "Krazy" by Pitbull and "Bad Girls" by Robin Thicke. The soundtrack also features the song "G-Stro" by Busta Rhymes featuring Pharrell Williams, a leftover track from Busta Rhymes' album Back on My B.S. Star Trak and Interscope Records released the soundtrack for the film with "Crank That" not included. Another song omitted was "Rising Sun" by South Korean group TVXQ.

The Japanese version of the movie features the song "Before I Decay" by Japanese rock group The Gazette.

== Release ==
=== Theatrical ===
It was originally set to release on June 5, 2009, but pushed back a week later to June 12, due to another Universal film Land of the Lost. The date was rescheduled for two months earlier on April 3, 2009. It was the first motion-enhanced theatrical film to feature 4DX and D-BOX motion feedback technologies in selected theaters.

=== Home media ===
Fast & Furious was released on DVD and Blu-ray on July 28, 2009. The DVD is a two-disc set that includes:

- Digital copy of the film
- Under the Hood: Muscle Cars & Imports
- High Octane Action: The Stunts
- Shooting the Big Rig Heist
- Driving School with Vin Diesel
- Original short film Los Bandoleros, the never-before-seen short film that reveals the events leading up to the explosive beginning of Fast & Furious. It is written and directed by Vin Diesel and was produced in the Dominican Republic. This was released on the iTunes Store as a free download.

As of June 2021, the DVD and Blu-ray sales have sold 4,616,164 copies generating $77,846,318 in sales revenue. It was re-released in Australia on Blu-ray including a digital copy and re-titled Fast & Furious 4 on March 30, 2011.

== Reception ==
=== Box office ===
On its first day of release, Fast & Furious grossed $30.6 million, and peaked at number one for the weekend box office (April 3-5) with $70,950,500—more than Tokyo Drift earned during its entire domestic theatrical run. The film recorded the sixth-largest opening weekend of 2009 and exceeded industry expectations, with its debut roughly twice as large as many analysts had predicted. It also surpassed The Lost World: Jurassic Park to become the biggest opening weekend ever for a film released by Universal Pictures at the time. The film also set records for the highest-grossing opening weekend in April and for a car-themed film, surpassing the previous record held by Cars ($60.1 million). Both records were later broken by Fast Five in 2011 ($86.2 million). Fast & Furious also held the record for the largest opening weekend for a spring release until it was surpassed by Tim Burton's Alice in Wonderland.

During its second weekend, it dropped to number two earning $27,237,905 behind Hannah Montana: The Movie ($32.3 million). The film earned $102.6 million during its opening weekend internationally, including $7.2 million in the United Kingdom, $8.6 million in Russia, $6 million in France, and $3 million in Germany. Fast & Furious concluded its theatrical run on July 2, 2009, with $155,064,265 in the United States and Canada and $205,302,605 in other territories, for a worldwide gross of $360,405,638, making it the 17th highest-grossing film of 2009 worldwide, the 15th highest-grossing film in North America, and the highest-grossing film in the Fast & Furious franchise at the time. In the $300 million mark, it ranked fifth behind Star Trek, Monsters vs. Aliens, X-Men Origins: Wolverine and Terminator Salvation.

=== Critical response ===
On the review aggregation website Rotten Tomatoes, 28% of 176 critics' reviews are positive, with an average rating of 4.7/10. The website's consensus reads, "While Fast and Furious features the requisite action and stunts, the filmmakers have failed to provide a competent story or compelling characters." Metacritic, which uses a weighted average, assigned the film a score of 46 out of 100, based on 28 critics, indicating "mixed or average" reviews. Audiences polled by CinemaScore gave the film an average grade of "A−" on an A+ to F scale.

Lisa Schwarzbaum of Entertainment Weekly gave the film a B+ and wrote, "Fast & Furious is still no Point Break. But it's perfectly aware of its limited dramatic mission ... it offers an attractive getaway route from self-importance, snark, and chatty comedies about male bonding." Writing for The Hollywood Reporter, Kirk Honeycutt called it "the first true sequel of the bunch. By reuniting the two male stars from the original and ... continuing the story from the first film, this new film should re-ignite the franchise." Betsy Sharkey of the Los Angeles Times considered it a "strange piece of nostalgia, where, without apology, fast cars still rule and fuel is burned with abandon." Roger Ebert, who had given positive reviews to the previous films, considered the story, dialogue, and acting to all be perfunctory: "I admire the craft involved, but the movie leaves me profoundly indifferent. After three earlier movies in the series, which have been transmuted into video games, why do we need a fourth one? Oh. I just answered my own question."

=== Accolades ===
Award	Category	Nominee	Result
Teen Choice Awards	Choice Movie: Action	Fast & Furious	Nominated
Teen Choice Awards	Choice Movie Actor: Action	Paul Walker	Nominated
Teen Choice Awards	Choice Movie Actress: Action	Jordana Brewster	Won
MTV Movie Awards	Best Male Performance	Vin Diesel	Nominated

== Sequels and follow-ups ==
This film was the last film of the franchise to feature street racing until Fast Forever, before transitioning into "more accessible action elements" with heist films in Fast Five (2011). It received praise and surpassed the box-office take of this film. They were followed by Fast & Furious 6 (2013) and Furious 7 (2015), with The Fate of the Furious (2017) serving as the start of a next trilogy of films that includes F9 (2021) and Fast X (2023). An eleventh and final mainline film, is in production and scheduled to release in March 2028.
