= Sean Boswell =

- First appearance: The Fast and the Furious: Tokyo Drift (2006)
- Last appearance: F9 (2021)
- Created by: Chris Morgan
- Portrayed by: Lucas Black

In-universe information
- Gender: Male

Sean Boswell is the protagonist of The Fast and the Furious: Tokyo Drift. He is a 17-year-old loner in school during the events of the film. After having three strikes of street racing in the United States, Sean's mother sends him to Tokyo, Japan, to live with his father and avoid jail time. In Japan, he is introduced to the drift racing scene and made good friends with Han, a former member of Dominic Toretto's crew and Sean's supporter throughout the film. He eventually meets Dom at the end of the film and raced him through a parking garage. After the race, he talks with Dom about Han and gives him some of Han's personal effects which were found after the crash.

Aside from Han and Dom, Sean had no connection to any other major characters in the series until F9, where Sean, along with Twinkie and Earl, who are now in their 20s, are all working at an airbase in Cologne, building a Pontiac Fiero with a rocket engine, and meet with Roman and Tej, who are looking for some vehicles on which they could get their hands on. They then test the rocket car while Roman and Tej observe, but the car explodes from some distance away. Sean and Earl then help Roman and Tej with their space mission in destroying Otto's satellite and both along with Twinkie join Dom and family at the 1327 house in Los Angeles, where the three reunite with Han. In Fast X, Sean is revealed to be one of Dante Reyes' targets from his vision board.

Sean Boswell was created by screenwriter Chris Morgan and is portrayed by Lucas Black.

== Film appearances ==
- The Fast and the Furious: Tokyo Drift
- Furious 7 (cameo)
- F9
