= Murder of Stuart Tay =

1992 murder in California, United States

Stuart Tay
- Portrait of Stuart Tay in the Orange County Register
- Born: Stuart Anthony Tay; December 8, 1975; Los Angeles, California
- Died: December 31, 1992 (aged 17); Buena Park, California
- Cause of death: Asphyxiation from blunt force trauma
- Resting place: Forest Lawn Memorial Park
- Education: Foothill High School

Stuart Anthony Tay (December 8, 1975 – December 31, 1992) was an American teenager from Orange County, California and a student at Foothill High School. Five teenagers believed that Tay was planning to betray them in a planned theft of computer equipment, so they arranged to kill him. All of the perpetrators were students at Sunny Hills High School. Most of the perpetrators had planned to attend elite colleges and universities, including Ivy League schools.

The perpetrators were 18-year-old Robert Chien-Nan Chan of the Sunny Hills area of Fullerton, California, 16-year-old Kirn Young Kim of the Islands community of Fullerton, 16-year-old Abraham Acosta of Buena Park, 17-year-old Mun Bong Kang of Fullerton, and 17-year-old Charles Bae Choe of Fullerton. All five suspects were convicted or pleaded guilty.

The Orange County Register referred to the crime as the "Honor Roll Murder". The victim and most of the perpetrators were Asian American.

The film Better Luck Tomorrow (2002) is loosely based on the murder.

== Background ==
Tay's parents immigrated from Singapore to the United States. Beginning in 1976 the family resided in Orange County, California. The family was Chinese American in terms of their ethnic background.

The prosecutor said that Tay used an alias and presented himself as an older person. He and Chan created a scheme to rob a computer parts dealer in Anaheim, and then recruited four other persons as part of the plot. In court Chan said that Choe helped recruit the other participants. The prosecutor said that Chan created a plan to kill Tay when he learned that Tay was lying about his name and age. The suspects feared that Tay would betray them.

The Tay family had hired a private investigator who said that Chan had attacked Tay partly due to issues over a girl who had refused to date Chan. The police said that this theory is not true. The planned robbery never occurred.

== The murder ==
On New Year's Eve 1992, the perpetrators lured Tay to the back yard of the Buena Park, California residence of Abraham Acosta. Kirn Kim acted as a lookout. Prosecutors said that the perpetrators had made preparations before the murder, having dug a grave 24 hours prior. The perpetrators held rehearsals for the murder and purchased gloves so they would not leave fingerprints behind.

In the backyard, the perpetrators hit Tay with a baseball bat and a sledgehammer. Chan and Acosta hit Tay. Tay did not die immediately, so the perpetrators forced Tay to drink rubbing alcohol. His mouth was then taped shut. After Tay died, he was buried in the grave. Acosta had taken $100 from Tay's wallet. The perpetrators drove Tay's car to Compton to give the impression that Tay had been carjacked. Choe said that Chan dug the grave and poured the rubbing alcohol down Tay's throat. The authorities discovered Tay's body at the Acosta residence. Orange County authorities stated that Tay's death occurred due to asphyxiation on vomit; authorities argued that this was most likely due to the head injuries, and that the taping of the nose and mouth may have quickened his death.

== Criminal trials and sentencing ==
Charles Choe pleaded guilty to first degree murder and acted as the key prosecution witness in exchange for being prosecuted as a juvenile instead of as an adult. Mun Bong Kang pleaded guilty.

In his trial, Chan said that he did not mastermind the killing of Tay, and that he believed that Tay put explosives in his house and would kill him if Tay was not himself killed. A juror who spoke under anonymity said "There was no doubt that he was the mastermind. He tried to lie and blame others for it, but if there was no Robert Chan, Stuart Tay would still be alive today." On Tuesday May 3, 1994, Robert Chan was convicted of first-degree murder. The jury took less than three hours to reach the verdict. Ulla Lang, a juror from Huntington Beach, said "I was surprised at how fast the verdict took [sic], but there was really nothing to decide. He got on the witness stand and said he did it and he knew what he was doing. It's like the prosecutor said—he convicted himself." Chan was sentenced to life in prison without parole.

On Friday July 1, 1994, Kirn Kim and Abraham Acosta were convicted of first degree murder. Acosta was convicted of ambushing his victim. Jurors acquitted Kim of ambushing his victim. Even though Acosta had taken $100 from Tay, jurors acquitted Acosta of killing for financial gain. Acosta was sent to a California Youth Authority (CYA) facility.

Choe was sent to a CYA facility. In January 1995 Kirn Kim and Mun Kang were sentenced to 25 years to life in prison. Kim and Kang had asked the court system to send them to the CYA system instead of the adult criminal system. David G. Sills, the judge of the 4th District Court of Appeal in Santa Ana did not do so due to the severity of the crime. Chan, California Department of Corrections and Rehabilitation (CDCR) inmate number J30838, was admitted into the system on August 12, 1994 and, as of 2023, is incarcerated at Avenal State Prison. Kirn Young Kim, CDCR#J40983, was admitted on February 9, 1995 and was incarcerated at Richard J. Donovan Correctional Facility. Kirn Kim had been transferred to the Donovan prison near San Diego by 2002.

== Aftermath ==
Rene Lynch of the Los Angeles Times said, "The sophisticated murder scheme and the sheer senselessness of the killing grabbed headlines from the start" and that residents of Orange County were "shocked" "because the assailants and the victim were such unlikely suspects." Lynch added that "The case has gained widespread attention, both as a symbol of juvenile crime out of control and because both teenagers came from seemingly model homes."

In 1995, a court awarded Alfred and Linda Tay, the parents of the deceased victim, over $1 million from four of the killers, while the parents of Tay reached a $100,000 settlement with a fifth killer.

In 1994, Linda Tay attended a conference asking for stricter sentencing of juvenile convicts. Governor of California Pete Wilson was at this conference.

Kirn Young Kim was paroled in 2012.

While the plot of the film Better Luck Tomorrow was loosely based on the Tay murder, and director Justin Lin said that he had tracked the Tay incident in newspapers, Daniel Yi of the Los Angeles Times stated that Lin, in Yi's words, "describes his movie as a work of pure fiction that draws on" many inspirations "to tell a story about youth violence." Nary Kim, a JD candidate at UC Berkeley School of Law, stated that "In spite of this disclaimer, it is my view that Better Luck Tomorrow is faithful to many of the details surrounding" the incident, and therefore the film is "a useful (albeit fictionalized) point of reference for studying the real-life case."

== See also ==
- Singaporean Americans
