= Sung Kang =

American actor (born 1972)

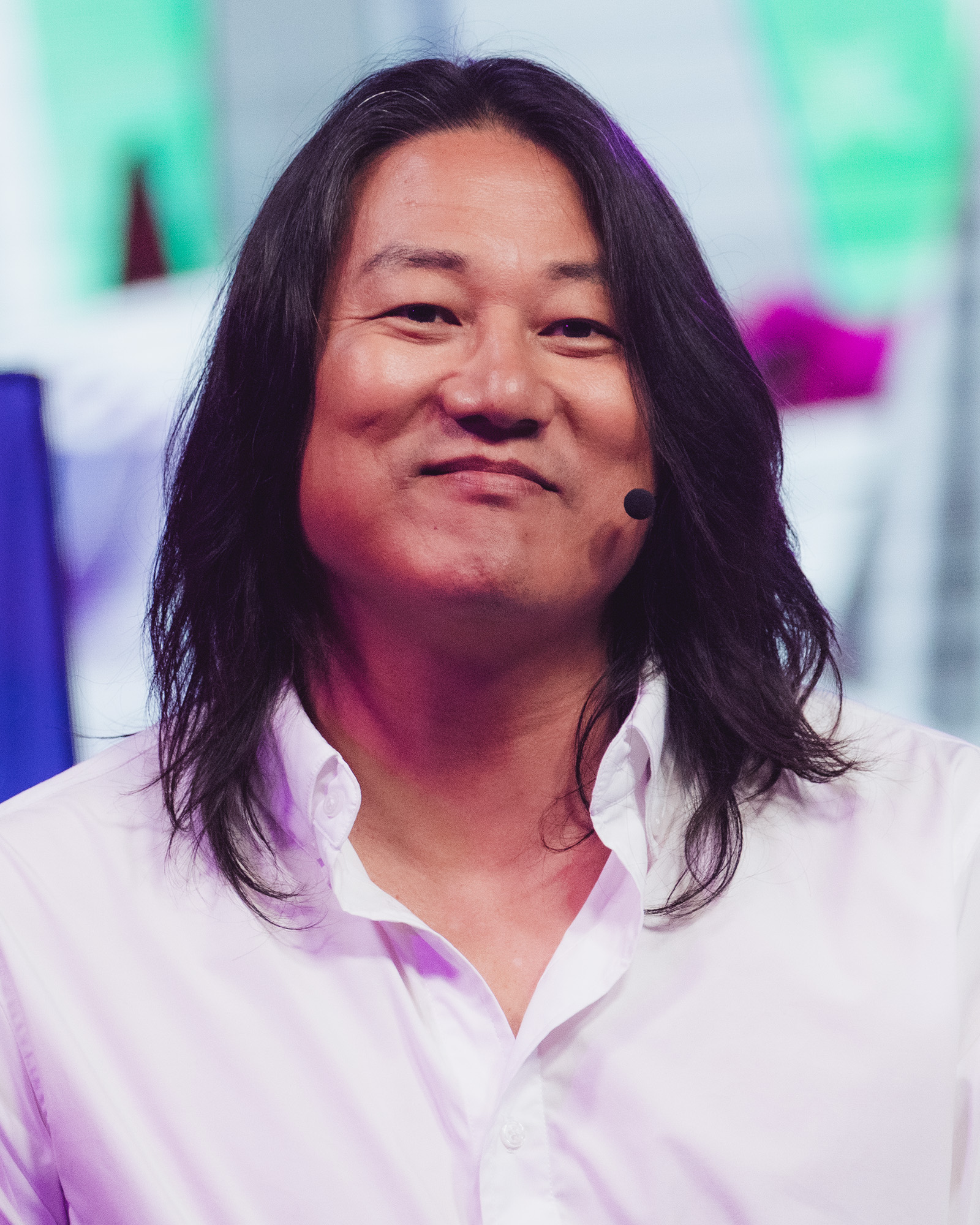
- Kang in 2026
- Born: Sung-Ho Kang; April 8, 1972 (age 54); Clarkston, Georgia, U.S.
- Occupations: Actor; director; producer
- Years active: 1999–present
- Spouse: Miki Yim

Korean name
- Hangul: 강성호
- Hanja: 姜成鎬
- RR: Gang Seongho
- MR: Kang Sŏngho

Sung-Ho Kang (Korean: 강성호; born April 8, 1972) is an American actor. His first major role was as Han Lue in Better Luck Tomorrow (2002), a character he has since portrayed in the Fast & Furious franchise (2006–present). Kang also played John Mak in the Starz series Power (2017–2020) and the Fifth Brother in Disney+ miniseries Obi-Wan Kenobi (2022).

== Early life ==
Kang was born in Clarkston, Georgia, to Korean immigrant parents. He was raised by his Korean mother and his African American stepfather in Gainesville, Georgia. He moved to Barstow, California, while in high school.

Kang attended the University of California, Riverside. While in college, he chose acting over law school.

== Career ==
Kang's first major role was in Better Luck Tomorrow (2002), directed by Justin Lin, in which he played Han Lue, an aloof gang member. He was one of the stars in The Motel, in which he played Sam Kim.

Kang reprised his role as Han Lue in the Fast & Furious franchise, first appearing in The Fast and the Furious: Tokyo Drift, Lin's second movie. Kang's role in Tokyo Drift was originally written as a one-off character in an almost straight-to-DVD release: an opportunity for a rapper to make a cameo, tossing his keys to the main character (portrayed by Lucas Black). As production progressed, Lin expanded Han to a significant supporting character who proved "emotionally affecting" and provided "a more delicate touch than the Fast movies had seen before, or since". In portraying Han, Kang emulated "the laid-back cool of the Paul Newmans and Steve McQueens" with "an added Pitt-esque obsession with constantly snacking". An unexpected fan favorite, Kang was brought back to the Fast & Furious franchise by Lin, appearing in Fast & Furious, Fast Five, Fast & Furious 6, and the short film Los Bandoleros.

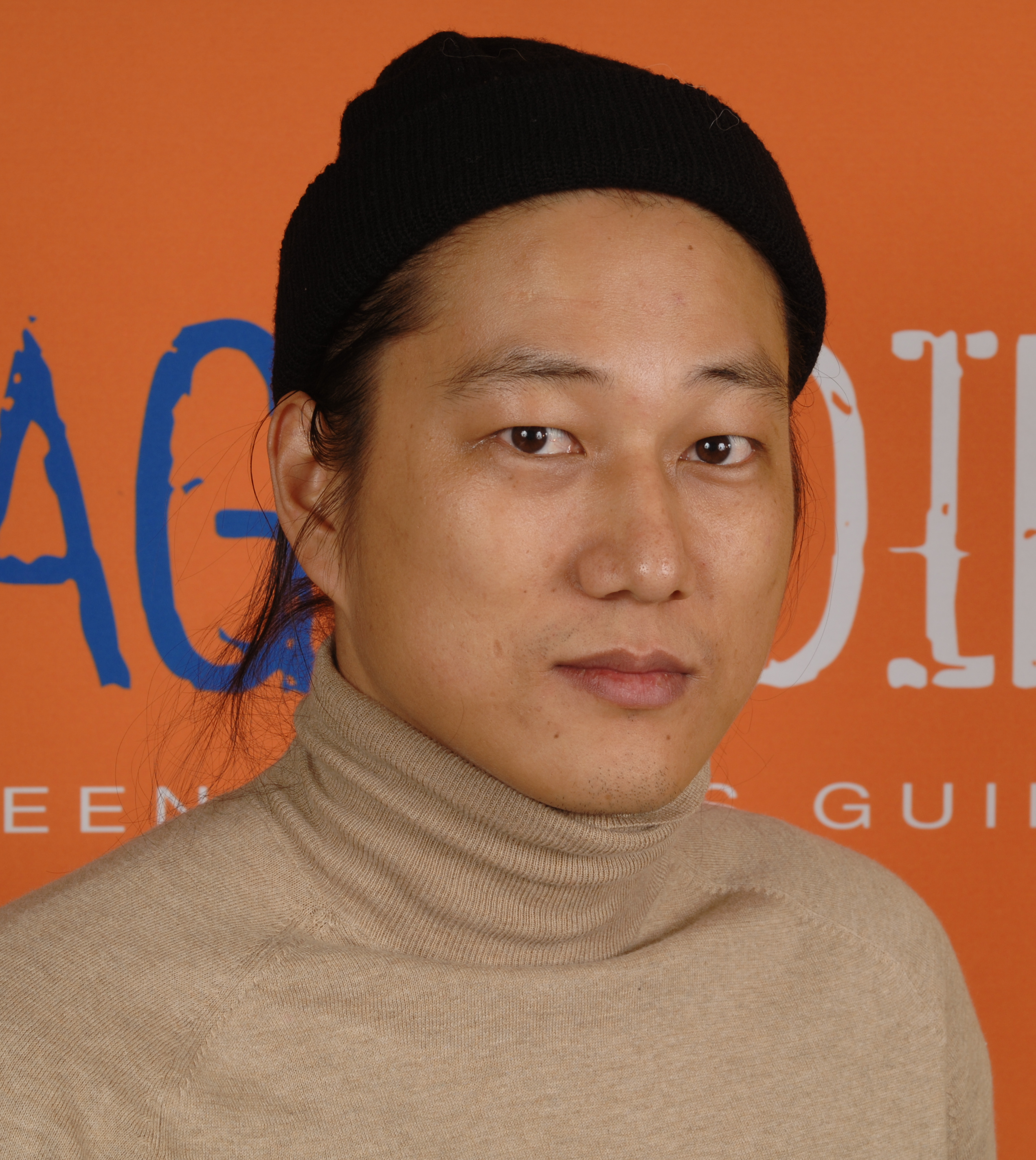
Kang in 2007

Kang played an FBI agent in Jet Li's film War (2007), and was featured in the movie Forbidden Warrior as Doran, a son of Genghis Khan. He had a small role in the action movie Live Free or Die Hard, and he appeared in Walter Hill's movie Bullet to the Head (2013), as Detective Taylor Kwon, opposite Sylvester Stallone.

Kang has had several notable television roles, including the recurring role of the narcissistic President Gin Kew Yun Chun Yew Nee in the Korean drama parody "Tae Do (Attitudes and Feelings, Both Desirable and Sometimes Secretive)" alongside Bobby Lee on MADtv. He portrayed FBI Agent Tae Kim in the short-lived crime procedural Gang Related on FOX. Both roles required him to speak Korean, which he is conversant in. The character Tae Kim was written for him by creator Chris Morgan, with whom he had worked on the Fast & Furious franchise.

In 2018, he played Detective Yoshi Tanaka in the Magnum P.I. reboot pilot, which was directed and produced by Lin.

Kang started the YouTube channel "Sung's Garage" in January 2020, which hosts the videos for the podcast of the same name.

Kang credits reporter Jen Yamato of the Los Angeles Times and her #JusticeForHan social media campaign for rallying public interest and bringing the character of Han Lue back to the Fast & Furious franchise, in which he reprises his role in F9 (2021), reuniting with director Lin once more.

In 2022, Kang portrayed Fifth Brother in the Disney+ series Obi-Wan Kenobi. The same year, Kang made his directorial debut in the horror comedy film Shaky Shivers.

== Filmography ==
Key
†	Denotes films that have not yet been released

=== Film ===
Year	Title	Role	Notes
1999	Mystery Men	Susie	
2000	Talk to Taka		Also co-producer
2001	Pearl Harbor	Listener / Japanese Translator	
2002	Better Luck Tomorrow	Han Lue	Also associate producer
2002	Antwone Fisher	The Receptionist	
2004	9:30	Chan Kin Fai	Short film
2004	Forbidden Warrior	Doran	
2005	The Motel	Sam Kim	
2006	The Fast and the Furious: Tokyo Drift	Han Lue	
2006	Undoing	Samuel Kim	Also producer
2007	War	FBI Agent Goi	
2007	Finishing the Game	Cole Kim	
2007	Live Free or Die Hard	FBI Desk Officer Raj	
2009	Fast & Furious	Han Lue	
2009	Los Bandoleros	Han Lue	Short film
2009	Ninja Assassin	"Hollywood"	
2009	Clap Clap	Roy	Short film
2011	Fast Five	Han Lue	
2011	4 Wedding Planners	Kai	
2012	Sunset Stories	J.P.	
2012	Bullet to the Head	Detective Taylor Kwon	
2013	Fast & Furious 6	Han Lue	
2013	The Come Up	Douchey Actor	Short film
2015	Eden	Connie	
2015	Furious 7	Han Lue	Archive footage
2015	Hollywood Adventures	Bung Ho Lee / "Manny Love"	
2016	Pali Road	Mitch Kayne	
2016	The Free World	Detective Shin	
2016	Code 8	Officer Alex Park	Short film
2017	Party Boat	Greg	
2019	Code 8	Officer Alex Park	
2020	We Can Be Heroes	Blinding Fast	
2021	Raya and the Last Dragon	Dang Hai	Voice
2021	F9	Han Lue	
2021	Snakehead	"Rambo"	
2022	Shaky Shivers	—N/a	Director
2023	Fast X	Han Lue	
2024	Weekend in Taipei	Kwang	
2024	Thirsty	T.K. Kim	
2025	Worth the Wait	Curtis	
2026	Drifter	Tree	Director, writer, and producer

=== Television ===
Year	Title	Role	Notes
1999	Felicity	Student	1 episode
2000	Martial Law	Xian Law	3 episodes
2001	NYPD Blue	Asian Uniform	1 episode
2002	Girlfriends	Bartender	1 episode
2002	Spin City	Jordan	1 episode
2003	The Shield	Malcom Rama	1 episode
2004	Threat Matrix	Ray Lee	1 episode
2004	Cold Case	Sen Dhiet / Varin Toan	1 episode
2005	Without a Trace	Deke	1 episode
2005–2009	Monk	Mr. Huang (Disciple) / Vince Kuramoto	2 episodes
2006–2008	Mad TV	President Gin Kew Yun Chun Yew Nee	4 episodes
2006	Standoff	David Lau	1 episode
2006	CSI: Miami	Lee Choi	1 episode
2008	Knight Rider	Johnny Chang	1 episode
2008	CSI: Crime Scene Investigation	Jang	1 episode
2009	Mental	Jimmy	1 episode
2010	Easy to Assemble	Sung Skjulstad / Sung Skjulestad	Web series; 3 episodes
2014	Robot Chicken	Hook / Stratos	Voice; 1 episode
2014	Gang Related	Tae Kim	Main role; 13 episodes
2016	Family Guy	Soap Opera Actor	Voice; episode: "Candy, Quahog Marshmallow"
2016	Hawaii Five-0	Dae Wan	1 episode
2017–2020	Power	Assistant U.S. Attorney John Mak	Main role; 22 episodes
2018	Magnum P.I.	Lieutenant Yoshi Tanaka	1 episode
2019	Whiskey Cavalier	Daniel Lou	1 episode
2020	Power Book II: Ghost	Assistant U.S. Attorney John Mak	3 episodes
2021	Lisey's Story	Officer Dan Beckman	Miniseries; 7 episodes
2022	Obi-Wan Kenobi	The Fifth Brother	Miniseries; 4 episodes
2023	Hot Wheels: Ultimate Challenge	Himself	Guest judge; episode: "Skater Boy vs. Jaipur Jewel"

=== Music videos ===
Year	Title	Artist(s)	Ref.
2000	"Lies"	g.o.d.	
2006	"Round Round"	Far East Movement (feat. Storm)	
2007	"Satisfaction"	Far East Movement	

=== Video games ===
Year	Title	Voice role
2013	Fast & Furious: Showdown	Han Lue
