= Paul Walker filmography =

List of films featuring Paul Walker

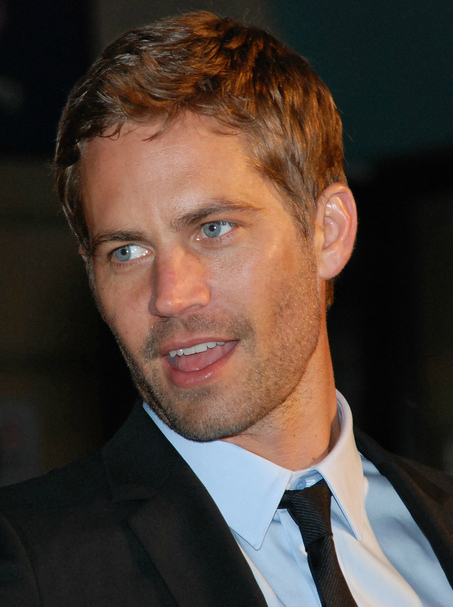
- Paul Walker at the premiere of Fast & Furious in London, March 2009
- Film: 32
- Television: 13
- Music videos: 2
- Advertising: 1

Paul Walker was an American actor. The following were his roles in film, television, and music videos.

== Film ==
Year	Title	Role	Notes
1986	Monster in the Closet	"Professor" Bennett	
1987	Programmed to Kill	Jason	Credited as Paul W. Walker
1994	Tammy and the T-Rex	Michael Brock	
1998	Meet the Deedles	Phil Deedle	
1998	Pleasantville	Skip Martin	
1999	Varsity Blues	Lance Harbor	
1999	She's All That	Dean Sampson, Jr.	
1999	Brokedown Palace	Jason	Uncredited
2000	The Skulls	Caleb Mandrake	
2001	The Fast and the Furious	Brian O'Conner	
2001	Joy Ride	Lewis Thomas	
2002	Life Makes Sense If You're Famous	Mikey	Short film, segment featured in Stories USA (2007)
2003	The Turbo Charged Prelude for 2 Fast 2 Furious	Brian O'Conner	Short film
2003	2 Fast 2 Furious	Brian O'Conner	
2003	Timeline	Chris Johnston	
2004	Noel	Michael "Mike" Riley	
2005	Into the Blue	Jared Cole	
2006	Eight Below	Jerry Shepard	
2006	Running Scared	Joey Gazelle	
2006	Flags of Our Fathers	Hank Hansen	
2007	The Death and Life of Bobby Z	Tim Kearney	
2008	The Lazarus Project	Ben Garvey	
2009	Fast & Furious	Brian O'Conner	
2010	Takers	John Rahway	
2011	Fast Five	Brian O'Conner	
2012	Air Racers 3D	Narrator	Documentary, voice role
2013	Vehicle 19	Michael Woods	Also executive producer
2013	Fast & Furious 6	Brian O'Conner	
2013	Pawn Shop Chronicles	Raw Dog	Also producer
2013	Hours	Nolan Hayes	Posthumous release, also executive producer
2014	Brick Mansions	Damien Collier	Posthumous release, dedicated in memory
2015	Furious 7	Brian O'Conner	Posthumous release, dedicated in memory, final film role

== Television ==
Year	Title	Role	Notes
1984, 1994	CBS Schoolbreak Special	n/a, Dill	Episodes: "Dead Wrong: The John Evans Story" and "Love in the Dark Ages"
1985, 1986	Highway to Heaven	Todd Bryant, Eric Travers	Episodes: "Birds of a Feather" and "A Special Love (Parts 1 & 2)"
1986–1987	Throb	Jeremy Beatty	12 episodes
1988	I'm Telling!	Himself	1 episode, contestant
1990	Charles in Charge	Russell Davis	Episode: "Dead Puck Society"
1991	Who's the Boss?	Michael Haynes	Episode: "You Can Go Home Again"
1991	What a Dummy	Rick	Episode: "Bringing Up Baby"
1992	The Young and the Restless	Brandon Collins	14 episodes (+ 10 "credits only")
1994	The Boys Are Back	Jesse Hansen	Pilot
1996	Touched by an Angel	Jonathan	Episode: "Statute of Limitations"
2010	Shark Men	Himself	3 episodes, Expedition Great White
2013	Conan	Brian O'Conner	Episode: "The Very Understated Adventures of Captain Beige"
2013, 2014	Shark Week	Himself	2 episodes, Spawn of Jaws and posthumous release, Spawn of Jaws: The Birth

== Music videos ==
Year	Artists	Song	Notes
1998	The Mighty Mighty Bosstones	"Wrong Thing Right Then"	
2003	Ludacris	"Act a Fool"	

== Advertising ==
Year	Title	Role	Notes
2011	Cool Water	Himself	Television commercial
