= The Fate of the Furious =

2017 film by F. Gary Gray

- Theatrical release poster
- Directed by: F. Gary Gray
- Written by: Chris Morgan
- Based on: Characters by Gary Scott Thompson
- Produced by: Neal H. Moritz; Vin Diesel; Michael Fottrell; Chris Morgan
- Starring: Vin Diesel; Dwayne Johnson; Jason Statham; Michelle Rodriguez; Tyrese Gibson; Chris "Ludacris" Bridges; Kurt Russell; Charlize Theron
- Cinematography: Stephen F. Windon
- Edited by: Christian Wagner; Paul Rubell
- Music by: Brian Tyler
- Production companies: Universal Pictures; Original Film; One Race Films
- Distributed by: Universal Pictures
- Release dates: April 4, 2017 (Berlin); April 14, 2017 (United States)
- Running time: 136 minutes
- Country: United States
- Language: English
- Budget: $250–270 million
- Box office: $1.236 billion

The Fate of the Furious (Note: Also known F8, F8: The Fate of the Furious, or Fast & Furious 8) is a 2017 American action film directed by F. Gary Gray and written by Chris Morgan. It is the sequel to Furious 7 (2015) and the eighth installment in the Fast & Furious franchise. The film stars Vin Diesel as Dominic Toretto, alongside Dwayne Johnson, Jason Statham, Michelle Rodriguez, Tyrese Gibson, Chris "Ludacris" Bridges, Scott Eastwood, Nathalie Emmanuel, Elsa Pataky, Kurt Russell, and Charlize Theron. In the film, Dom has settled down with his wife Letty Ortiz, until cyberterrorist Cipher (Theron) coerces him into working for her and turns him against his team, forcing them to find Dom and take down Cipher.

The eighth installment was planned since 2014, and in March 2015 it was revealed the film would be set in New York City. Preparations for the film began immediately before the release of Furious 7, with Diesel, Morgan, and producer Neal H. Moritz re-signing. After setting an initial release date in that same month, casting took place between April and June. In October, Gray was announced to direct the film in the place of James Wan, who had directed the previous installment. Composer Brian Tyler, who had scored the third, fourth, fifth, and seventh installments, returned to compose the score.

Principal photography began in March 2016 in locations such as Mývatn, Havana, Atlanta, Cleveland, and New York City, continuing the franchise's tradition of filming around the world. With an estimated production budget of up to $270 million, it is one of the most expensive films ever made. This is the first film in the series since The Fast and the Furious: Tokyo Drift (2006) not to star Paul Walker as Brian O'Conner, following his death in November 2013.

The Fate of the Furious premiered in Berlin on April 4, 2017, and was theatrically released in the United States on April 14, by Universal Pictures. It received mixed-to-positive reviews from critics, with praise for the performances of the cast and action sequences but criticism for the storyline. The film was a box office success, grossing over $1.2 billion worldwide, making it the thirtieth film (and the second in the franchise, after Furious 7) to gross over $1 billion, the third-highest-grossing film of 2017, and the eleventh highest-grossing film of all time at the time. It also grossed $541.9 million worldwide during its opening weekend, which made it the highest-grossing worldwide opening of all time until the release of Avengers: Infinity War a year later. The film was followed by a spin-off, Hobbs & Shaw (2019), and a direct sequel, F9 (2021).

== Plot ==
Dominic Toretto and Letty Ortiz are on their honeymoon in Havana when Dom's cousin Fernando gets in trouble owing money to local racer Raldo. Sensing Raldo is a loan shark, Dom challenges him to a race, pitting Fernando's 1949 Chevrolet Fleetline against Raldo's 1956 Ford Fairlane Crown Victoria, and wagering his own 1961 Chevrolet Impala. After narrowly winning the race, Dom allows Fernando to keep his Impala.

The next day, a mysterious woman named Cipher coerces Dom into working for her by showing him something on her phone. DSS agent Luke Hobbs is assigned an off-the-books mission to retrieve an EMP device from a military outpost in Berlin and is warned that he will face arrest if captured. Hobbs recruits Dom and his team, which includes Letty, Roman Pearce, Tej Parker, and Ramsey, to assist him.

During the getaway, Dom steals the device for Cipher, who is a cyberterrorist. Hobbs is arrested and confined in the same high-security prison that holds Deckard Shaw. Intelligence operative Mr. Nobody initiates a prison escape to recruit the pair to help Dom's team track down Dom and capture Cipher. When Hobbs and the team protest working with Deckard, he reveals that Cipher had hired his brother Owen to steal an electromagnetic pulse weapon called Nightshade (Note: As depicted in Fast & Furious 6 (2013)) and Mose Jakande to steal God's Eye, a mass surveillance computer program created by Ramsey, (Note: As depicted in Furious 7 (2015)) and so has his reasons for wanting revenge on her. Dom and Cipher then attack the team's base, stealing God's Eye.

It is revealed that Cipher secured Dom's loyalty by holding hostage his ex-lover and DSS agent Elena Neves, along with their baby son, whose existence Dom was unaware of. Cipher sends Dom to retrieve a nuclear football held by the Russian Minister of Defense in New York City in his 1971 Plymouth GTX. With Raldo's help, Dom briefly evades Cipher and persuades Deckard and Owen's mother, Magdalene, to assist him, offering to arrange the Shaw brothers' freedom from government custody if they rescue his son from Cipher's plane.

The team intercepts Dom in their cars, but he escapes and seemingly kills Deckard. Letty takes the football but is nearly killed by Cipher's enforcer, Connor Rhodes, before Dom stops him and forces Letty to return the football. In retaliation, Cipher has Rhodes kill Elena in front of Dom, threatening to kill his son next if he fails to follow her orders again. Dom infiltrates a military base in Russia, using the EMP device to activate a nuclear submarine, allowing Cipher to hijack it so she can use its arsenal to trigger a nuclear war.

The team intercepts, shutting down the submarine's nuclear weapons and driving toward the gates to prevent the sub from leaving to the sea. Deckard, who faked his death with the help of Magdalene, teams up with Owen and infiltrates Cipher's plane to rescue Dom's son. Once Deckard reports that the child is safe, Dom turns on Cipher and kills Rhodes. Cipher fires an infrared homing missile at Dom's Charger, but he lures the missile to the trailing submarine, which is destroyed. Deckard confronts Cipher, but she escapes from the plane by parachute.

Hobbs has his record cleared and is offered his DSS job back, but declines in order to spend more time with his daughter. Deckard delivers Dom's son, setting aside differences, and is accepted into the family. Dom names his son Brian and celebrates with everyone at a rooftop dinner.

== Cast ==
- Vin Diesel as Dominic Toretto: A former criminal, professional street racer and millionaire who has retired and settled down with his wife, Letty.
- Dwayne Johnson as Luke Hobbs: A former DSS agent who allied with Dom and his team following their outings in Rio de Janeiro and Europe.
- Jason Statham as Deckard Shaw: A former special forces soldier and intelligence agent who was imprisoned by Hobbs and the DSS after his defeat in Los Angeles, who serves as an ally to help Dom's team take down Cipher.
- Michelle Rodriguez as Letty Ortiz: A former professional street racer, married to Dom and the stepmother of Brian Marcos.
- Tyrese Gibson as Roman Pearce: A former criminal from Barstow and a member of Dom's team.
- Ludacris (credited as Chris “Ludacris” Bridges) as Tej Parker: A mechanic from Miami and a member of Dom's team.
- Scott Eastwood as Little Nobody: A law enforcement agent working under Mr. Nobody.
- Nathalie Emmanuel as Ramsey: A British computer hacktivist and a member of Dom's team.
- Elsa Pataky as Elena Neves: The biological mother of Brian Marcos and a former Rio de Janeiro police officer who moved to the United States to become Hobbs' new partner at the DSS.
- Kurt Russell as Mr. Nobody: An intelligence operative and the leader of a covert ops team which previously aided Dom and his team in taking down Deckard in Abu Dhabi.
- Charlize Theron as Cipher: A criminal mastermind and cyberterrorist who coerces Dom into working against his team by holding Elena and their son hostage.

Tego Calderón and Don Omar reprise their respective roles as Tego Leo and Rico Santos, former members of Dom's team, from Los Bandoleros (2009), Fast & Furious (2009) and Fast Five (2011). Kristofer Hivju portrays Connor Rhodes, Cipher's right-hand man and second-in-command. Patrick St. Esprit appears as DS Allen. Luke Evans reprises his role from Fast & Furious 6 (2013) and Furious 7 (2015) as Owen Shaw, Deckard's younger brother and former mercenary who previously opposed Dom's team in Europe, and who helps his brother in rescuing Dom's son. Helen Mirren makes an uncredited cameo appearance as Magdalene Shaw, the mother of Deckard and Owen Shaw. Celestino Cornielle portrays Raldo, a street racer whose respect Dom earns, while Janmarco Santiago portrays Fernando, Dom's cousin who lives in Havana.

== Production ==
=== Development ===
We're trying to do what we always do, which is try to come at it from a character point of view and figure out where the characters would go from here. I think the thing that's made The Fast and the Furious special is obviously we have incredible action and so on. But the thing that people really relate to the most is the characters. We're lucky that we have a lot of great characters. Unfortunately, we don't have Paul [Walker] anymore. His character... has moved on. But we feel like there's a lot still to be mined. That's where we're starting. We're really talking about the characters, where they all sit right now. It's a huge challenge.

— Neal H. Moritz, The Fast and the Furious franchise producer

In November 2014, Universal Pictures chairwoman Donna Langley confirmed that a discussion regarding three sequels to Furious 7 (2015) had taken place. Actor Vin Diesel reaffirmed this in September 2015, alluding the trilogy could lead to the mainline series' conclusion. He stated that the eighth film was acceptable as Paul Walker said.

Diesel further hinted at an eighth film on Jimmy Kimmel Live! when he stated that Kurt Russell's character would span multiple films. He also stated that the next film would take place in New York City. Chris Morgan returned to write his sixth script in the franchise, while Neal H. Moritz returned to produce. Moritz later stated, "[The story] is going to have to be something enticing for all of us. It has to be as good as or better [than Furious 7]".

At the 2015 CinemaCon in Las Vegas, Diesel announced the film for an April 14, 2017 release date. In August, at the 2015 Teen Choice Awards (where Furious 7 received the award for Choice Movie – Action and Walker received the award for Choice Movie Actor – Action), Diesel gave the film the initial title Fast 8. In September, Diesel stated that the script had almost been completed, and expressed interest in Rob Cohen, who directed the first film, to direct the eighth installment. Furious 7 (2015) film director James Wan was originally contractually hired to direct this film and F9 (2021), but the studio let him go after he told them about his wishes to make The Conjuring 2 (2016), a sequel to his previous horror film The Conjuring (2013). The studio went back to offer Wan directing the film after Justin Lin, who directed the film series since The Fast and the Furious: Tokyo Drift (2006) to Fast & Furious 6 (2013), chose to direct Star Trek Beyond (2016) over returning to the series, but Wan firmly declined directing both this film and the ninth film due to the seventh film's demanding production impacting on his health. In October, Diesel announced on The Tonight Show Starring Jimmy Fallon that Straight Outta Compton (2015) director F. Gary Gray would direct the film.

In July, Moritz said that Walker's character, Brian O'Conner, would not appear in the film, following the use of CGI in the previous film after Walker died in a single-vehicle accident in November 2013, with Moritz stating that his character had "moved on". It had previously been reported that Paul's younger brother, Cody Walker, would either join the cast in a new role, or replace his older brother in the role of O'Conner; however, it was later announced that the character will not return to the franchise. Moritz also said that the film would shift the focus of the franchise from a series of heist films to spy films, following a similar change in focus from street racing to heist films in Fast Five (2011). In December 2016, the film was retitled The Fate of the Furious.

=== Casting ===
Diesel, Russell, and Michelle Rodriguez were the first to confirm their involvement in the film, and Tyrese Gibson and Ludacris both confirmed their return soon after. Diesel was paid $20 million for his involvement. Lucas Black had signed on to reprise his role from The Fast and the Furious: Tokyo Drift (2006) as Sean Boswell for Furious 7 (2015), this installment and F9 (2021) in September 2013. In May 2015, Dwayne Johnson confirmed his involvement in the film, additionally hinting at a possible spin-off film involving his character, Luke Hobbs. Jason Statham also confirmed his return that same month. In April 2016, Charlize Theron and Kristofer Hivju were confirmed as additions to the cast, in villainous roles, while Scott Eastwood also joined the film as a law enforcement agent. In May, Nathalie Emmanuel was confirmed to reprise her role as Ramsey in the film. In June, Helen Mirren announced in an interview with Elle that she would appear in the film. During an interview with Chris Mannix in July, Lucas Black confirmed he would not appear in the eighth installment, due to scheduling conflicts with NCIS: New Orleans.

=== Filming ===
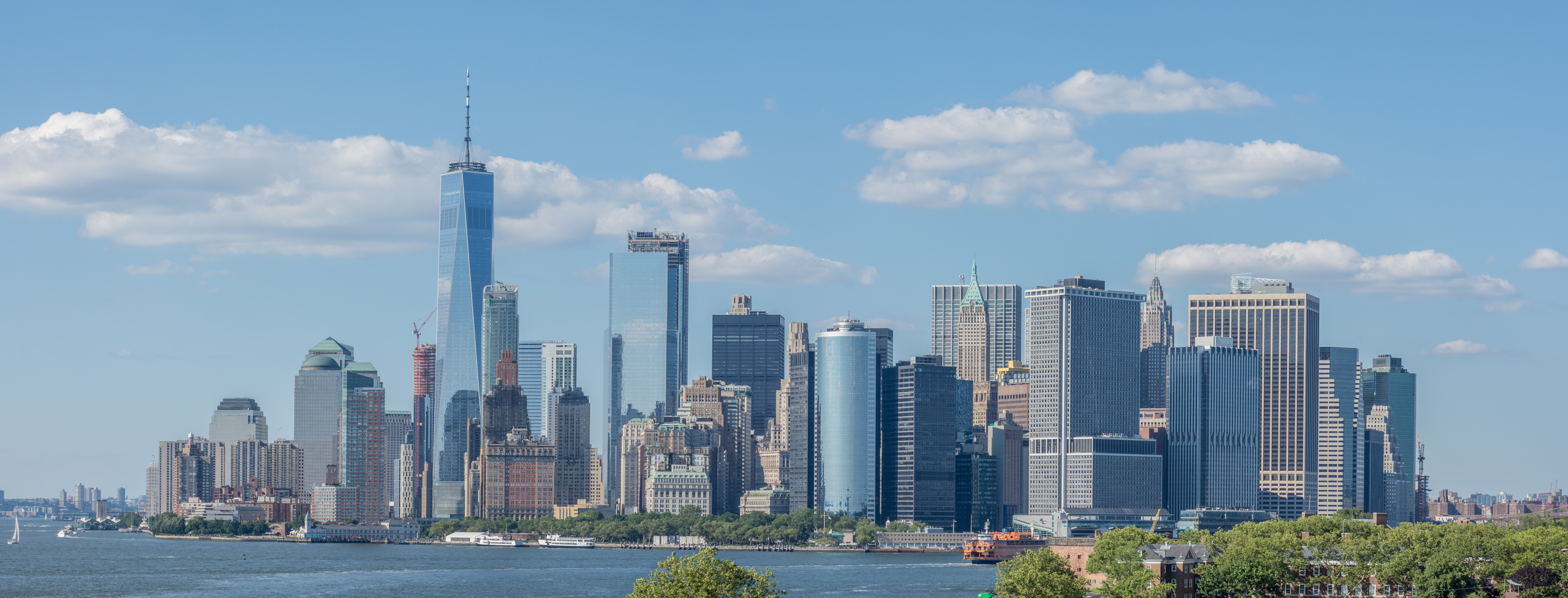
New York City is one of the exotic locations for the film.

In keeping with the franchise's penchant for filming in "exotic" locations, such as Abu Dhabi and Rio de Janeiro, it was announced in January 2016 that Universal was seeking approval from the United States and Cuban governments to shoot part of the film in Cuba. Principal photography began on March 14 in Mývatn, Iceland, where strong winds sent a plastic iceberg prop flying into a paddock. The prop struck two horses; one was wounded and the other mortally injured (it was later euthanized). In late April, filming began in Cuba's capital city, Havana. In May, filming also took place in Cleveland, once again standing in for Manhattan. Franchise cinematographer Stephen F. Windon returned for the eighth instalment. Filming also took place in Atlanta and New York City.

=== Music ===
Brian Tyler, who scored the third, fourth, fifth, and seventh installments, was tapped to compose the film score for the eighth picture. A soundtrack album by Atlantic Records was released on April 14, 2017, coinciding with the film's US theatrical release. The film's score album was released on April 28, by Back Lot Music.

== Release ==
=== Theatrical ===
The Fate of the Furious had its world premiere in Berlin on April 4, 2017. The film was theatrically released in the United States on April 14. The film was released in 1,074 IMAX screens around the world, making it the widest opening in IMAX history.

=== Home media ===
The Fate of the Furious was released on Ultra HD Blu-ray, Blu-ray and DVD on July 11, 2017, by Universal Pictures Home Entertainment.

== Reception ==
=== Box office ===
The Fate of the Furious grossed $226 million in the United States and Canada and $1.01 billion in other territories for a worldwide total of $1.236 billion, against a production budget of $250 million. It was the third-highest-grossing film of 2017 and the eleventh-highest-grossing film of all time. The film was released in 64 territories worldwide, including almost all major markets (minus Japan), starting from April 12, 2017, and was projected to earn anywhere between $375–440 million in its five-day opening weekend. By the end of the weekend, it ended up earning $539.9 million from nearly 23,000 screens, way above initial projections, to score the biggest global opening in cinematic history until it was surpassed by Avengers: Infinity War (2018). It also marked the third time that a film earned over $500 million in a single weekend, after Star Wars: The Force Awakens (2015) ($529 million) and Jurassic World (2015) ($525.5 million). On April 30, 2017, the film crossed the $1 billion mark, becoming the second film in the franchise to do so, after Furious 7. In IMAX, the film made $31.1 million from 1,079 screens to record the biggest IMAX April debut and the fourth-biggest overall at the time.

==== United States and Canada ====
Like several of its predecessors, The Fate of the Furious was released in the United States and Canada in the month of April, and like its immediate predecessor, occupied the lucrative Easter week holiday period slot, where it was expected to open with $100–125 million. It received the widest pre-summer release ever, at an estimated 4,304 venues, besting the 4,242 opening theater count of Batman v Superman: Dawn of Justice (2016) the previous March. The film made $10.4 million from Thursday night previews from 3,310 theaters, the second-highest of the franchise behind Furious 7's $15.8 million. On its opening day it grossed $45.6 million, with Thursday previews making up 22.8% of the amount, slightly better than the 23% for Furious 7. Earning a total of $98.8 million on its opening weekend, the film scored the second-biggest opening in the franchise (the third-biggest adjusted for inflation) and the third-biggest April debut, behind Furious 7 and The Jungle Book (2016). It posted an almost identical weekend multiplier like its immediate predecessor (2.166× vs 2.18×). Scott Mendelson of Forbes magazine compared the opening to how Spectre (2015) opening fell from Skyfall (2012). One notable record the film set was the best opening for a film with an African-American director, with Gray besting his own record set with Straight Outta Compton (2015).

==== Other territories ====
Internationally, The Fate of the Furious secured a release in 69 countries. The film was projected to post an opening between $275–330 million from over 20,000 screens, with some analysts believing it could go as high as $350–400 million. It opened Wednesday, April 12, 2017, in 8 countries, earning $17.9 million (including previews from 12 countries). It opened in 33 more countries on Thursday, April 2, for a total of 41 countries, earning $58.4 million, marking Universal Pictures overseas' highest-grossing Thursday ever, and for a two-day total of $82.2 million. It added 22 more countries on Friday, April 3, earning $112.1 million to score Universal International's highest-grossing Friday of all time, for a three-day total of $194.8 million. In total, through Sunday, the film registered an opening of $441.1 million from 64 markets, setting new records for the biggest April international debut, Universal's biggest, and the biggest of all time overall (ahead of Jurassic World)—It is the first such film to open past $400 million in a single weekend with a bulk of it coming from China. Around $22.6 million came from 681 IMAX screens which is Universal's second-biggest behind only Jurassic World. It topped the international charts for a second consecutive term, adding another $158.1 million after which it was surpassed by Guardians of the Galaxy Vol. 2 (2017), another film starring Diesel and Russell, in its third weekend. In IMAX, the film has grossed north of $58 million.

It set the record for the biggest opening day of 2017 in every territory it has been released at, the biggest opening day of all time in 16 markets, Universal's biggest opening day ever in 22 territories and the biggest opening in the franchise in 38 markets. Moreover, it recorded the biggest paid previews of all time in Malaysia, Singapore, Venezuela, and Vietnam. In terms of opening weekend, the film debuted at No. 1 in all markets where it set the biggest opening weekend of all time in 20 markets; Universal's biggest opening weekend ever in 28 markets; and the biggest opening in the franchise in 40 markets. The top openings were recorded in China ($192 million), Mexico ($17.7 million), the United Kingdom ($17.5 million), Russia ($14.2 million), Germany ($13.6 million), Brazil ($12.8 million), India ($17.4 million), Korea ($10.6 million), Middle East combined ($9.9 million), Taiwan ($9.3 million), France ($9.2 million), Australia ($9.5 million), Argentina ($9 million), Indonesia ($8.5 million), Italy ($6.7 million), Malaysia ($6.3 million), Spain ($6.1 million), Colombia ($4.9 million), Thailand ($4.9 million), Panama ($4.8 million), Pakistan ($2.5 million), and Romania ($1.7 million). Comparing market-to-market performance, Furious 7 had an opening worth $250 million without China and Russia while The Fate of the Furious delivered $228.2 million debut, sans the two aforementioned markets. In Japan, the film debuted with $7.5 million. Although that's a new record for the franchise, the film debuted at number three behind Disney's Beauty and the Beast (2017) and local film Detective Conan: Crimson Love Letter (2017)—their robust second-weekend earnings blocked the former from taking the top spot, making Japan one of the few markets where the film didn't open at No. 1. The biggest-earning markets are China ($392.8 million), followed by Brazil ($41.8 million), the United Kingdom ($37.5 million), Mexico ($36.8 million), and Germany ($32.4 million). In Peru, it has become Universal's highest-grossing film ever.

=== Critical response ===
The Fate of the Furious received mixed reviews from critics. On the review aggregator website Rotten Tomatoes it has an approval rating of 67% with an average score of 6.10/10, based on 310 reviews. The website's critical consensus reads, "The Fate of the Furious opens a new chapter in the franchise, fueled by the same infectious cast chemistry and over-the-top action fans have come to expect." Metacritic, which uses a weighted average, assigned the film a score of 56 out of 100 based on 45 critics, indicating "mixed or average reviews". Audiences polled by CinemaScore gave the film an average grade of "A" on an A+ to F scale, and those at PostTrak gave the film an 88% overall positive score and a 71% "definite recommend".

Mike Ryan of Uproxx gave the film a positive review, writing: "This isn't my favorite of the series—that's still Furious 7 (it's hard to top those jumps from skyscraper to skyscraper, but this is a worthy entry). These movies know what they are. These movies know they are fun. These are fun movies!" Owen Gleiberman of Variety, in his positive review of the film, wrote: "Most franchises, after eight films, are feeling a twinge of exhaustion, but this one has achieved a level of success—and perpetual kinetic creative energy—that's a testament to its commercial/cultural/demographic resonance." He also wrote, "If this series, over the last 16 years, has taught us anything, it's that just when you think it's about to run out of gas, it gets outfitted with an even more elaborate fuel-injection system."

David Ehrlich of IndieWire gave the film a C− and called it the worst entry of the franchise, saying: "As much a mess of conflicting tones and styles as it is of locations, this setpiece—like the rest of Gray's movie—feels like a heap of random parts that were thrown together in the hopes that fate might somehow weld them into a roadworthy vehicle. But it's not all groundbreaking." J. R. Kinnard of PopMatters magazine gave a lukewarm review, writing: "It's unlikely that devotees will consider The Fate of the Furious one of the stronger entries in the series. Still, the filmmakers and actors are clearly dedicated to making a quality product, avoiding the complacency that often plagues action sequels." Richard Roeper of the Chicago Sun-Times gave the film two stars out of four, saying: "Moments after Dom has gone rogue and apparently wants to kill them, they're making jokes. As they're racing through the streets of New York City or skidding along the ice in Russia, killing bad guys and narrowly avoiding getting killed themselves, they're crackin' wise. Even within this ludicrous universe, it's jarring to hear these supposedly smart folks, who refer to themselves as 'family,' acting like idiots who don't seem to care if they live or die, or if their friends survive."

Professor of international political economy Richard E. Feinberg has commented on the political significance of the film's opening setting of Havana in the context of shifting U.S.–Cuban relations, calling the eighth instalment, "Hollywood's love letter to Havana". He writes, "In the Cuban sequence's dramatic climax, Dom wins his hard-fought one-mile race ("a Cuban mile") against a tough local competitor, by a nose. The loser is gracious: 'You won my car and you earned my respect,' he admits to the FF hero. Dom's response is equally magnanimous: 'Keep your car, your respect is good enough for me.' In this instance, FF8 captures the essence of the relations between the United States and Cuba: it's all about mutual respect."

=== Accolades ===
Award	Date of ceremony	Category	Recipient(s)	Result	Ref.
2017	Teen Choice Awards	Choice Movie: Action	The Fate of the Furious	Nominated	
2017	Teen Choice Awards	Choice Movie Actor: Action	Vin Diesel	Nominated	
2017	Teen Choice Awards	Choice Movie Actor: Action	Dwayne Johnson	Nominated	
2017	Teen Choice Awards	Choice Movie Actress: Action	Michelle Rodriguez	Nominated	
2017	Teen Choice Awards	Choice Movie: Villain	Charlize Theron	Nominated	
2017	Teen Choice Awards	Choice Movie: Ship	Michelle Rodriguez and Vin Diesel	Nominated	
2018	Saturn Awards	Best Action or Adventure Film	The Fate of the Furious	Nominated	
2018	Saturn Awards	Best Editing	Christian Wagner and Paul Rubell	Nominated	

== Sequels and spin-offs ==
Following the positive reception of Johnson and Statham's chemistry in this film and the box-office success of this film, Universal released a spin-off, Hobbs & Shaw, in August 2019.

F9 was released in June 2021. It grossed over $700 million worldwide, and received a similarly mixed critical and audience response. A tenth film, Fast X, was released in May 2023. Although Fast X was reported as the final mainline installment of the franchise, an eleventh film, Fast Forever (2028), is in production.
