= Christian Wagner =

American film editor

- Born: U.S.
- Occupation: Film editor
- Spouse: Nicole Muirbrook (divorced)

Christian Wagner is an American film editor who has edited films such as Face/Off (1997) and Mission: Impossible 2 (2000). He is also known for collaborating numerous times with film director Tony Scott, from the films True Romance (1993) to Domino (2005). He also co-edited the fourth through eighth installments of The Fast and the Furious film series.

== Filmography ==
Year	Title	Director	Notes	Refs.
1985	Code of Silence	Andrew Davis	First Assistant editor	
1986	The Wraith	Mike Marvin	Assistant editor	
1987	The Bedroom Window	Curtis Hanson	First Assistant editor	
1987	Real Men	Dennis Feldman	Assistant editor	
1987	Weeds	John D. Hancock		
1988	Hero and the Terror	William Tannen		
1990	Revenge	Tony Scott	Associate editor	
1990	Days of Thunder	Tony Scott	First Assistant editor	
1991	The Last Boy Scout	Tony Scott	Additional editor	
1993	True Romance	Tony Scott		
1994	Chasers	Dennis Hopper		
1995	Bad Boys	Michael Bay		
1995	Fair Game	Andrew Sipes		
1996	The Fan	Tony Scott		
1997	Face/Off	John Woo		
1998	The Negotiator	F. Gary Gray		
2000	Mission: Impossible 2	John Woo	Nominated — Satellite Award for Best Editing	
2001	Spy Game	Tony Scott		
2002	Die Another Day	Lee Tamahori		
2004	Man on Fire	Tony Scott		
2005	The Amityville Horror	Andrew Douglas		
2005	The Island	Michael Bay		
2005	Domino	Tony Scott		
2007	Next	Lee Tamahori		
2008	Deception	Marcel Langenegger		
2008	The Fifth Commandment	Jesse V. Johnson		
2009	The Uninvited	The Guard Brothers		
2009	Fast & Furious	Justin Lin		
2009	Public Enemies	Michael Mann	Additional editor	
2011	Battle: Los Angeles	Jonathan Liebesman		
2011	Fast Five	Justin Lin	Nominated — Satellite Award for Best Editing	
2012	Total Recall	Len Wiseman		
2013	Fast & Furious 6	Justin Lin	Nominated — Satellite Award for Best Editing	
2015	Furious 7	James Wan	Nominated — Satellite Award for Best Editing	
2017	Kong: Skull Island	Jordan Vogt-Roberts	Additional editor	
2017	The Fate of the Furious	F. Gary Gray	Nominated — Satellite Award for Best Editing	
2018	The Spy Who Dumped Me	Susanna Fogel	Additional editor	
2019	Men in Black: International	F. Gary Gray		
2021	The Conjuring: The Devil Made Me Do It	Michael Chaves		
2021	The Suicide Squad	James Gunn		
2023	The Last Voyage of the Demeter	André Øvredal		
2025	Novocaine	Dan Berk and Robert Olsen		
