= The Turbo Charged Prelude for 2 Fast 2 Furious =

2003 American short film

- Directed by: Philip G. Atwell
- Written by: Keith Dinielli
- Produced by: Chris Palladino
- Starring: Paul Walker
- Production company: Geronimo Film Productions
- Distributed by: Universal Pictures Home Entertainment
- Release date: June 3, 2003
- Running time: 6 minutes
- Country: United States

The Turbo Charged Prelude for 2 Fast 2 Furious (also known simply as Turbo Charged Prelude (Note: Or The Turbo-Charged Prelude for 2 Fast 2 Furious (hyphenated), as given in the opening credit of the film.)) is a 2003 American short film directed by Philip G. Atwell and written by Keith Dinielli. It is the first short film in the Fast & Furious franchise and is a follow-up to The Fast and the Furious (2001) and prequel to 2 Fast 2 Furious (2003). It stars Paul Walker. In the film, Brian O'Conner (Walker) leaves Los Angeles and travels eastward across the U.S. Sun Belt to evade police capture after aiding and abetting Dominic Toretto's escape from the law in the first film.

Development for the film began after Vin Diesel, who starred in the original film, was confirmed not to appear in 2 Fast 2 Furious. The film includes footage from its predecessor (during which dialogues can be partially heard) but it features no original dialogue. Filming occurred in Los Angeles and Miami.

The film was first released by Universal Pictures Home Entertainment on June 3, 2003, having a limited theatrical release by Universal Pictures in the United States to tie with 2 Fast 2 Furious. It was later included on special edition home releases of the first film.

== Plot ==
Brian O'Conner packs his bags and leaves Los Angeles, before the LAPD gets a chance to arrest him for letting Dominic Toretto escape. (Note: As depicted at the ending of The Fast and the Furious (2001)) As the FBI launch a national manhunt, Brian travels across Arizona, New Mexico, and Texas in a 1991 Dodge Stealth, winning street races along the way for money.

Brian is forced to abandon his car at a motel in San Antonio when police officers are notified of his presence. While they collect the car, he manages to escape and hitches a ride from an unknown woman. She drops him off at a used car lot, with him realizing she knows that he is a wanted man. There, Brian buys a teal Nissan Skyline GT-R R34. Later, collecting more money from street races, and even helping the owner of the local car shop, Brian modifies his new car. Before Brian leaves, the shop owner hands him back his wad of cash and lets his customizations go as a free job, as a thank-you to Brian for his help. Brian heads back on the road traveling eastbound, winning more races. Brian continues across country until he reaches Miami, where he sees a modified Toyota Supra and Mazda RX-7.

== Cast ==
- Paul Walker as Brian O'Conner, an ex-LAPD officer, street racer and fugitive travelling across the United States on the run from the law.

The short film also features archival footage of Vin Diesel as Dominic Toretto from the first film, and Peter Aylward and Rodney Neil have cameo appearances as police officers. Minka Kelly acts as the woman who gave Brian a ride to San Antonio.

=== Content ===
The film is noted for containing "almost no dialogue".

== Reception ==
A review considered the film a "hidden gem" among other films of the franchise. It is also considered a necessary link for the understanding of various elements in the franchise.
