= 2 Fast 2 Furious =

2003 film by John Singleton

- Theatrical release poster
- Directed by: John Singleton
- Screenplay by: Michael Brandt; Derek Haas
- Story by: Michael Brandt; Derek Haas; Gary Scott Thompson
- Based on: Characters by Gary Scott Thompson
- Produced by: Neal H. Moritz
- Starring: Paul Walker; Tyrese Gibson (Note: Credited as "Tyrese" in the end credits of the film.); Eva Mendes; Cole Hauser; Chris "Ludacris" Bridges; James Remar
- Cinematography: Matthew F. Leonetti
- Edited by: Bruce Cannon; Dallas Puett
- Music by: David Arnold
- Production companies: Universal Pictures; Neal H. Moritz Productions
- Distributed by: Universal Pictures (North America); United International Pictures (International)
- Release dates: June 3, 2003 (Universal Amphitheatre); June 6, 2003 (United States)
- Running time: 107 minutes
- Country: United States
- Language: English
- Budget: $76 million
- Box office: $236 million

2 Fast 2 Furious is a 2003 American action film directed by John Singleton from a screenplay by Michael Brandt and Derek Haas, based on a story by Brandt, Haas, and Gary Scott Thompson. It is the sequel to The Fast and the Furious (2001) and the second installment in the Fast & Furious franchise, and stars Paul Walker as Brian O'Conner, alongside Tyrese Gibson, Eva Mendes, Cole Hauser, Chris "Ludacris" Bridges, and James Remar. In the film, O'Conner and Roman Pearce (Gibson) transport "dirty money" for shady Miami-based import-export dealer Carter Verone (Hauser), while secretly working with undercover agent Monica Fuentes (Mendes) to bring Verone down.

A second Fast & Furious film was planned after the box office success of its predecessor in 2001, and was confirmed with the returns of Walker and producer Neal H. Moritz. Vin Diesel and Rob Cohen, the co-star and director of the first film, were unable to return; Gibson and Singleton joined the cast in their absence in 2002. To canonically account for Diesel's departure, the short film The Turbo Charged Prelude for 2 Fast 2 Furious (2003) was produced and released. Principal photography for 2 Fast 2 Furious commenced in September 2002 and lasted until that December, with filming locations including Miami and the surrounding areas in southern Florida.

2 Fast 2 Furious premiered at Universal Amphitheatre in Los Angeles on June 3, 2003, and was released in the United States on June 6, by Universal Pictures. The film grossed $236 million worldwide and received generally negative reviews from critics, although its reception has improved over time. A third film with an unrelated story, titled The Fast and the Furious: Tokyo Drift, was released in 2006, and a sequel, Fast & Furious, was released in 2009.

== Plot ==
Ex-LAPD officer Brian O'Conner has escaped to Miami and is in hiding, after aiding wanted felon Dominic Toretto in Los Angeles escape from authorities. (Note: As depicted in The Fast and the Furious (2001) and its connected short film The Turbo Charged Prelude for 2 Fast 2 Furious (2003)) He makes a living by street racing, driving his 1999 Nissan R34 Skyline GT-R in events organized by his friend, mechanic Tej Parker. After a race with 3 other racers, including Suki, that involves jumping over an open bridge, they are ambushed by cops, and Brian is arrested. However, his former boss, FBI Special Agent Bilkins and Customs Enforcement Agent Markham offers a deal to clear his record in exchange for going undercover to help arrest drug lord Carter Verone. Brian agrees on the condition he choose his partner, deciding on his estranged childhood friend Roman Pearce. Initially, Roman distrusts Brian for being a cop and not preventing his own prior arrest, but nonetheless agrees to the same record-clearing deal.

Back in Miami, Customs Agent Monica Fuentes, who is undercover working for Verone, gets them an audience. Fuentes provides Brian and Roman two customized vehicles for the job – a Mitsubishi Lancer Evolution VII and a Mitsubishi Eclipse GTS Spyder. After a test in which Brian and Roman beat six other drivers to retrieve a package from Verone's car in an impound lot, they get a job to bring a package to Verone in the Florida Keys. During the test, Markham believes they are fleeing, and nearly compromises their cover by meeting them at the lot. Brian and Roman find out the two Mitsubishis are GPS-tagged vehicles, which allowed Markham to intercept them at the impound lot. To prevent Markham from undermining the next job, Brian and Roman acquire a 1969 Chevrolet Yenko Camaro SYC and 1970 Dodge Challenger R/T in a pink slip race from two of the drivers who lost Verone's test.

At a nightclub, Verone tortures corrupt MPD Detective Whitworth into giving the men a window to make their getaway. Verone then threatens Monica, whom he saw speaking affectionately to Brian earlier at the club. Brian and Roman revisit Tej and his crew, and they arrange a diversion during their drive to the Keys. One morning, Brian wakes up to find Monica in his house. She warns him that the drop will take place in an airfield and that Verone intends to kill them once it is complete. Enrique and Roberto arrive, looking for her, and a confrontation ensues before Verone arrives to defuse the situation, with Monica escaping beforehand. The duo later inform Markham and Bilkins about the plan, who suggests that they come up with a plan.

On the day of the job, Brian and Roman split the money between their cars and leave. Whitworth eventually sends in the Miami police department, and a chase ensues. The pair lead the police to a warehouse where a scramble organized by Tej causes chaos. Brian and Roman elude the police in the muscle cars, while Tej and Suki are detained driving the GPS-tagged Mitsubishis to lead the cops away. As Brian approaches the airfield, Enrique orders him to detour to a marina. At the same time, Roman ejects Roberto from his car with an improvised ejector seat using nitrous oxide. At the airfield, Customs surround the plane but realize they have been duped. At the marina, Verone reveals he was aware he was under surveillance and gave Monica false information. Verone orders Brian killed, and Monica onto his private yacht, intending to use her as leverage. Before Enrique can kill Brian, Roman arrives, and the pair incapacitate him. Verone flees aboard the yacht, but is intercepted when Brian drives the Yenko off of a ramp and crashes into the deck. Brian, Roman, and Monica incapacitate and subdue Verone.

Their deal upheld, Markham clears Brian and Roman's record, and Roman hands over Verone's cash. Brian and Roman agree to stay in Miami, and they decide to open a garage together, funded by a cut of the cash they secretly kept for themselves.

== Cast ==
- Paul Walker as Brian O'Conner: A former LAPD police officer who became a fugitive after letting Dominic Toretto escape in the previous film and has now settled in Miami. He drives a 1999 Nissan R34 Skyline GT-R and a 2002 Mitsubishi Lancer Evolution VII.
- Tyrese Gibson (credited as Tyrese) as Roman Pearce: Brian's childhood friend who is on house arrest after serving time in prison, for which he still blames Brian. He drives a 2003 Mitsubishi Eclipse GTS Spyder.
- Eva Mendes as Agent Monica Fuentes: A U.S. Customs agent working undercover as Carter Verone's aide and Brian's love interest.
- Cole Hauser as Carter Verone: A ruthless drug lord whose organization the Customs Service sent Monica and later Brian and Roman to infiltrate.
- Ludacris (credited as Chris "Ludacris" Bridges) as Tej Parker: A race host and a friend of Brian. He arranges high stakes street racing events.
- James Remar as Agent Markham: A U.S. customs agent in charge of the operation against Verone; Monica's superior.
- Devon Aoki as Suki: A friend of Brian, Tej, and Jimmy. She is the only named female racer in the movie, and her crew is made up entirely of women. She normally drives a hot pink custom Honda S2000.
- Thom Barry as Agent Bilkins: An FBI agent reprising his role from the first film. He acts as Brian's handler for his undercover operations.
- Edward Finlay as Agent Dunn: A U.S. Customs agent who is Markham's number two in the operation.
- Mark Boone Junior as Detective Whitworth: A Miami detective who is forced by Verone to give Pearce and O'Conner a window to deliver his package.
- Mo Gallini as Enrique: Verone's bald henchman.
- Roberto Sanchez as Roberto: Verone's henchman and Enrique's partner.
- MC Jin as Jimmy: A mechanic who works for Tej and is a close friend of Brian.
- Amaury Nolasco as Julius "Orange Julius": A street racer who drives an orange Mazda RX-7.
- Michael Ealy as Jack "Slap Jack": A street racer who drives a gold Toyota Supra.
- John Cenatiempo as Korpi: A street racer who drives a 1969 Chevrolet Camaro Yenko S/C.
- Eric Etebari as Darden: Korpi's friend who drives a 1970 Dodge Challenger.
- Neal H. Moritz as a Police Officer: The film's producer, Moritz makes a cameo appearance as a police officer during a chase scene.

== Production ==
=== Development ===
Because of the incredible response to The Fast and the Furious, we knew we had struck a chord with young audiences. I believe we had tapped into a culture—the very urban world of street racing. It really resonated with our fans, who continued to support the film when it hit the streets on DVD and video—I mean, it really just exploded again, allowing even more people a chance to take the ride. We knew they were ready for another film, but only if we delivered one with the same authenticity and edge as the first. Well, we've done just that.

— Producer Neal H. Moritz, on greenlighting the project sequel.

Plans to make a sequel came about after the box office success of The Fast and the Furious, which grossed over $200 million worldwide. John Singleton had seen the first film and was awed by it, saying: "When I saw The Fast and the Furious, I was like, 'Damn, why didn't I think of that?' Growing up in South Central L.A., we had street races all the time." Singleton's rave reaction of the film as well as the culture of street racing in general influenced his decision to direct the sequel. The director also claimed that the concept of street racing could be something young audiences can relate to.

The screenplay was written by Michael Brandt and Derek Haas, along with Gary Scott Thompson (the co-writer from the first film). There were two film treatments submitted early on, one of which did not involve Vin Diesel's character in the event the actor would not return for the sequel. Singleton credited Top Gun as a major influence for the film, particularly with regard to the action sequences.

=== Pre-production ===
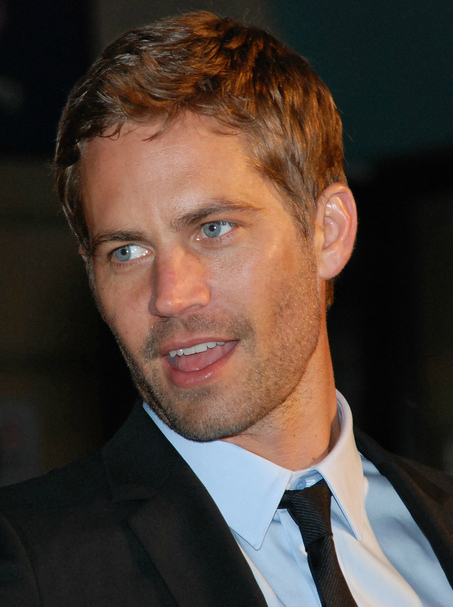
Paul Walker returned as Brian O'Conner in 2 Fast 2 Furious.

Instead of portraying Jim Street in S.W.A.T., Paul Walker would reprise his role as Brian O'Conner from the first film. Vin Diesel was offered $25 million to return in the sequel as Dominic Toretto. However, he refused after reading the screenplay as he felt that its potential was inferior compared to that of its predecessor; rather, he chose to appear in The Chronicles of Riddick instead. According to Variety magazine in 2015 he was less taken with what the screenwriters had in mind for the film, "They didn't take a Francis Ford Coppola approach to it. They approached it like they did sequels in the '80s and '90s, when they would drum up a new story unrelated for the most part, and slap the same name on it." However, Diesel reflected on his decision in a July 2014 report from Uproxx, saying: "I would've said, 'Don't walk away from it just because the script sucked in 2 Fast 2 Furious because there's an obligation to the audience to fight, no matter what, to make that film as good as possible.' ... I might have had a little bit more patience or belief in the long-term of it." Rob Cohen, who had just directed Diesel in XXX, said he would only take part in the sequel if Diesel was in it, so was no longer involved once Diesel dropped out.

Paul Walker, who had just finished Timeline at the time, reprised his role in the second picture as Brian O'Conner. Tyrese Gibson, then known mononymously as Tyrese, also became a part of the cast having previously acted in Singleton's Baby Boy, which was the singer's feature film acting debut; he portrayed Roman Pearce. Ja Rule, another prominent rap artist who appeared in The Fast and the Furious as Edwin, was originally tapped to reprise his role. Ja Rule was offered $500,000 for the role, which was more than what he had been paid to appear in The Fast and the Furious, $15,000. According to Singleton, "Ja got too big for himself. He turned it down. He turned down a half a million dollars. ... He was acting like he was too big to be in the sequel. He wouldn't return calls." Ja Rule later stated in an interview in 2021 that he was already obligated to go on tour at the time after Diesel and Cohen both declined to be in the movie. Ja Rule had to make the decision: to take the $500,000 for the second Fast and Furious film or $13 million to $14 million on tour.

The character of Tej Parker was then created, at first with Redman in mind, however, when Redman also had to drop out due to scheduling conflicts with his own show Method & Red, the director then hired Ludacris as a substitute. Bridges would later rise to prominence for appearing in the film and star in later films such as Crash and Hustle & Flow. Additional cast also included Cole Hauser as key villain Carter Verone, who appeared in Singleton's Higher Learning; Eva Mendes as undercover agent Monica Fuentes; and Devon Aoki as Suki, the sole female driver in the film.

=== Filming ===
Principal photography began in the fall of 2002, and Matthew F. Leonetti served as the director of photography. Filming was done mostly in various parts of South Florida such as Miami Beach, Seven Mile Bridge, and Homestead Air Reserve Base. Hauser's character's mansion was shot in Coral Gables, in a house owned by Sylvester Stallone. At Bill Baggs Cape Florida State Park, 2 Fast 2 Furious was filmed on one side, while Bad Boys II was filmed on the other side at the same time.

A car enthusiast himself, Walker drove a Nissan Skyline GT-R model R34 borrowed from the film's Technical Advisor, Craig Lieberman, in the film's opening scenes. Aoki did not have a driver's license or any driving experience prior to the film's production, and took driving lessons during filming; she drove a pink 2001 Honda S2000 AP1 in the film. Gibson drove a convertible Mitsubishi Eclipse GTS Spyder, while Michael Ealy drove a Toyota Supra Turbo MkIV model JZA80 that had been used by Walker in The Fast and the Furious.

=== Music ===
The musical score was composed by David Arnold. The soundtrack was released on May 27, 2003, on Def Jam Recordings, the same record label that Ludacris was signed to.

== Release ==
2 Fast 2 Furious premiered at the Universal Amphitheatre on June 3, 2003. The short film The Turbo Charged Prelude for 2 Fast 2 Furious was released before select screenings and on special edition home releases of the first film. It was then released to theaters in the United States on June 6, 2003.

=== Home media ===
2 Fast 2 Furious was released on DVD and VHS on September 30, 2003. It was later released on Blu-ray on March 24, 2009, and 4K Ultra-HD on October 2, 2018.

=== Video game ===
A mobile game was released in 2004 by Digital Bridges.

== Reception ==
=== Box office ===
2 Fast 2 Furious earned $19.6 million in its opening day at the box office, and grossed $52.1 million on its U.S. opening weekend in 3,408 theaters, ranking #1 above Finding Nemo. The film went on to score the fourth-highest June opening weekend, behind Batman Forever, Scooby-Doo and Austin Powers: The Spy Who Shagged Me. This was also one of three consecutive Universal films of 2003 to make an opening weekend above $50 million, with the others being Bruce Almighty and Hulk. Furthermore, the film surpassed Shaft to have the highest opening weekend for a John Singleton film and XXX to have the biggest opening weekend for a Neal H. Moritz film respectively. During its second weekend, it fell behind Finding Nemo, making $19.1 million.

Throughout its 133 days in release, 2 Fast 2 Furious reached a peak release of 3,418 theaters in the U.S. and earned $127.2 million domestically. Combined with the international gross of $109.2 million, the film earned over $236.4 million worldwide. It had the 15th largest US gross of 2003 and the 16th largest worldwide gross of 2003.

=== Critical response ===
On Rotten Tomatoes, 2 Fast 2 Furious has an approval rating of 37% based on 160 reviews and an average rating of 4.80/10. The site's critical consensus reads: "Beautiful people and beautiful cars in a movie that won't tax the brain cells." On Metacritic it has a weighted average score of 38 out of 100 based on reviews from 36 critics, indicating "generally unfavorable" reviews. Audiences surveyed by CinemaScore gave the film an average grade of "A−" on scale of A+ to F.

Todd McCarthy of Variety wrote: "While this John Singleton-directed sequel provides a breezy enough joyride, it lacks the unassuming freshness and appealing neighborhood feel of the economy-priced original." Scott Tobias of The A.V. Club wrote: "Singleton abandons the underground racing subculture that gave the first film its allure, relying instead on lazy thriller plotting that's only a bag of donuts and a freeze-frame away from the average TV cop show." USA Today's Mike Clark gave film 2 out of 4, and wrote "The movie is all about racing, and character be damned, though the still dazed-looking Walker and Tyrese finally get a little rapport going after a worn-out story's very rocky start." He concludes "Lack of pretension helps the viewer get over the fact that this is just another retread." Roger Ebert of the Chicago Sun-Times gave the film 3 out of 4 and said, "It doesn't have a brain in its head, but it's made with skill and style and, boy, it is fast and furious." Michael Agger of Slate Magazine stated that "2 Fast 2 Furious is just 2 lame, 2 tame, and 2 much like a video game." Stephen Hunter of The Washington Post described the film as "a kind of Miami Vice with many more carz and numberz where all the adjectives used 2 go." In 2018, Derek Lawrence of the Entertainment Weekly called it "the forgotten Fast and Furious gem" and praised the chemistry between Walker and Gibson and John Singleton's direction. In his Vulture piece, Bilge Eberi defends 2 Fast 2 Furious as an underrated entry in Singleton's career. Beneath its flashy exterior, the film is filled with simmering mistrust and personal grudges, turning typical action tropes into something more authentic. Eberi highlights moments of unexpected tenderness and camaraderie, like the playful joy during a car chase, showing Singleton's unique ability to add depth even to a seemingly second-rate action flick.

In 2014, John Singleton said: "It was awesome. The heads of the studio at the time were just like, just make it fun, make it cool, make it this gen." He also added, "I didn't do all that techno music that they did in the first movie. I used nothing but Southern Hip Hop which was like the rage at the time. I just funked it up, I made it more multi-ethnic." He also reflected on Paul Walker's role: "Paul [Walker] is going to be edgy. He's going to be more like a bad boy. That was the film where he was the star." On the experience itself, Singleton said, "It was a real fun experience. I got a chance to spend a year in Miami working on a multi-million dollar movie."

=== Accolades ===
Award	Category	Nominee	Result
MTV Movie Award	Breakthrough Male	Ludacris	Nominated
Golden Raspberry Awards	Worst Remake or Sequel	2 Fast 2 Furious	Nominated
Golden Raspberry Awards	Worst Excuse for an Actual Movie (All Concept/No Content)	2 Fast 2 Furious	Nominated
Teen Choice Awards	Choice Breakout Movie Actor	Michael Ealy	Nominated
Teen Choice Awards	Choice Movie Chemistry	Paul Walker	Won
Teen Choice Awards	Choice Movie Fight/Action Sequence	Paul Walker vs. Tyrese Gibson	Won
Teen Choice Awards	Choice Summer Movie	2 Fast 2 Furious	Nominated

== Sequels ==
After failing to secure the returns of Diesel, Walker, or any other member of the original cast, Universal ordered a sequel, The Fast and the Furious: Tokyo Drift (2006). Moritz returned and hired director Justin Lin, who directed several subsequent installments in the series.

Walker would reprise his role in Fast & Furious (2009), a direct sequel to the first two films.
