= Fast & Furious 6 =

2013 film by Justin Lin

- Theatrical release poster
- Directed by: Justin Lin
- Written by: Chris Morgan
- Based on: Characters by Gary Scott Thompson
- Produced by: Neal H. Moritz; Vin Diesel; Clayton Townsend
- Starring: Vin Diesel; Paul Walker; Dwayne Johnson; Michelle Rodriguez; Jordana Brewster; Tyrese Gibson; Chris "Ludacris" Bridges; Sung Kang; Luke Evans; Gina Carano; John Ortiz
- Cinematography: Stephen F. Windon
- Edited by: Christian Wagner; Kelly Matsumoto; Dylan Highsmith
- Music by: Lucas Vidal
- Production companies: Universal Pictures; Relativity Media; Original Film; One Race Films
- Distributed by: Universal Pictures
- Release dates: May 7, 2013 (Empire, Leicester Square); May 24, 2013 (United States)
- Running time: 130 minutes
- Country: United States
- Language: English
- Budget: $160–260 million
- Box office: $788.7 million

Fast & Furious 6 (titled onscreen as Furious 6) is a 2013 American action film directed by Justin Lin and written by Chris Morgan. It is the sequel to Fast Five (2011) and the sixth installment in the Fast & Furious franchise. The film stars Vin Diesel as Dominic Toretto and Paul Walker as Brian O'Conner, alongside Dwayne Johnson, Michelle Rodriguez, Jordana Brewster, Tyrese Gibson, Chris "Ludacris" Bridges, Sung Kang, Luke Evans, Gina Carano, and John Ortiz. In the film, Dom, Brian and their team are offered pardons for their crimes in exchange for helping DSS agent Luke Hobbs apprehend Owen Shaw (Evans), an ex-British SAS Major, who runs a mercenary organization in which Dom's former lover Letty is also a member.

A sixth film was planned as early as February 2010, prior to the production of Fast Five; this was confirmed in April 2011, after Morgan began writing the screenplay, while the returns of Diesel, Lin, and producer Neal H. Moritz were confirmed that June. Discussions arose filming alongside a potential seventh installment; these were abandoned once principal photography began in July 2012, which lasted until that December, with filming locations including Los Angeles, London, Glasgow, and the Canary Islands. Similarly to its predecessor, Fast & Furious 6 featured mostly practical stuntwork, which required designed specialty vehicles in order to be completed. Brian Tyler, the composer of the previous three installments, did not return due to scheduling conflicts and was replaced with Lucas Vidal.

Fast & Furious 6 premiered at Empire, Leicester Square on May 7, 2013, and was then first released in the United Kingdom on May 17, and in the United States on May 24, by Universal Pictures. The film received generally positive reviews from critics with praise for its direction, cast performances and action sequences. It grossed $788.7 million, making it the sixth-highest-grossing film of 2013, the then-third highest-grossing film distributed by Universal, and the then-highest-grossing film in the franchise. It was followed by Furious 7 in 2015.

Fast and Furious 6 is the last film in the series to be released in Paul Walker's lifetime as he died in a car crash on November 30, 2013, six months after the release of the film.

== Plot ==
Following their successful heist in Brazil, (Note: As depicted in Fast Five (2011).) Dominic Toretto lives with Elena Neves; his sister Mia lives with Brian O'Conner and their son, Jack; Gisele Yashar and Han Lue are together; and Roman Pearce and Tej Parker live in luxury.

DSS agents Luke Hobbs and Riley Hicks investigate the destruction of a Russian military convoy by a crew of mercenaries led by former British SAS operative, Owen Shaw. Hobbs convinces Dom to help capture Owen by showing him a photo of his supposedly murdered girlfriend, Letty Ortiz, who is working with Owen. Owen is stealing parts to create an electromagnetic pulse weapon called "Nightshade", intending to sell it to the highest bidder. Dom and his crew accept the mission in exchange for pardons.

In London, Owen's crew performs a heist at an Interpol building. Owen flees in a custom car, with Dom's crew in pursuit. Letty helps Owen, shooting at Dom. She is revealed to be amnesiac from her accident. Dom's crew learns that Owen is connected to Arturo Braga, a drug lord they had imprisoned. (Note: As depicted in Fast & Furious (2009).) Brian returns to Los Angeles as a prisoner to question Braga, who reveals that Owen helped him build his drug cartel. After Letty survived the explosion, Owen took her in when he learned she had amnesia.

With help from the FBI, Brian is released from prison and regroups with the team in London. Dom challenges Letty in a street racing competition; afterward, he returns her cross necklace, but she stays with Owen. Tej tracks Owen's next attack on a Spanish NATO base. Owen's crew assaults a highway military convoy carrying the computer chip to complete Nightshade. Dom's crew interferes; Brian and Roman flip Owen's tank, resulting in Letty being thrown from the vehicle; Dom saves her. Owen and his crew are captured. However, Mia has been kidnapped by Owen's henchmen. Hobbs is forced to release Owen, and Riley joins Owen after betraying Hobbs and Dom's crew. Letty stays with Dom.

Owen's crew boards a moving Antonov An-124, where Brian rescues Mia. The plane attempts to take off but is held down by excess weight as Dom's team tethers the plane to their vehicles. (Note: A topic of discussion among critics of the film is the length of the runway at the NATO base for the sequence to take place as it does: calculations suggest that it must be at least 18.37 miles (29.56 km) long, with some estimates going up to as much as 28.83 miles (46.40 km). For a point of comparison, the world's longest paved runway at the time was China's Qamdo Bamda Airport at 3.42 miles (5.50 km).) Gisele seemingly dies after saving Han, and Letty kills Riley. As the plane crashes, Owen is heavily injured; Dom saves himself by driving a Charger out of the flaming wreck. He gives the computer chip to Hobbs to secure their pardons, and he and the team return to his old family home in Los Angeles. Elena, now working with Hobbs, accepts that Dom loves Letty, and leaves.

In a mid-credits scene, Han is in a car chase in Tokyo when he is suddenly broadsided by an oncoming Mercedes-Benz W140. (Note: As depicted in The Fast and the Furious: Tokyo Drift (2006).) The driver (Note: Identified offscreen as Deckard Shaw.) leaves Letty's cross necklace by the crash and calls Dom, saying: "You don't know me, but you're about to", as Han's car explodes.

== Cast ==
- Vin Diesel as Dominic Toretto: A former criminal and professional street racer who has retired after their successful heist of $100 million with his crew in Brazil, and is now staying with Elena.
- Paul Walker as Brian O'Conner: A former LAPD police officer and FBI agent turned criminal who has retired and settled down with his girlfriend, Mia, and their son, Jack.
- Dwayne Johnson as Luke Hobbs: A DSS agent who allies with Dom following his last encounter with Dom and his team in Rio de Janeiro.
- Michelle Rodriguez as Letty Ortiz: Dom's girlfriend who has suffered from amnesia and was presumed dead in Fast & Furious (2009) following an undercover assignment as Brian's informant.
- Jordana Brewster as Mia Toretto: Dom's sister, a former member of his team, and Brian's girlfriend and mother of his child.
- Tyrese Gibson as Roman Pearce: A former criminal from Barstow and Brian's childhood friend, as well as a member of Dom's team.
- Ludacris (credited as Chris "Ludacris" Bridges) as Tej Parker: An ex-street racer and mechanic, as well as Brian and Roman's friend who was introduced in Miami, also a member of Dom's team.
- Sung Kang as Han Seoul-Oh, pseudonym of Han Lue: A professional street racer and Dom's former business partner in the Dominican Republic, also a member of his team. He is in a relationship with Gisele. (Note: Both Sung Kang and Justin Lin have stated the surname "Seoul-Oh" that Han uses in Fast & Furious 6 and Furious 7 is a fake ID, a play on the name "Han Solo".)
- Gal Gadot as Gisele Yashar: A former Mossad agent who previously worked as a liaison for Braga and aided Dom and Brian in capturing him by revealing his hideout in Mexico. She has since become one of the members on Dom's team. She is in a relationship with Han.
- Luke Evans as Owen Shaw: A former British SAS major who leads a group of skilled mercenaries to steal high-tech devices worth billions on the black market. He hijacks a military convoy, which brings him into conflict with Dom.
- Gina Carano as Riley Hicks: A DSS agent who is Hobbs's partner in his attempts to take down Shaw.
- Elsa Pataky as Elena Neves: A former Rio police officer who is in a relationship with Dom.

In addition, John Ortiz and Shea Whigham reprise their respective roles as Arturo Braga and Agent Michael Stasiak from Fast & Furious. Laz Alonso also makes an uncredited cameo in a flashback as Fenix Calderon, who was killed in Fast & Furious. Shaw's team members are played by Clara Paget as Vegh, Kim Kold as Klaus, Joe Taslim as Jah, David Ajala as Ivory, Samuel Stewart as Denlinger, Thure Lindhardt as Firuz, and Benjamin Davies as Adolfson. Jason Statham has an uncredited cameo as Deckard Shaw in the mid-credits scene ahead of Furious 7 (2015), as does singer Rita Ora playing a race starter in London.

== Production ==
=== Development ===
In February 2010, Diesel confirmed that production of Fast Five (2011) was commencing and also announced that a sixth installment was being planned. In January 2011, producer Neal H. Moritz said more:

In Vin's and my mind we already know what the sixth movie is, we've already been talking about it. Vin and I have had numerous conversations about what that might be. And we're starting to get serious about it right now. We just finished [Fast Five] like 4 or 5 weeks ago and we just needed a break, and now we're gonna start focusing on that.

In April 2011 it was confirmed that Chris Morgan had already begun work on a script for a potential sixth film at the behest of Universal Studios. It was also confirmed that Universal intended to transform the series from street-racing action into a series of heist films with car chases in the vein of The Italian Job (1969) and The French Connection (1971), with Fast Five as the transitional movie. Universal chairman Adam Fogelson said:

The question putting Fast Five and Fast Six together for us was: Can we take it out of being a pure car culture movie and into being a true action franchise in the spirit of those great heist films made 10 or 15 years ago?

Fogelson said that the racing aspect had put a "ceiling" on the number of people willing to see films in the series, and that, by turning it into a series where car driving ability is just one aspect of the film, he hoped to increase the series' audience. On Johnson's character, Fogelson added "[Johnson] also wants to appear in and be integral to the action in Fast Six."

On June 24, 2011, Universal Pictures announced that the anticipated sequel was scheduled for release on May 24, 2013. Moritz and Diesel returned as producers and Lin returned to direct. In an interview with Boxoffice, Lin revealed that he had, after discussions with Diesel, storyboarded, previsualized and edited a twelve-minute finale for Fast Six before filming was completed on Fast Five. Lin said he shot the footage as he was unsure at the time if there would be a sequel or if he would be able to direct it, but he wanted to have input on how any sequel would end. On October 21, 2011, the Los Angeles Times reported that Universal was considering filming two sequels—Fast Six and Fast Seven—back to back with a single story running through both films; both written by Morgan and directed by Lin. On December 20, 2011, Diesel stated that Fast Six would be split into two parts, with writing for the two films occurring simultaneously. On the decision, Diesel said:

We have to pay off this story, we have to service all of these character relationships, and when we started mapping all that out it just went beyond 110 pages ... The studio said, 'You can't fit all that story in one damn movie!'

On April 23, 2012, it was announced that mixed martial arts fighter Gina Carano was in negotiations to play a member of Hobbs's team. On May 1, 2012, Michelle Rodriguez was confirmed to be reprising her role as Letty Ortiz, and it was announced that Welsh actor Luke Evans had been offered a role as a villain. Evans was confirmed to join the cast on May 9, 2012, portraying the leader of a heist gang. Jason Statham was offered a villain role in the film, but he declined as he felt it wasn't right for him. On July 27, 2012, Joe Taslim was confirmed to appear as a villain, Jah. On February 15, 2012, Johnson confirmed that Fast Six would begin filming in May 2012, with some of the production to take place in the United Kingdom and Germany. Johnson stated that the two intended sequels would no longer be filmed simultaneously because of weather issues in filming locations, and that production on Fast Seven would only begin after the completion of Fast Six. However, filming did not officially begin until July 30, 2012. In February 2013, it was confirmed that the film would be titled Fast & Furious 6.

=== Principal photography ===
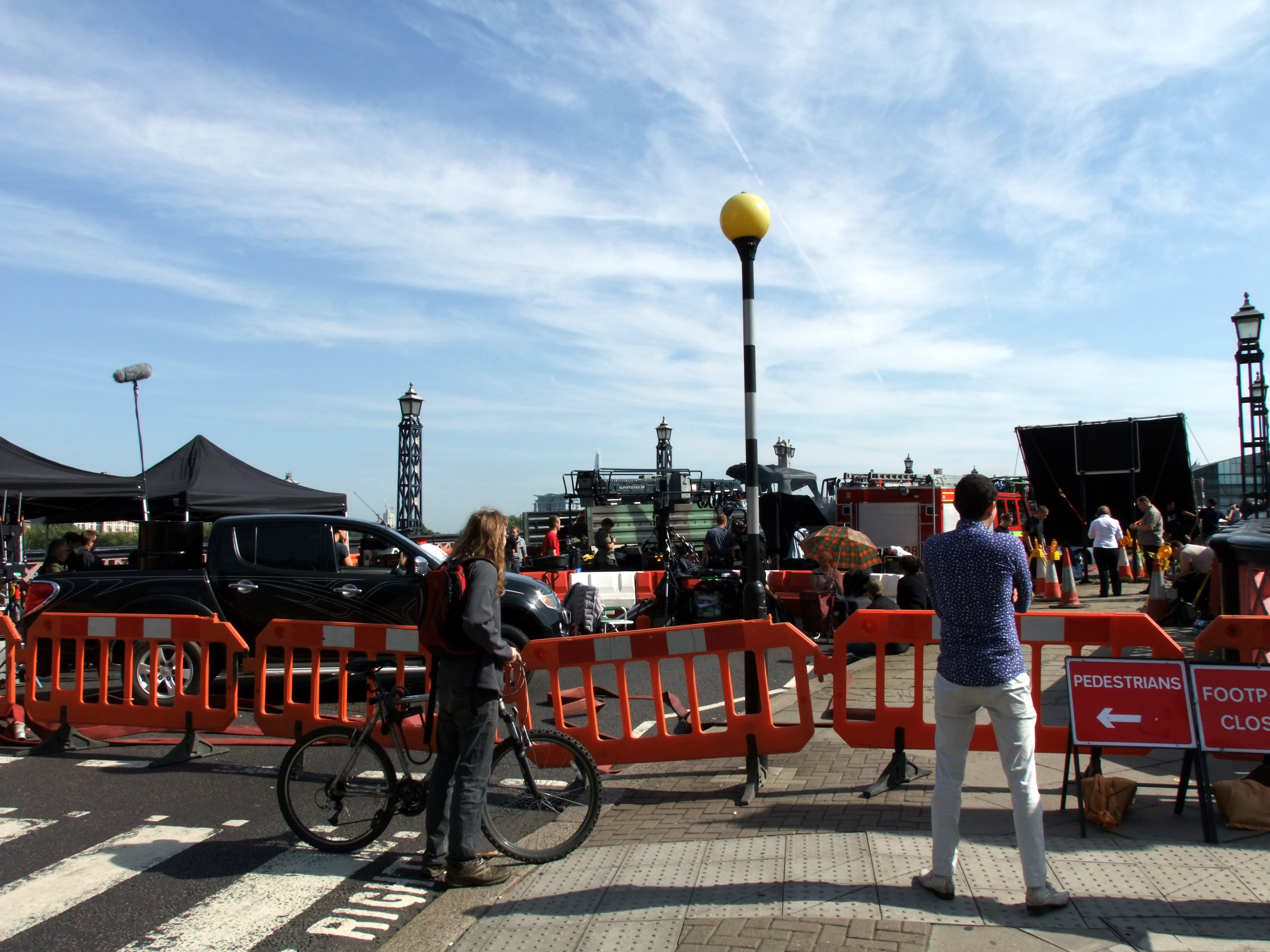
Filming of a scene set in Moscow underway on Lambeth Bridge in London, England in September 2012

Filming began on July 30, 2012, in London, England, and Shepperton Studios in Surrey. While Fast & Furious 6 became only the third production to be allowed to film in Piccadilly Circus (a scene involving Diesel and Rodriguez drag racing), Lin was unable to obtain permission to shoot an elaborate action sequence there involving an exploding oil tanker, and so a replica of the landmark was built at Shepperton. The production were given only two minutes every hour to shut down the area for filming. Stunt and car chase scenes began filming on location in Glasgow, Scotland on August 29, 2012, and were scheduled to conclude on September 16, 2012. The shoot took place entirely at night and involved approximately 250 crew, but none of the central cast. Sets were built on site for the scenes including a large car showroom. Filming was scheduled to take place at the former Royal Air Force base RAF Bentwaters in late August 2012 until early September 2012.

Shooting also occurred on Spain's Canary Islands including the island of Tenerife and Gran Canaria. Filming had been intended to take place in Marseille, France, but was relocated to the islands to take advantage of a larger tax rebate (38%) that was estimated to lower filming costs by $20 million.

On October 11, 2012, Walker suffered an ACL injury during a stunt, forcing the production to film around his scenes until he recovered. A scene involving a plane crash began filming at the former RAF station RAF Bovingdon, Hertfordshire, on October 30, 2012, and was scheduled to conclude on November 9. Filming for a car chase scene took place on Dale Street in Liverpool City Centre, and also the Queensway Tunnel over four days in November 2012. Two days of filming were spent at HM Treasury's Government Offices Great George Street, which served as a nightclub.

The final phase of filming took place in Echo Park, Los Angeles, beginning on December 1, 2012. The shoot returned the series to the filming location of the original The Fast and the Furious (2001), and required the garage setting of that film to be rebuilt by carpenters. By December 17, 2012, it was reported that filming had concluded. Post-production was heavily condensed; by March 2013, Lin was attempting to complete approximately 18 months' worth of post-production in a 12-week period. Lin was aided by five film editors; specialist teams focused on visual effects and color timing, and sound mixers that required two movie-theater-sized stages alone.

=== Stunts ===
For Owen Shaw's Flip Car, Lin tasked the film's vehicle designer with developing a car capable of driving head first into moving vehicles and flipping them into the air. McCarthy and his team designed a fully functional, low to the ground, formula racing car with a ramp on its front that allowed it to catapult other cars into the air while keeping the Flip Car driver safe.

For Rodriguez's and Carano's fight in the London Underground, producers refused to let the pair attempt a stunt where their characters battle over a stair rail and fall down a stairwell, fearing a serious injury would derail filming; stunt women performed the practical stunt. Morgan's scripted rendition of the fight was described as a catfight on steroids, but Rodriguez provided input to turn it into more of a street fight. Rodriguez said: "Originally in the script, it was a lot more 'Terminator'-esque—too far-fetched to be believed... Things just happened so quick and then I'm on top? Justin and I had to bust our booties to get it more realistic. I was like, 'This [woman] needs to kick my ass!'" Rodriguez and Carano rehearsed their fight choreography over two months, with trained fighter Carano undergoing extra practice to ensure her strikes looked credible without hitting hard enough to harm Rodriguez. Under the direction of fight choreographer Olivier Schneider, the fight was designed to be brutal but realistic, representing Carano's "cop with fight training" and Rodriguez's street fighting.

The parkade explosion Shaw lures Dom's team into combined on-set pillars that could be detonated alongside dust mines which could be used as a reference for the digital artists to create the appearance of the structure sinking into itself. A scene involving Evans' character commandeering a tank was originally intended to use CGI to portray the vehicle crushing cars along a Spanish highway, but the final scene used practical effects as the tank really ran over approximately 250 cars during filming. The scene was shot over a three-mile stretch of highway in Tenerife lined with holiday resorts that had to be digitally removed to create a desolate appearance. The segment's finale that sees Roman leap to a nearby car and the tank flip was created digitally.

The scene featuring Diesel smashing his car through the nose of a Soviet-era cargo aircraft during takeoff was conceived by Lin while producing Fast & Furious in 2009. At the time, the stunt was too expensive to film and did not fit into that film's story, but Lin commissioned digital pre-visualization artists to develop a mock-up of the idea. He attempted to revive the concept for Fast Five but the technology available proved insufficient and it still did not organically fit into the story. Filming the climactic scene practically was considered unfeasible as it involved throwing tanks through the air and having cars race alongside the moving aeroplane at 100 miles per hour. Lin opted to build various plane sets instead: a thirty foot high, seventy five foot long, fifty foot wide replica of the fuselage complete with wheels; the tail of the plane with a ramp allowing the cars to drive in and out; and a full scale build of the central fuselage, with wings, engines and the nose, that could be set on fire. For Dom's car to explode through the plane's nose, a Dodge Charger was placed on a pneumatic cannon mounted inside a ramp which was then towed by a 4×4 truck, all concealed behind the plane's nose replica. This was then clad in material soaked in flammable materials. The cannon fired the Charger through the nose as the material is ignited for the practical effect. The stunt driver had a burning 40-ton plane rig chasing them down the runway afterwards. The scene involved more than 200 crew members, and over 350 visual effects (VFX) artists at VFX studio Double Negative to complete. A typical shot of the craft's destruction could take over 100 man-days to complete. The VFX team combined the filmed explosions and smoke with digital augmentations to place the plane into the scene.

=== Music ===
Lucas Vidal composed the musical score for Fast & Furious 6. In addition to Vidal's score, tracks by composer Brian Tyler from the franchise's previous installments are also featured in the film. A soundtrack album to the film was released by Def Jam Recordings on May 21, 2013. It features many electronic and hip hop tracks, including songs by Deadmau5, Ludacris (who played Tej Parker), and many others.

== Marketing ==
The Fast & Furious series marketing attempted to cultivate an online fan base which was also considered to have helped promote the film; the filmmakers responded to fan interaction, conducted an online poll to decide the title of Fast & Furious 6, brought back the character of Letty Ortiz based on fan feedback and encouraged fans to document the film's production with unofficial photos. Universal marketing co-president Michael Moses said: "We're trying to remove the studio filter as much as possible, which is a little scary because you're ceding control... But it makes for more authentic and organic interaction with fans." A 15-piece clothing line was also produced in partnership with Guess, including T-shirts, jackets, caps, and watches.

Continuing their partnership from Fast Five, the Facebook game Car Town by Cie Games and the theater chain Regal Entertainment Group (REG) collaborated with Universal in a cross-media marketing promotion. Car Town allowed players to view the trailer for the film in an REG-branded, in-game drive-in theater. The game also featured missions and locations based on the plot of the film, and allowed players to join forces with Fast & Furious 6 characters. REG offered players of Car Town the ability to purchase tickets in-game via Fandango for films at REG theaters. By buying these tickets in-game, players were given promotional codes which in turn allowed them to unlock a virtual 2013 Dodge Charger SRT8.

== Release ==
The premiere of Fast & Furious 6 took place on May 7, 2013, at the Empire, Leicester Square in London. The film was released in the United Kingdom on May 17, 2013, with the North American release on May 24. It was titled onscreen as Furious 6.

=== Home media ===
Fast & Furious 6 DVD was released in the United Kingdom on September 16, 2013, and in Australia on October 3, 2013. In other countries Fast & Furious 6 DVD release has been confirmed for December 10, 2013. FX purchased the rights to air the movie on its network in 2015. Following Walker's death on November 30, 2013, Universal announced that a portion of the profits from the film's North American sales would be donated to Walker's charity Reach Out WorldWide. Various extended editions exist.

== Reception ==
=== Box office ===
Fast & Furious 6 earned $239 million in North America and $550 million elsewhere for a worldwide total of $789 million. Deadline Hollywood calculated the net profit of the film to be $131.5 million, when factoring together all expenses and revenues, making it the sixth-most-profitable release of 2013. Worldwide, it is the sixth-highest-grossing film of 2013 and the fourth-highest-grossing Universal film. On the weekend of June 14–16, 2013, it became the highest-grossing film in the Fast & Furious franchise worldwide, until it was surpassed by Furious 7 and The Fate of the Furious (2017).

Outside North America, it is the highest-grossing film in the Fast & Furious franchise, the second-highest-grossing Universal film, and the second-highest-grossing film of 2013. In the United Kingdom, the film took $4.4 million during its opening day from 462 screens, the biggest opening day for both Fast and Furious franchise and Universal in that market, the second-highest opening of 2013 behind Iron Man 3 ($4.7 million), and the number 1 film of the day with 54% of the market. It finished as the number-one film of the weekend, taking a total of $13.8 million; this figure made it the biggest opening for the franchise, Universal, a Vin Diesel or Dwayne Johnson film, and the second-biggest opening of 2013 again behind Iron Man 3 ($17.6 million). The film opened in fifty-nine territories the following weekend alongside the North American opening, placing as the number-one film in each and earning $160.3 million; it set opening-weekend records in the United Arab Emirates, the Middle East, and Argentina (the latter was first surpassed by Monsters University (2013)). In China, the Fast & Furious 6 opened to $6.9 million, making it Universal's highest-grossing film in the territory. It earned its 66th number-one opening, earning $23.6 million during its opening weekend, $3 million of which came from IMAX screenings.

In North America, Fast & Furious 6 debuted simultaneously with the comedy The Hangover Part III (2013) and the animated feature Epic (2013). It opened for midnight showings on May 23, 2013, in 2,409 theaters. It took $6.5 million, nearly doubling Fast Five's midnight gross ($3.8 million) which faced less direct competition. On its opening day, Fast & Furious 6 earned $38.7 million (including midnight earnings) from 3,659 theaters. The film finished the 4-day Memorial Day weekend in first place, taking $117.0 million, which was the fourth-highest 4-day Memorial Day opening behind Pirates of the Caribbean: At World's End (2007), Indiana Jones and the Kingdom of the Crystal Skull (2008) and X-Men: The Last Stand (2006). The audience was diverse, with Latinos representing 32%, women 49%, and 57% over the age of 25.

=== Critical response ===
On Rotten Tomatoes, Fast & Furious 6 holds an approval rating of 71% with an average rating of 6.2/10, based on 214 reviews. The site's critical consensus reads, "With high-octane humor and terrific action scenes, Fast & Furious 6 builds upon the winning blockbuster formula that made Fast 5 a critical and commercial success." On Metacritic, the film has a weighted average score of 61 out of 100, based on 39 critics, indicating "generally favorable" reviews. Audiences polled by CinemaScore gave the film an average grade of "A" on an A+ to F scale.

Fast & Furious 6 was generally considered to effectively mix absurd action scenes and outrageous stunts with a predictable but enjoyable plot and character dialog. IGN's Jim Vejvoda said that the film is a crowd pleaser whose fun moments outweighed failed attempts at humor and unintentionally comical dialog. Other reviewers highlighted the likable cast, ludicrous action, playful approach to the plot, and ability to immerse the audience in the high speed chases and conflict between the two opposing gangs. Digital Spy's Ben Rawson-Jones said the tone successfully mixed self-conscious spectacle with the central characters' teamwork, bonding and familial spirit. Conversely, Slant Magazine's Chris Cabin said the film was smug, cynical and insubstantial that delivered overly sentimental drama and forced comedy that seemed unaware "of how dumb the material is". The Daily Telegraph's Tim Robey labeled the film as slow-witted with a random and generic plot, and Time Out London's Derek Adams said the film featured puerile dialog, daft performances and flat comic repartee. IndieWire said that the film forsakes realistic set-pieces (comparing it to The Avengers (2012)), which undermined any attempts at creating tension.

Empire's Owen Williams noted that Fast & Furious 6 lacked the same surprise as Fast Five without Johnson's antagonist Hobbs, and suggested that the large cast of returning characters had made Evans' Owen Shaw unable to make an impression as the new villain. Scenes of dialog and character progression were criticized as slow, and laughably bad. Evans' Owen Shaw was repeatedly singled out as a refreshing and charismatic addition to the cast, though others described the character as generic and dull.

Lin's direction of the action set-pieces was described as lavish and exquisite. The cinematography received a mixed response. Variety's Scott Foundas appreciated the attention to spatial geography and complicated, single, continuous shots which were compared to the best of James Bond and Mission: Impossible films, and Rawson-Jones said that the nocturnal races in London made excellent use of the environment. The Hollywood Reporter's Todd McCarthy considered that the action scenes were cut too fast, failed to provide a sense of speed for the vehicles and were mired by poor angles and nocturnal settings that obscured the view. View London's Matthew Turner considered that the action lacked imagination, with the London-based segments amounting to little more than a geographically inaccurate race past landmarks.

In 2025, The Hollywood Reporter listed Fast & Furious 6 as having the best stunts of 2013.

=== Accolades ===
Year	Award	Category	Recipient	Result
2013
2013	Golden Trailer Awards	Best Action TV Spot	Breathe (Super Bowl Trailer)	Won
2013	Golden Trailer Awards	Best Summer Blockbuster 2013 TV Spot	Breathe (Super Bowl Trailer)	Won
2013	Golden Trailer Awards	Summer 2013 Blockbuster Trailer		Nominated
2013	Golden Trailer Awards	Best Sound Editing		Nominated
2013	Golden Trailer Awards	Best Teaser Poster		Nominated
2013	Teen Choice Awards	Choice Summer Movie: Action/Adventure		Won
2013	Teen Choice Awards	Choice Summer Movie Star: Male	Dwayne Johnson	Nominated
2013	Teen Choice Awards	Choice Summer Movie Star: Female	Michelle Rodriguez	Nominated
2013	Teen Choice Awards	Choice Movie: Chemistry	Vin Diesel, Dwayne Johnson, & Paul Walker	Nominated
2013	Hollywood Film Festival	Best Film		Nominated
2013	Phoenix Film Critics Society Award	Best Stunts		Won
2014
2014	People's Choice Awards	Favorite Movie		Nominated
2014	People's Choice Awards	Favorite Action Movie		Nominated
2014	People's Choice Awards	Favorite Action Movie Star	Vin Diesel	Nominated
2014	IGN's Best of 2013 Movie Awards	Best Action Movie		Won
2014	Screen Actors Guild Awards	Outstanding Performance by a Stunt Ensemble in a Motion Picture		Nominated
2014	Motion Picture Sound Editors Golden Reel Awards	Best Sound Editing: Sound Effects & Foley in a Feature Film	Peter Brown	Nominated
2014	MTV Movie Awards	Best On-Screen Duo	Vin Diesel & Paul Walker	Won
2014	Saturn Award	Best Action or Adventure Film		Won
2014	Saturn Award	Best Editing	Christian Wagner, Kelly Matsumoto and Dylan Highsmith	Nominated
2014	Premios Juventud	Best Picture		Won

== Video games ==
A cooperative racing video game, titled Fast & Furious: Showdown, was released on May 21, 2013. Developed by Firebrand Games and published by Activision for Microsoft Windows, PlayStation 3, Wii U, Xbox 360, and Nintendo 3DS, the game's story ties into the events in Fast & Furious 6, including bridging the events between the story of the film and those of its predecessor Fast Five, as well as the story of other films in the franchise. It is a Grand Theft Auto-style action game and received mainly negative reviews. A mobile game, Fast & Furious 6: The Game, was developed by Exploding Barrel Games and published by studio Kabam. It was released on May 16, 2013, for iPhone, iPod Touch, iPad, and Android devices. The story of Fast & Furious 6: The Game runs parallel to that of Fast & Furious 6, allowing players to race and customize vehicles alongside characters from the film.

== Sequels ==
Furious 7 features the final film performance of Walker, who died in a car crash in November 2013. During the film's production, Walker's character arc was reworked as "retired", and his brothers Caleb and Cody were hired as stand-ins to recreate Walker's likeness using CGI. This effort made Furious 7 the "most critically and commercially successful film in the [Fast & Furious] franchise". It was followed by The Fate of the Furious (2017), serving as the start of a next trilogy of films that includes F9 (2021) and Fast X (2023). An eleventh and final mainline film, Fast Forever (2028), is in production.
