= Brian O'Conner =

Fictional character of Fast & Furious films

- Fast & Furious character
- Paul Walker as Brian O'Conner in Fast & Furious 6 (2013)
- First appearance: The Fast and the Furious (2001)
- Last appearance: Furious 7 (2015)
- Created by: Gary Scott Thompson; Erik Bergquist; David Ayer
- Portrayed by: Paul Walker (Note: Paul Walker's younger brothers, Caleb and Cody, and John Brotherton were used as stand-ins for Brian after Walker's death.)

In-universe information
- Aliases: Brian Earl Spilner, T. Bridges
- Nicknames: Snowflake, Bullet, Buster
- Gender: Male
- Occupation: LAPD detective (formerly); FBI agent (formerly); Street racer Auto mechanic
- Family: Dominic Toretto (brother-in-law); Letty Ortiz (sister-in-law); Jakob Toretto (brother-in-law); Brian Marcos Toretto (nephew)
- Spouse: Mia Toretto
- Children: Jack; Olivia
- Nationality: American
- Affiliation: Crew members: Dominic Toretto; Roman Pearce; Tej Parker; Letty Ortiz; Vince (deceased); Leon; Jesse (deceased); Han Lue; Gisele Yashar; Rico Santos; Tego Leo; Luke Hobbs

Brian O'Conner is a fictional character and the former protagonist of the Fast & Furious franchise. He is portrayed by Paul Walker and first appeared on film with fellow protagonist Dominic Toretto in The Fast and the Furious (2001). Brian was created by screenwriter Gary Scott Thompson, who was inspired by an article on street racing that was published in the May 1998 issue of Vibe magazine. Walker was directly approached by director Rob Cohen to play the character.

O'Conner, under the alias Brian Earl Spilner, first interacts with Dominic as an undercover police officer tasked with bringing him to the law. However, he helps him evade police capture twice, and also helps erase the criminal record of childhood friend Roman Pearce. These events help build many of his attributes: often the second in command to Dominic, Brian is shown to be honorable, honest, and protective, especially in regards to his family and wife, Mia Toretto. Brian is also respectful and believes in delivering fair justice. He is also a keen driver, and challenges Dominic, the implied strongest racer in the group, to races throughout the series.

The role's popularity allowed Walker to become a bankable Hollywood star. He won the 2002 and 2014 MTV Movie Awards for Best On-Screen Team with Vin Diesel for his performances, and Walker became strongly identified with the character, with Brian being widely considered among the primary reasons of the longevity of the series. After Walker's death, the character was retired in Furious 7 (2015).

== Character biography ==
=== Early life ===
Brian was born on July 14, 1978, and raised by his mother in Barstow, California. He remembers little of his father and is close childhood friends with Roman Pearce; attending the same high school, the pair also dated the same women.

Once Brian earned his driver's permit, he was involved in a five-car pile-up on Interstate 40 driving with his mother. The brakes of the car in front locked up, while another car hit them from behind. He joined the Los Angeles Police Department (LAPD), and two months into his tenure on the force, Roman was arrested for housing stolen cars in a garage. While Brian was not involved in the arrest, Roman assumed Brian may have helped him in some capacity; Roman then resents his childhood friend and his association with law enforcement.

== Appearances ==
=== The Fast and the Furious ===
During the events of the first film, Brian is working as an undercover detective with the LAPD, who assigns him the task of solving a series of semi-trailer truck hijackings. He is given a very short amount of time to find the people responsible before the truckers start arming themselves with shotguns and taking matters into their own hands. Their only lead is a description of the vehicles used — black Honda Civics with green neon underglow.

When investigating the street race scene, Brian then meets Dominic Toretto whose crew he later infiltrates, first as a rival racer, in a race which he loses, then as a member after helping Dom escape the police. While running with Dom, he proceeds to investigate rival race crews led by Johnny Tran (played by Rick Yune) and Hector (Noel Gugliemi). He even goes as far as to organize and lead a large SWAT team into Johnny Tran's house after finding large amounts of merchandise, the kind from the highway robberies, while infiltrating his garage. Although the merchandise is illegal, they find nothing on Tran except a few minor charges — which leaves only Dom as a suspect. Brian soon finds out Toretto is responsible after watching him suddenly leave in the middle of a party at Race Wars and seeing Mia weeping to herself. He then reveals himself to Mia as a police officer and convinces her that if he does not get to her brother and his crew fast, they could get seriously injured or killed by the truckers who have begun to carry firearms.

As Brian and Mia race out to stop Dominic from making another highway robbery, two of his drivers, Letty (Michelle Rodriguez) and Vincent, are injured in the process, with Letty rolling her car on the side of the road and Vincent being shot in the side by a shotgun from the truck driver whom they tried to hijack. Brian saves Vincent, only to reveal to Dom that he is a cop. Brian later finds Dominic at his house attempting to look for Jesse (Chad Lindberg) when Tran and his accomplice roll up on their motorbikes pulling a drive-by shooting on the Toretto house, narrowly missing everyone there except for Jesse who is killed in the process.

Both men then drive after Tran and his accomplice, with Dom running the accomplice off the road while Brian fatally shoots Tran. Afterward, Brian chases Dom, whom he then races, resulting in Dominic winning closely just before he is hit by a truck. After surviving his car rolling over, Brian pulls him out of the wreckage only to give him the keys to his vehicle, claiming "I owe you a ten-second car" (the price he paid for losing the earlier race was his car). This leads to his aiding and abetting charge, resulting in his removal from the LAPD.

=== The Turbo Charged Prelude for 2 Fast 2 Furious ===
Brian leaves Los Angeles before the LAPD gets their chance to arrest him for letting Dominic escape. While the FBI launch a national manhunt for him, Brian travels across Arizona, New Mexico, and Texas, winning every street race he participates in using his red Dodge Stealth for his money. However, he is forced to ditch his car at a motel in San Antonio when police officers are notified of his presence. When they collect the car, he manages to hitch a ride from an unknown woman (Minka Kelly), despite her knowing who he really is. She drops him at a used car lot, with him realizing she knows that he is a wanted man. There, he buys a green Nissan Skyline GT-R R34. Later, collecting money from street races, he modifies the car with new rims and repaints it silver before traveling eastbound and winning more races on the way. Upon reaching Jacksonville, Florida, Brian heads south toward Miami.

=== 2 Fast 2 Furious ===
Brian – now living in Miami, Florida – competes part time as a street racer for his friend Tej Parker (Ludacris). While racing, he is caught by the local authorities and is facing jail time for his minor charges such as destruction of property (while infiltrating Toretto in the first film) and aiding and abetting Dominic Toretto. However, US Customs Agent Markham (James Remar) later gives him an offer to work undercover to infiltrate a local drug kingpin named Carter Verone (Cole Hauser) in exchange for a clean record. Seeing that they can't pin any charges on Verone until evidence of his payoff is in transit, O'Conner is in charge of being placed as a driver while undercover for Verone. Brian is given a partner named Dunn, whom he quizzes regarding his knowledge of cars, and Dunn fails. Brian then proceeds to request his own driver, saying if he doesn't get the driver he wants, he won't participate in the operation and take his chances in Chino.

When Markham agrees to Brian's terms, Brian and his old FBI boss, Agent Bilkins (Thom Barry) seek out his childhood friend Roman Pearce (Tyrese Gibson) who is now a Demolition Derby driver. Not being on good terms, they scuffle on the ground much like from their childhood days since Pearce is unhappy with Brian being a police officer and was arrested two months after Brian got out of Police Academy for possessing eight stolen cars, which Pearce blames Brian for, despite his knowing nothing about it. He is able to convince Pearce to accept the deal. After the agreement is settled, Bilkins and Markham then introduce Brian and Roman to Monica Fuentes (Eva Mendes), an undercover US Customs agent working with Carter. Brian and Roman are then given their cars. Brian drives a 2002 Mitsubishi Lancer Evo VII, and Roman drives a 2002 Mitsubishi Eclipse Spyder.

While infiltrating Carter Verone, both men are successful in getting into the organization, aided by Monica Fuentes. Monica, who has fallen in love with Brian, warns him that Verone intends to kill them at the end of their mission. Now the stakes are that if they fail, they go to jail or if they succeed, they get executed. With those choices, both men hatch a scheme to avoid jail time and being shot dead. Pearce reconciles with Brian, accepting that his arrest was not his fault. With help from Tej, they orchestrate a "scramble"—after driving into a garage they later have hundreds of race cars coming out, having switched cars with Tej and Suki (Devon Aoki) while in the garage.

The cars they later move out in are outfitted with ejection seats to rid themselves of unwanted guests. Brian is forced to meet up with Verone, but after beating up Carter's henchman (with help from Pearce) he proceeds to do a classic car jump onto Verone's boat. Afterward they arrest Verone and are off the hook. He and Monica exchange a meaningful glance, and the end scene is shown between O'Conner and Pearce walking away with their pockets full of Verone's drug money planning to open up a high-performance garage.

=== Fast & Furious ===
Paul Walker reprises his role as Brian O'Conner in the fourth installment of the film series. This film takes place after the events of The Fast and the Furious and 2 Fast 2 Furious, much before the events of The Fast and the Furious: Tokyo Drift.

Brian O'Conner, now a fully reinstated FBI Agent, is given the task of bringing down Arturo Braga, a known drug trafficker in Los Angeles and his connections to the street racing world, although his real identity is unknown to the public. Brian is also not surprised to see Dominic Toretto doing a Suge Knight style balcony interrogation of possible lead David Park. Brian is aware of this because sometime at the start of the film, Letty had contacted him in secret with her proposal to infiltrate Braga's organization in exchange for Dom's safe return, a feat that had gone wrong which leads to her death, which ultimately motivated Dominic to find the person responsible for his wife's murder.

Despite being a full agent again, he is still seen doing his trademark bending the rules and occasionally breaking them to solve the case. Similar to the first film, Brian is under pressure by his superiors to bring in Dom, who is still a fugitive in the film.

Brian and Dom both infiltrate Braga's crew, despite neither being aware of who Braga really is. Following the hijacking a Hummer H1 with $60 million worth of heroin in it, Brian sets up a sting operation to meet Braga to exchange some of the heroin for $6 million in cash, but not before making a deal with his superiors to have Dom pardoned for his past crimes if the operation is successful. After having the FBI do a fingerprint database search for Braga, whose real identity turns out to be his "second-in-command" Ramon Campos, fellow FBI agent Michael Stasiak, envious of and at odds with O'Conner, sends in a SWAT team to ruin the bust, forcing Braga to go back into hiding. As a result of this, Brian is taken off active duty.

Later, as O'Conner and Dominic go into Mexico to search for Braga, they are given a tip off by one of Braga's people, in this case, his liaison Gisele Yashar (Gal Gadot), who has taken an attraction to Dom. Brian and Dom successfully apprehend Braga at a church in Mexico, and helps Dom kill Fenix Calderon (Laz Alonso), who is responsible for Letty's death, by holding his ankles while Dominic impales him with a henchman's '73 Chevy Camaro F-Bomb. Despite requesting clemency for Dom, he is given a sentence of 25 years to life without the possibility of early parole. This leads Brian to resign from the FBI, and he joins Mia and two of Dom's Latino accomplices from the beginning of the film (Leo and Santos, played by Don Omar and Tego Calderón respectively) in freeing Dom from his prison bus by driving towards the bus in similar style to Dominic's heists, which later leads to Dominic's appearance in Tokyo, Japan during the end film events of The Fast and the Furious: Tokyo Drift.

There is no mention of the fate regarding his plans for opening an automotive shop with childhood friend Roman Pearce in Miami. It is also revealed in this film why he let Dominic go in the first film—that he respected Dominic more than he did himself, and perhaps due to the fact that his raid on Tran's estate indirectly caused Jesse's death.

During the course of the film, Brian also rekindles his old romance with Mia Toretto, Dominic's younger sister. After seeing her in an FBI interrogation room, he releases her, and the two go out for coffee. During the conversation they share, she reveals her anger at his "betrayal" of their group at the end of the first film, questions why he let Dom go (to which Brian claims he doesn't know) and tells him how hurt she was when he left her suddenly, with no explanation. While Brian initially puts professional distance between himself and Mia, he finally admits to her that leaving her was the hardest thing he ever did, and later, when Mia breaks down, Brian comforts her, resulting in a passionate reunion between the two.

=== Fast Five ===
O'Conner and Toretto get caught in a crossfire with corrupt businessman and ruthless drug lord Hernan Reyes in Rio de Janeiro and plot to steal all of Reyes' money to buy their freedom. It is revealed in Fast Five that O'Conner's father was not there for him and O'Conner does not know anything about him, unlike the close bond that Toretto's father had with both his children. He is often worried that he will behave in the manner that his father did, but Toretto reassured him that he won't because he will keep an eye on him if he does. O'Conner had been in juvenile detention with Roman before he became a cop. O'Conner has also rekindled his relationship with Mia, and she becomes pregnant with his child.

=== Fast & Furious 6 ===
O'Conner, Toretto, and Mia live peacefully in the Canary Islands in Spain, where Mia gives birth to their son. O'Conner joins Toretto's team in complying with the request of Agent Hobbs to take down rival gang leader Owen Shaw. When the team realizes that Braga worked for Shaw, O'Conner decides to enter the United States to interrogate him about Shaw. After successfully questioning Braga and returning to London, O'Conner starts to feel guilty for letting Letty go undercover, which led to her amnesia and subsequent work for Shaw. The group captures Shaw and convinces Letty to side with them. O'Conner apologizes to Letty, who says that she might not remember him, but if she did work for him, she would have done of her own free will. Shaw reveals that he had captured Mia, leading to a high-speed chase after Shaw's airplane, where Mia is rescued and Shaw is crippled and put into a coma. Hobbs then grants the group's amnesty, and the entire crew move back to America, where Mia, Toretto and O'Conner have decided to reside in the old Toretto home.

=== Furious 7 ===
Brian and the rest of the crew return to the U.S. and live normal lives again. Brian begins to accustom himself to life as a father but misses the old life he once enjoyed.

Meanwhile, Dom learns from his sister, Mia, that she is pregnant again, but fears to tell Brian because of his longing for missing the bullets. However, their house is destroyed by Deckard Shaw, brother to Owen Shaw, who has come out of hiding for vengeance, which forces Brian, Roman, Tej, Letty, and Dom to go after him. Before leaving, Brian makes a promise to Mia that after Shaw is dealt with, he will dedicate himself to his family.

To rescue Ramsey, a hacker who has a device known as 'God's Eye' that can locate anyone on Earth, the team airdrops their cars over the Caucasus Mountains and ambushes Jakande's convoy and rescues Ramsey, finding out that she is a young woman. They then head to Abu Dhabi, where a billionaire has acquired the flash drive containing God's Eye. The team breaks into his penthouse and steals the flash drive. On both occasions, the team is pursued by Shaw, who engages in combat with Dom, with the team barely managing to escape.

With God's Eye, the team manages to track down Shaw, who is waiting at a remote factory. Dom, Brian, and Mr. Nobody, along with a covert ops unit, attempt to capture Shaw but are ambushed by Jakande and Jakande's militants, who have allied with Deckard. After the ambush, Nobody's men are killed, and Nobody is injured, though he manages to escape with Toretto and Brian, while Jakande obtains God's Eye.

Nobody warns Brian and Dom that Jakande will use God's Eye to hunt down Ramsey, who is the only one who can destroy it. They drive off, leaving Nobody behind to be evacuated by one of his 'stand-by' helicopters. Left with no other choice, the team returns to Los Angeles to fight Shaw, Jakande, and his men on their home turf. Dom plans to confront Shaw alone while Brian and the rest of the crew prepare to deal with Jakande. Just as they are preparing, Brian calls Mia and professes his love, fearing he may not survive, and learns that she is pregnant with a baby girl, motivating him to come back alive.

While Jakande pursues Brian and the rest of the crew with a stealth attack helicopter and a UAV, using God's Eye to track down Ramsey, they barely survive and manage to shut down God's Eye with Brian's help to establish a connection for Ramsey to hack it. In the aftermath, Hobbs kills Jakande by shooting the bag of grenades that Dom managed to throw inside the helicopter while also taking out the UAV. Deckard is defeated by Dom and imprisoned.

Finally at peace, the team celebrates at the beach. While Brian and Mia play with their son Jack, Dom, Letty, Ramsey, Roman, and Tej observe, appreciating their happiness and acknowledging that Brian is better off retired with his family. Dom silently leaves, not wanting to disturb the happy moment, and drives off. Brian notices and manages to catch up to him, asking Dom, "You thought you could leave without saying goodbye?" As he pulls up beside Dom's car in his white Toyota Supra, they look at each other and smile, then bid each other farewell. Brian turns off the main road, and Dom continues on ahead.

=== The Fate of the Furious ===
Brian does not make a physical appearance in The Fate of the Furious, but he, alongside Mia, is seen in a photo in Dom's car. He is also mentioned by Roman and Letty as when Dom betrays the team, Roman suggests that Brian would know why Dom betrayed them, but Letty reminds him that they all agreed to keep Brian and Mia retired from the team due to them wanting a normal life and for the safety of their children. Dom later names his son after Brian.

=== F9 ===
Brian does not physically appear in F9. However, Mia returns to the team when she learns that their current target is Jakob, the third Toretto sibling, who was separated from the family years ago, and informs Dom that Brian is looking after the children (including Dom's own son). The film concludes with Brian arriving at Dom's house in his blue Nissan Skyline to join the rest of the team in a post-mission barbecue, although he is not featured directly. Despite being an unseen background character in the film itself, Brian does make an appearance via archival footage in the film's trailer (alongside his son Jack).

=== Fast X ===
While not appearing in the current-day events of the film, Brian and Dom's previous vault heist is seen in the opening of the film via archival footage, introducing the film's villain, Dante, the son of Hernan Reyes.

== Character, traits and abilities ==
Brian's charismatic, level-headed personality often contrasts with Toretto's aggressive behavior. Despite his composure, Brian is a secret adrenaline junkie; once, he confides in Dom (when describing the challenges of fatherhood) that he misses the dangerous lifestyle. He is also shown to be brave, particularly when protecting friends or loved ones by making seemingly lethal, impulsive or courageous decisions.

Brian was first unknown with the car tuning community, but after with meeting Toretto, he became more positive, active in the racing scene, becoming a skilled mechanic.

Brian is very interested in tuners, especially Nissan Skyline models. He owned two Nissan Skyline GT-R R34's (one in the second movie and one in the fourth), Nissan C10 Skyline and finally a Nissan GT-R.

Apart from Skylines, Brian has owned: a tuned Mitsubishi Eclipse in the first film (but it's hinted this was paid for by the LAPD-FBI task force he had gone undercover for), a Lancer Evo, a Subaru (twice) and a Supra (twice).

Brian is shown to be an excellent hand-to-hand combatant. While Dom utilizes fighting techniques based on his impressive strength Brian utilizes his training from his time in law enforcement possessing martial arts abilities and extensive hand-to-hand combat skills.

== Cars ==
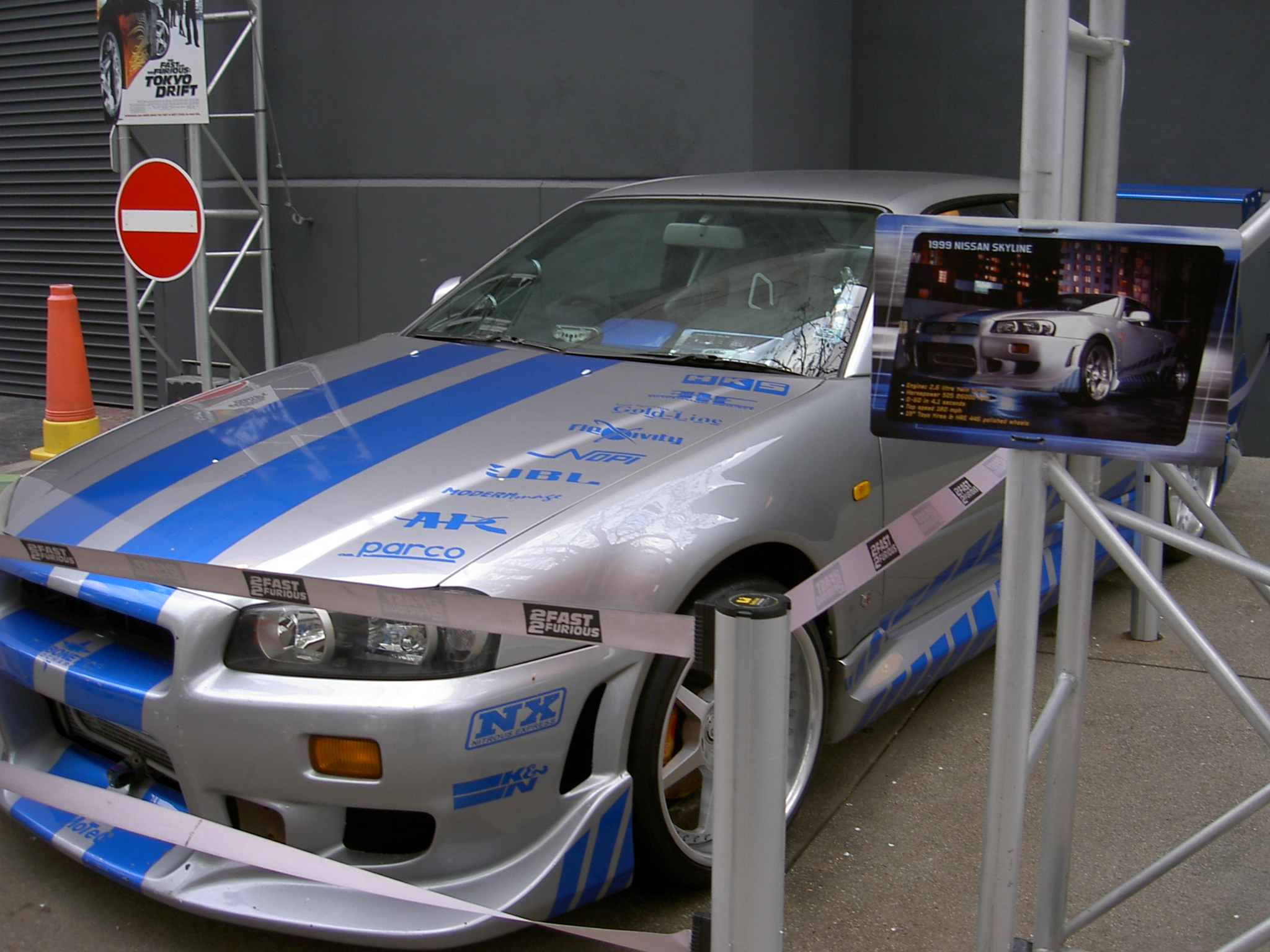
O'Conner's Nissan Skyline GT-R from 2 Fast 2 Furious.

The following cars are driven by Brian O'Conner throughout the series:

- 1995 Mitsubishi Eclipse – Shot at by Johnny Tran and later destroyed after ruptured nitrous tanks explode; equipped with a 420A motor with an upgrade to a T3 turbo and front mount intercooler, standalone fuel management and nitrous. This was the car Brian used to race Dom in the beginning of the first film.
- 1995 Toyota Supra – Brian handed over the keys to Dominic after he crashed his Dodge Charger R/T, claiming he owed him a ten second car. In the movie, Jesse referred to spending $10,000-$15,000 on this car when in reality there was over $150,000 invested in the Supra.
- 1999 Ford F-150 Lightning – Seen bumping the curb outside of Harry's performance shop "The Racer's Edge", and when Brian is pulled over and arrested by Sergeant Tanner.
- 1995 Dodge Stealth – Seen in The Turbo Charged Prelude for 2 Fast 2 Furious; now a fugitive, he races with it until it's impounded by the FBI then later replaces it with a Nissan Skyline GT-R R34 on his way to Miami.
- 2002 Mitsubishi Lancer Evolution VII – Provided for Brian, in 2 Fast 2 Furious for his undercover mission of taking down drug lord Carter Verone in Miami. It is fitted with a tracking device. He later switches cars in an elaborate scramble sequence, continuing his mission undetected.

Note: The Evo VII had the taillights from the Mitsubishi Lancer OZ Rally and it was both the 2002 Evo VII and 2002 Lancer OZ Rally.

- 1969 Yenko Camaro – Won from fellow racer Korpi, this is the car Brian switches into after the scramble sequence and drives for the rest of the film. It is outfitted with an ejector seat, which somehow fails, and is forced to drive with Verone's henchman to the checkpoint. Brian later uses the Camaro to drive off the shore onto Verone's boat to rescue Monica after she is taken captive.
- Nissan Skyline GT-R R34 – Driven by Brian in 2 Fast 2 Furious and Fast & Furious. In the second film, it is colored silver from House of Kolors and blue stripes. In the fourth film, Brian is given a second Skyline and drives this car in the race against Dominic, which he very narrowly loses after Dom cheats near the end of the race. Later, when he and Dom confront Fenix Rise about Letty's death, Dom (having anticipated betrayal) blows up all the racers' cars (including Brian's) by igniting the nitrous tanks equipped in his own car. The car returns in the ending of F9, with the same color as in the fourth film.
- 2006 Hummer H1 – Briefly driven by Brian and Dom after his own car is blown up to escape from Rise; it contains the heroin being transported to Braga. He later hides it in the LAPD impound lot in plain sight.
- 2009 Subaru Impreza WRX STI – "Given" to Brian by Dom after he blows up his Skyline, claiming the line from the first film that Dom now owes him a "ten second car". He drives this car for the rest of the film, using it to apprehend Braga in a cathedral in Mexico and racing against Rise with it. The other one is used in the seventh film to help and prevent Ramsay from Bus in Azerbaijan.
- 1970 Dodge Charger R/T – Dominic Toretto's car, but driven by Brian at the end of Fast & Furious when he, Mia, Santos and Leo intercept Dom's prison bus.
- 2009 Nissan GT-R – Like in the ending Fast Five, Brian got the car the result of a robbery in Rio De Janeiro, just like Dom who bought a black Dodge Challenger. In 2 films later he switched into a blue color with some modifications.
- 2012 Chrysler Town & Country (minivan) – This is Brian's first time driving a Minivan in a film, used to take their children to school. The same car appears in the next scene, where Brian's son, Jack, was protected by him via his sliding door when the Toretto family's house exploded.
- 2013 McLaren MP4-12C – for a short scene in his arrival in Abu Dhabi, Brian drives the blue one.
- Another Toyota Supra (1998 Facelift model) – in the ending of Furious 7, Brian drives a white one to catch up to and say good bye to Dom.

== Reception ==
The role won Walker the MTV Movie Award in 2002 and (posthumously) 2014, for Best On-Screen Team, both of which he shared with Vin Diesel. Further recognition came in the 2015 Teen Choice Awards, again posthumously. Walker's portrayal has made the actor becoming strongly identified with the character.

His relationship with Dominic Toretto has been described as a bromance.
