= Dominic Toretto =

Fast & Furious fictional character

- Fast & Furious character
- Vin Diesel as Dominic Toretto outside the Colosseum in Fast X (2023)
- First appearance: The Fast and The Furious (2001)
- Created by: Gary Scott Thompson; Erik Bergquist; David Ayer
- Portrayed by: Vin Diesel; Vinnie Bennett (young); Vincent Sinclair (child)
- Voiced by: Vin Diesel

In-universe information
- Occupation: Street Racer; Auto Mechanic
- Spouse: Leticia "Letty" Ortiz
- Children: Brian Marcos "Little B" Toretto (Note: Brian Marcos is the son of Dom through Elena Neves, with whom he had a relationship from Fast Five to Fast & Furious 6.)
- Relatives: Abuelita Toretto (grandmother); Jack Toretto (father); Unknown mother Jakob Toretto (brother); Mia Toretto (sister); Brian O'Conner (brother-in-law); Tony Toretto (cousin); Fernando (cousin); Jack O'Conner (nephew); Olivia O'Conner (niece)
- Nationality: American

Dominic "Dom" Toretto is a fictional character and the main protagonist of the Fast & Furious franchise. He is portrayed by Vin Diesel and first appeared on film with the other fellow protagonist Brian O'Conner in The Fast and the Furious (2001). Dominic was created by screenwriter Gary Scott Thompson, who was inspired by an article on street racing that was published in the May 1998 issue of Vibe magazine, while Diesel was heavily sought after to play the character. The character also appears in the animated television series Fast & Furious Spy Racers (2019–2021) and the video game Fast & Furious Crossroads (2020), both voiced by Diesel.

As the patriarch of a group of street racers Dom acts as an influential voice. He was forced into the role of primary caregiver following his father's untimely passing. As the leader, he initially worked as an auto mechanic but eventually progressed to orchestrating carjackings, a multi-million-dollar heist, and illicit jobs for government agencies.

Dominic is gruff and strong and has a volatile temper, especially when his family is in danger. He preaches morality and loyalty and is often seen as affectionate and religious. He is married to Letty Ortiz with whom he raises a son. He is also implied to be the group's strongest and most skilled racer, a title that is challenged persistently by friend and brother-in-law Brian O'Conner.

The role made Diesel a Hollywood star, and remains the role with which he is most associated. He won the 2002 and 2014 MTV Movie Awards for Best On-Screen Team with Paul Walker for his performances. Diesel has served as a producer for the franchise's later installments.

== Development ==
The Fast & Furious film series was inspired by an article on street racing, "Racer X", that appeared in the May 1998 issue of Vibe magazine. Having witnessed his father's death in a stock car race, Dom is left with the responsibility of taking care of his younger sister, Mia Toretto, and leading the racers dependent on him. Vin Diesel was reportedly paid $2.5 million to star in The Fast and the Furious and $15 million to star in and produce Fast Five.

== Appearances ==
Dominic Toretto is a fearless street racer, auto mechanic, and ex-convict. The character is the older brother of Jakob and Mia Toretto. Throughout the series, Dom's crew has perpetrated many high-speed semi hijackings, stealing millions of dollars worth of electronic merchandise. He has spent most of his life running from the law. He is married to Letty Ortiz, his longtime partner.

=== The Fast and the Furious ===
In the first film, Dom runs his own automotive garage while Mia takes care of the family's grocery store in Echo Park. He also runs his own street race team, which consists of Letty, Vince, Leon, and Jesse. Dominic has a feud with his Vietnamese-American rival Johnny Tran due to a business deal that went sour and Tran catching Dom sleeping with his sister. Unknown to the public, he and his team drive black Honda Civic coupes and stage daring semi hijackings on the freeways, taking home millions of dollars in electronic appliances. He forms a friendship with rookie racer Brian Earl Spilner (Brian O'Conner), who saves him from arrest when the LAPD raid a street race gathering. When showing Brian the 1970 Dodge Charger he had been working with his father before he died, he reveals what happened to the latter: During the last stock car race of the season in 1989, Dominic watched as his father Jack was run off the track by another racer, Kenny Linder, when Linder's car clipped his bumper. Jack was killed instantly when his stock car crashed into the wall at 120 miles per hour and burst into flames. Dominic remembered hearing his father screaming as he burned to death, but the people who witnessed the accident explained that his father had died before the fire spread to the fuel tanks and ignited it. Dominic had been the one screaming. A week following the accident, Dominic encountered Linder and when given the opportunity, Dominic attacked Linder, beating him with a wrench. Dominic only intended to hit him once but lost control of his temper and kept attacking Linder until he couldn't lift his arm anymore. Linder's injuries rendered him unable to race and Dominic was banned for life from the racetracks. During the Race Wars, Johnny Tran blames Dominic for a raid by SWAT forces; SWAT came into his house, causing disrespect to his family. Dom then attacks him and is promptly led away by Vince, who tells him to "chill out". During a hijacking job gone wrong, Dominic discovers Brian's true identity as undercover LAPD officer named Brian O'Conner. Following a drag race that ends with Dominic's 1970 Dodge Charger getting totalled, Brian hands him the keys to his Toyota Supra, as law enforcement have found out that Toretto has stolen millions in electronics with his crew. Dom ends up escaping to Mexico, while Brian, now a wanted man himself for aiding a known felon, flees the state.

=== 2 Fast 2 Furious ===
Dom plays no role in the second film's events, but is referenced when Brian tells Roman Pearce that the guilt he felt over Roman's arrest is what motivated him to let Dom go.

=== The Fast and the Furious: Tokyo Drift ===
Dom makes a cameo appearance at the end of the film challenging Sean Boswell in a drift race with his gunmetal silver 1970 Plymouth Road Runner, which he won from his friend Han Lue.

This film takes place after the events of Fast & Furious 6 and during Furious 7.

=== Fast & Furious ===
In Fast & Furious, Dominic, Letty, and their gang (made up of Han, Cara, Leo and Santos) lead a successful hijacking of a gasoline tanker in the Dominican Republic, which catches the attention of the authorities, causing Dom to disband the team and leave Letty to protect them. Despite still being a fugitive due to the events of the first film, Dominic returns to L.A. upon hearing of Letty's death at the hands of Fenix Calderon. He and Brian once again team up to take down Mexican drug lord Arturo Braga, who had ordered Fenix to kill Letty and others involved in a drug run. He later finds out Brian was the last person who had contact with Letty; this enrages him, and he attacks Brian before the latter explains that Letty came to him for help in clearing Dom's name so he could return to the United States, becoming a spy to infiltrate Braga's organization. The two reconcile over the events of the 1st film and team up to avenge Letty's death. After successfully extraditing Braga back to the U.S., Dom turns himself in to the authorities and is sentenced to 25 years to life in prison without the possibility of early parole. However, the bus carrying him is ambushed by Brian, Mia, Rico and Tego; once Dom is sprung from the bus wreckage, the group flees the U.S. as fugitives.

=== Fast Five ===
In the fifth, Dominic reunites with Brian, Mia and Vince in Rio de Janeiro, Brazil. They quickly make an enemy of drug lord Hernan Reyes after stealing a vehicle that contains information of his $100 million fortune, who has them framed for the murder of three DEA agents during a drug run on a train. As a means to get even with Reyes and avoiding capture, Dom and Brian form a team with Roman Pearce, Tej Parker, Han, Gisele Yashar, Rico and Tego to stage a heist and steal Reyes' stash of US$100 million in cash. Elite bounty hunter and DSS federal agent Luke Hobbs is sent to Brazil to hunt down and capture Dom and his gang, but when he is ambushed by Reyes' men, during which all of his team are killed, he forms an unlikely alliance with Dom and helps the gang execute their heist. Vince is badly wounded during the gunfight and later succumbs to his injuries. After killing Reyes, Hobbs allows Dom and his gang to leave Brazil with their stash by giving them a 24-hour window; Dom gives Vince's share of the money to his wife and son. Hobbs' partner Elena Neves also leaves the force and becomes Dominic's new love interest.

=== Fast & Furious 6 ===
In the sixth film, Dom is living peacefully with Elena, with no fear of being chased after. Hobbs tracks him down and offers him a job to help him hunt down mercenary Owen Shaw and his crime syndicate in exchange for pardons for him and his entire team; Hobbs also reveals that Letty is alive and working for Shaw. Dom and Brian reassemble their gang (minus Rico and Tego, both of whom are in Monaco) in London for the mission, agreeing to the deal. During the mission to capture Shaw, Dom is shot by Letty, and he later discovers that she is suffering from amnesia as a result of the explosion that nearly killed her in Fast & Furious. He saves her from falling to her death while the gang stops Shaw aboard a military tank on a bridge in Spain. Shaw, however, reveals his backup plan of kidnapping Mia, and uses her as leverage in order to be released from custody and allowed to leave with the top-secret microchip that was removed from the tank. Despite the death of Gisele, Dom and his gang defeat Shaw and kill his men while saving Mia and the microchip in a daring chase at a NATO military airfield. Hobbs grants their pardons, and Dom and his gang move back to the United States, even reclaiming Dom's old home. Seeing Dom and Letty back together for good, Elena bids him farewell and returns to working with Hobbs. In a post credit scene, Owen Shaw's elder brother, Deckard Shaw, apparently kills Han in Tokyo and calls Dom to threaten him.

=== Furious 7 ===
In Furious 7, it is revealed that Owen Shaw survived the events of the previous film but is comatose, and his older brother Deckard Shaw has gone rogue and is hunting Dom's team. Some time after the events of Tokyo Drift and Fast & Furious 6, Dom and Letty have returned to L.A., but Letty later breaks up with Dom in order to find herself again after her memory loss. Meanwhile, Shaw kills Han in Tokyo (bridging the story between this film and Tokyo Drift) and sends a bomb to Dom's house, blowing it up. After retrieving Han's body from Sean Boswell in Tokyo, a revenge-driven Dom decides to take Shaw down alone, but is stopped by a Covert Ops leader and Hobbs' friend Mr. Nobody. Nobody offers Dom a way to hunt Shaw through a software named "God's Eye"; however he also must save its creator, a hacker named Ramsey, from terrorist leader Mose Jakande and his men. Agreeing to the deal, Dominic, Brian, Letty, Tej and Roman lead a daring rescue through the mountains of Azerbaijan and succeed in liberating Ramsey from her captors. Ramsey tells them that she sent God's Eye to her friend Zafar in Abu Dhabi. After a successful retrieval of the God's Eye (that also involved Dom and Brian jumping a vehicle through three buildings), they find Shaw's hideout, but are ambushed by Jakande's men; many of Nobody's men are killed and Nobody himself is gravely injured, while Dom and Brian barely escape. Afterwards, Dom decides to take down Shaw and Jakande on their home turf in L.A. Dom and Shaw end up in an intense fight on the rooftop of a parking garage, while Brian and the others distract Jakande and Ramsey initiates a hack to shut down God's Eye for good. They succeeded in doing so, and Jakande is killed when Dom hooks a bag of grenades onto his chopper (which Hobbs shoots) before crashing his vehicle, causing his friends to believe that he died in the process. Letty then reveals that she has regained her memories of their relationship (which also reveals that they were married somewhere in between the story of Los Bandoleros and Fast & Furious), and Dom recovers from being unconscious. After this, Brian decides to retire from the crew in order to spend time with his family. Dom leaves without saying goodbye, prompting Brian to catch up to him at an intersection, and the two have one last drive before parting ways.

The final drive scene was done to give Brian's role a clean retirement and a send-off after the actor who portrays him, Paul Walker, died in a single vehicle accident back in 2013.

=== The Fate of the Furious ===
In the eighth film, Dom and Letty are on honeymoon in Cuba, where Dom is approached by a mysterious, seductive woman known as Cipher. After betraying his team during an operation in Berlin to steal an EMP device they were assigned to recover, it is revealed that Cipher — the true mastermind behind both the attempted creation of the Nightshade device in Fast & Furious 6 and the near-theft of the God's Eye hacking device in Furious 7 — has captured Elena and Dom's previously-unknown son, using them as blackmail tools to ensure Dom's cooperation. During the subsequent conflict, Dom at one point acts against Cipher to protect Letty from Cipher's right-hand man and second-in-command, Connor Rhodes, and in retaliation Cipher allows Rhodes to kill Elena. Despite Cipher's dismissal of Dom's views on family and her access to multiple surveillance systems, Dom manages to use his contacts to pass on a message to Magdalene Shaw, Deckard and Owen's mother, allowing her to retrieve her sons in return for them breaking into Cipher's plane via a tracking device slipped into Dom's necklace. Once the Shaws retrieve his son (which Dom couldn't do himself as the locking system required two people), Dom kills Rhodes, avenging Elena's death before rejoining his team and destroying a Russian nuclear submarine that Cipher was attempting to steal. Although Cipher escapes, Dom vows to Elena to protect their new son, naming him Brian, after his brother-in-law and best friend.

=== F9 ===
A now-retired Dom, who is raising little Brian on a farm with Letty, is called by Mr. Nobody to stop a genocide mission led by Dom's estranged younger brother Jakob. It is revealed that Dom banished Jakob from the family because he believed that he caused their father's death by sabotaging the stock car's engine, causing it to burst into flames when it crashed. Dom and Jakob fight each other several times in the film, with Jakob going as far as to wanting Dom to either live under his shadow or get killed. Jakob reveals to Dom that he tampered with the car's engine because their father told him to, as he was trying to throw the race to clear some debts, but his plan went wrong when Kenny Linder hit his car by using his dirty tactics. Towards the end of the film, however, Otto betrays Jakob, who teams up with Dom, killing Otto and destroying Cipher's UAV. Dom gives Jakob the keys to his car – just as Brian did for Dom several years ago – allowing Jakob to evade custody.

=== Fast X ===
Dom and Letty are continuing to raise his son at the Toretto home, when the team is assigned a new mission in Rome. Though Dom and Letty decide to stay behind, they are visited by Cipher, who reveals to them that Dante Reyes, the son of the late drug lord Hernan Reyes whom Dom and the crew robbed in Fast Five, is coming for them. After Little Nobody confirms that there was no mission assigned, Dom and Letty travel to Rome to rescue them, but their failure to do so results in Letty being arrested while Dante successfully frames Dom's team for the destruction. Dom is then visited by Tess, the daughter of Mr. Nobody, who warns him that both Dante and the new leader of the Agency, Aimes, are coming after him. Dom then tracks down Dante in Rio de Janeiro, challenging him to a street race, which he loses after saving Isabel Neves, the sister of Elena, from a car that Dante lodged a bomb into. Dom is later apprehended by Aimes, but the two seemingly form an alliance after Dante attacks the vehicle that they are in. Aware that Dante is going for little Brian next, Dom joins forces with Jakob again and rescues little Brian from Dante, with Jakob sacrifices himself to protect Dom. They are soon cornered by two remotely controlled semi trucks after arriving at a dam, where Dom tries to warn his team of Dante's ambush. Aimes reveals his allegiance with Dante moments after shooting down the team's plane, and Dom escapes with little Brian by driving off the dam before the collision. Dante sets off bombs he planted on the dam just after they emerge from Dom's car, leaving their fates unknown.

== Characterization ==
Dominic has been described as "a gruff but affectionate father to his loyal pack of renegades, providing them with barbecue, protection, and a rough moral code to live by." Vin Diesel has described Dominic as "a character who is strong, who is a caretaker." In contrast to Brian's estranged relationship with his father, Dominic is shown to "put family first" and be very protective of Mia. He is also implied to be religious, insisting that all members in a dinner table say grace and that the first person to take a bite must bless the meal. Dominic is of Puerto Rican descent. His Puerto Rican grandmother is introduced in Fast X.

In The Fast and the Furious, it is revealed that Dominic's volatile temper stems from a painful incident during his teenage years, when his father, a stock car racer, was killed in a race after a driver named Kenny Linder accidentally sent him to the wall at 120 mph. Distraught by his father's death, Dominic assaulted Linder a week later with a torque wrench and left him hospitalized with severe head injuries. Dominic served time (2 years) in prison and was banned from racing for the attack. He nearly replicates the action while fighting Hobbs in Fast Five, only to (purposely) miss Hobbs' head by an inch when Brian, Mia and Vince begs him to stop.

In Fast Five, Dominic recalls the influence his father had on him. His father would help Mia with her homework every day and send her to bed, then would stay up late reading the next chapter to make sure he could help her the next day. On Sundays, the family would attend church and host a barbecue for the neighborhood; those who did not attend church would not be allowed at the barbecue.

However, Dominic is also obsessed with racing. In the first film, he says: "I live my life a quarter mile at a time. Nothing else matters: not the mortgage, not the store, not my team and all their bullshit. For those ten seconds or less, I'm free." In The Fate of the Furious, Cipher repeats a similar phrase to Dominic to question his loyalty to his family. Over the course of the series Dom exhibits the strength, stamina, and reflexes of a world-class athlete. He is also an excellent marksman and hand-to-hand combatant due to years of fighting.

== Cars ==
=== Dominic's Charger ===
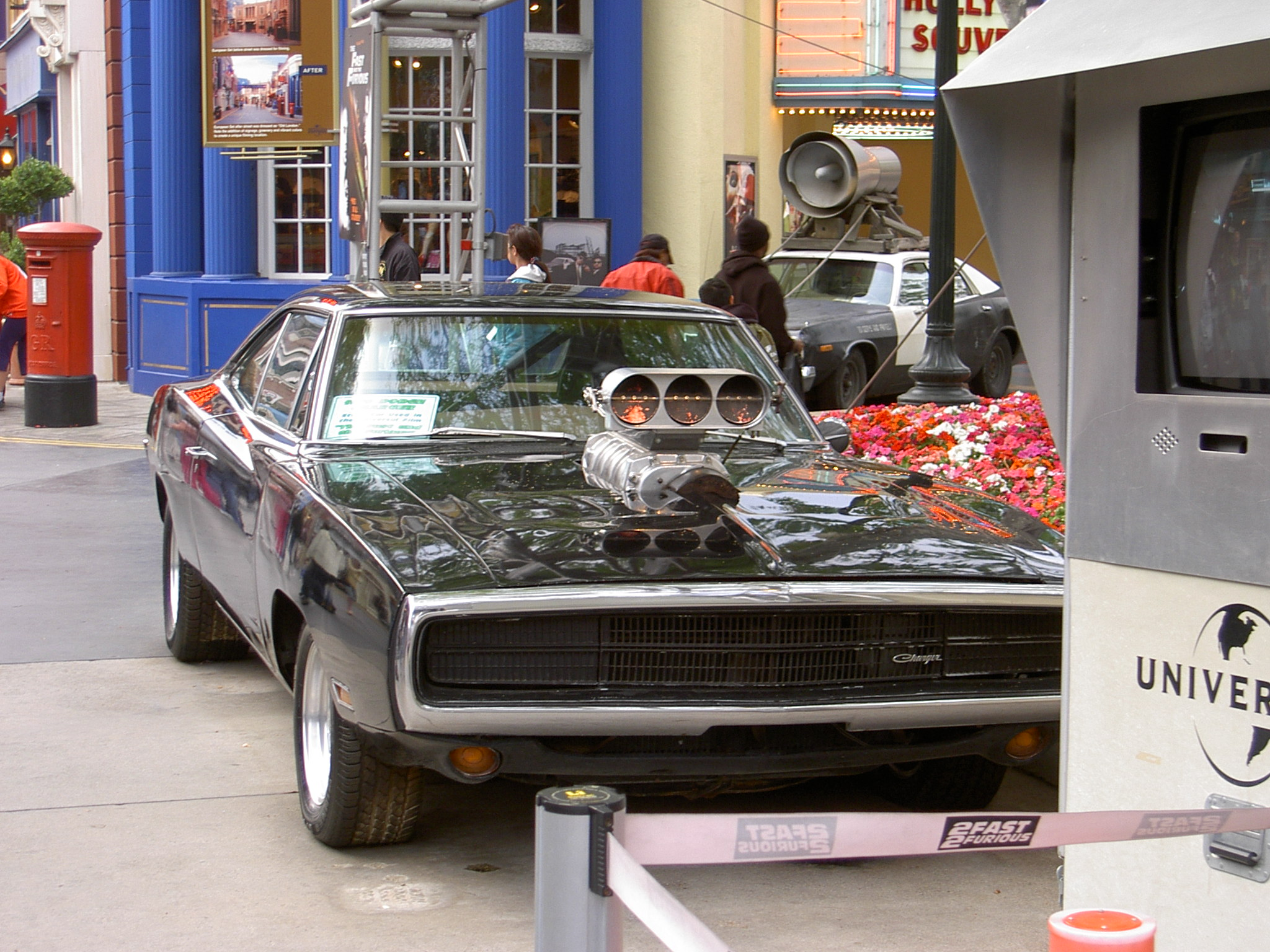
Dominic's 1970 Dodge Charger R/T picture car on display at Universal Studios Hollywood.

In four of the films, Dom drove his late father's black 1970 Dodge Charger. In the first film, Dom tells Brian that he and his father built the 900 horsepower car, but that he had never driven it, because it "scares the shit out of [him]." Dom uses it to help Brian by attacking one of Tran's henchmen. He later races Brian's Supra with it; however, he totals it when he collides with a truck.

In Fast & Furious, he sees that Letty has rebuilt it for him, as she was hoping that he would return to the United States. Later in the film, Dom takes it to Mexico and shields Brian's car with it, but destroys it by running into a stack of propane canisters in the tunnels. In the final scene of the film, Brian is shown to have rebuilt it, and Dom recognizes the sound of the engine while riding in a prison bus. In Fast Five, it is shown that Brian brakes in front of the bus, causing the bus to collide with it and flip. Dom uses it throughout the film to win cars to test for their vault heist. Meanwhile, Hobbs uses it to track the location of Dom's gang by having his men check camera feeds for a 1970 Charger. When Hobbs comes to arrest Dom, he crashes his Gurkha F5 into his Charger, cutting it in half, which triggers a fight between the pair.

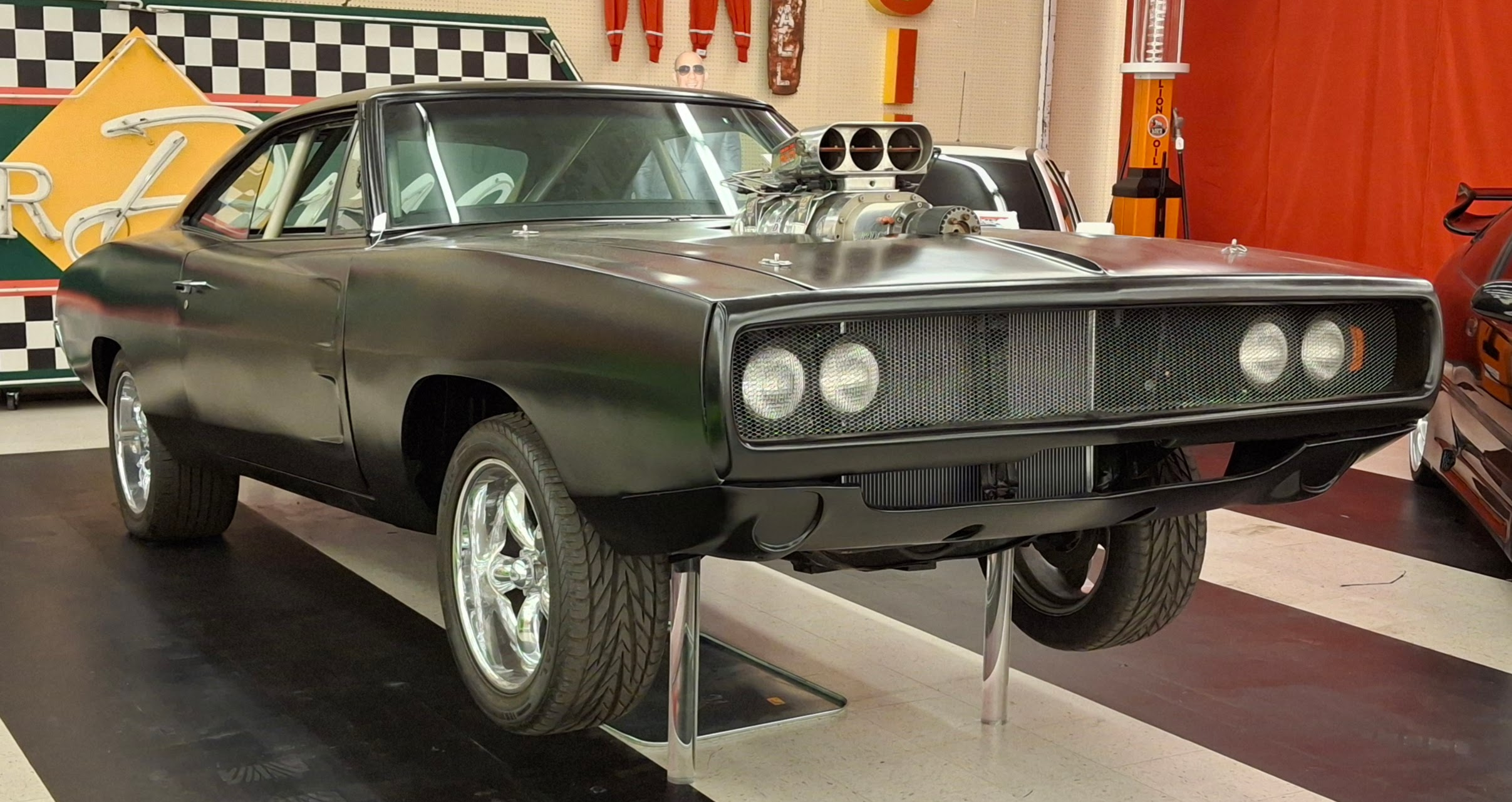
The screen used car from Fast & Furious (2009) and the beginning of Fast Five. The car generally followed this style of appearance until F9.

In Furious 7, near the end of the movie he goes to his home which was recently blown up by Deckard Shaw, and in the garage is his Charger covered up. He uncovers it revealing the slightly different new look. He takes the Charger to the top of a rooftop where he faces Shaw in a game of chicken. When the parking lot is later collapsing due to missiles, Toretto ramps it off the building destroying it yet again.

The car appears hoodless in F9.

The car goes through some changes. In the first film, it is chrome trimmed, while in the fourth film it is black trimmed, with an extra grill cover. In the fifth film it is matte black, with black wheels and the supercharger removed. In the seventh film, Torretto's Charger has the supercharger again. The car still has black trim but is no longer matte black but metallic black. Also a different set of rims. In F9, it once again resembles the first film with Silver Trim.

In Fast & Furious 6, Dom gives his nephew Jack a diecast replica of his black Charger, hoping to keep him away from Brian's habits of favoring imports. Later in the film, Dom drives a maroon Dodge Charger Daytona, which is acquired by Tej Parker at a car auction in London. While it is not the same car as his signature black Charger, it is a direct nod to the Charger.

At the very end of Furious 7, Toretto is seen with the Project Maximus Ultra 1968 Dodge Charger.

In The Fate of the Furious, Toretto drives an armoured version of his usual Charger in the film's final confrontation.

The car appears again in Fast X. Dennis McCarthy, who has been creating cars for the films, tried to make the car look closer to its original appearance, compared to the "crazy" appearance in the previous three films.

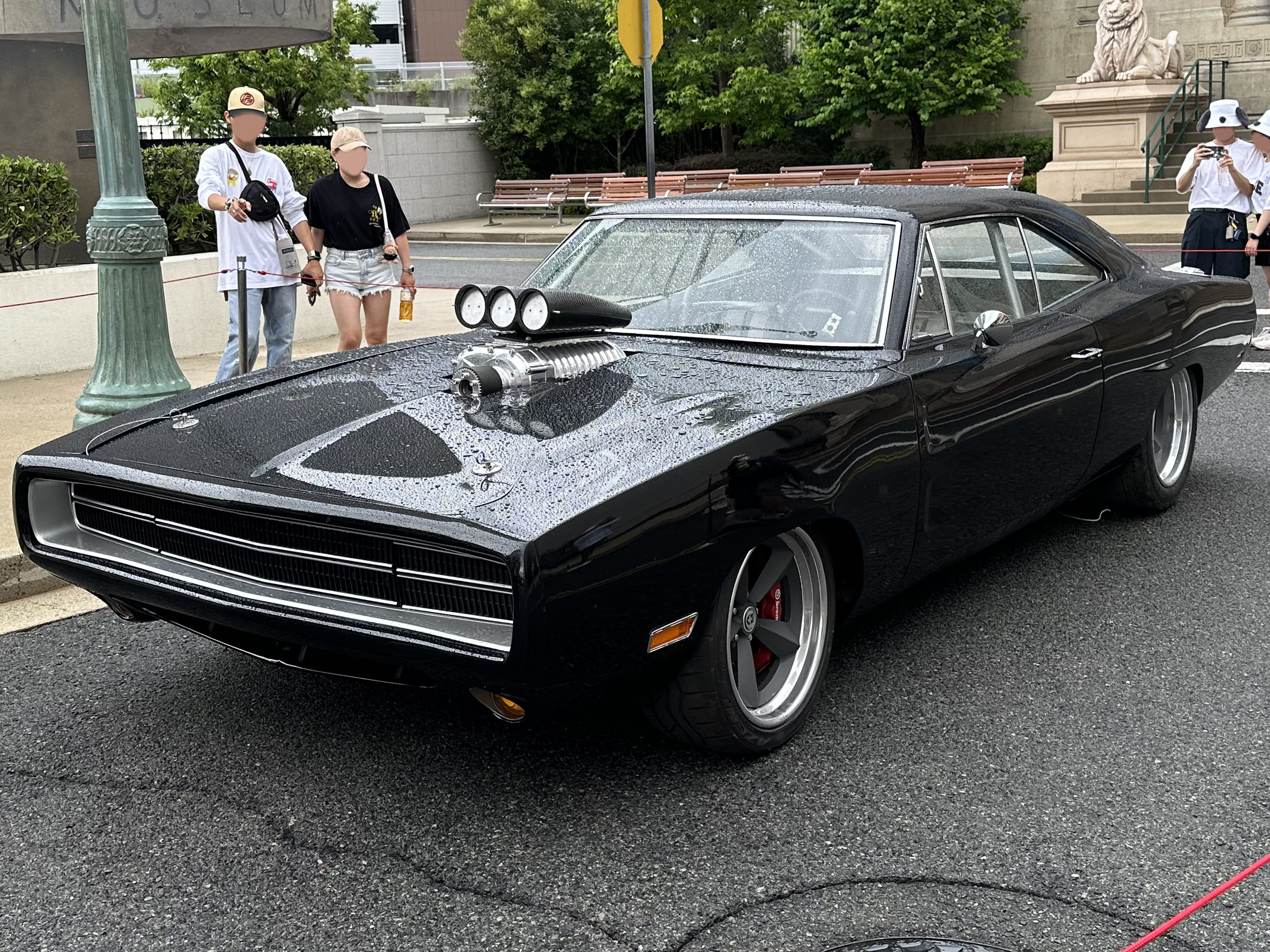
The redesgined Toretto Charger from Fast X

=== Car list ===
Cars used by Dominic Toretto
Film	Car
The Fast and the Furious	1995 Honda Civic
The Fast and the Furious	1993 Mazda RX-7
The Fast and the Furious	1970 Dodge Charger R/T
The Fast and the Furious	1994 Toyota Supra
The Fast and the Furious	1970 Chevrolet Chevelle SS (post credits)
The Fast and the Furious: Tokyo Drift	1970 Plymouth Road Runner
Fast & Furious	1987 Buick GNX
Fast & Furious	1970 Chevrolet Chevelle SS
Fast & Furious	2009 Subaru Impreza WRX STI
Fast & Furious	1970 Dodge Charger R/T
Fast & Furious	1973 Chevrolet Camaro F-Bomb
Los Bandoleros	1966 Pontiac Bonneville
Fast Five	1970 Dodge Charger R/T
Fast Five	1963 Chevrolet Corvette Stingray Grand Sport
Fast Five	2011 Dodge Charger R/T Police Car
Fast Five	2010 Dodge Charger SRT8
Fast Five	2009 Dodge Challenger SRT8
Fast & Furious 6	2009 Dodge Challenger SRT8
Fast & Furious 6	2010 BMW E60 M5
Fast & Furious 6	1969 Dodge Charger Daytona
Fast & Furious 6	2013 Dodge Charger SRT8
Furious 7	1974 Plymouth Barracuda
Furious 7	1970 Plymouth Road Runner
Furious 7	1970 Dodge Charger
Furious 7	2015 Dodge Charger
Furious 7	2014 W Motors Lykan HyperSport
Furious 7	1970 Dodge Charger R/T
Furious 7	1968 Maximus Charger
The Fate of the Furious	1961 Chevrolet Impala Sport Coupe
The Fate of the Furious	1950 Chevrolet Fleetline
The Fate of the Furious	2018 Dodge Challenger SRT Demon
The Fate of the Furious	1971 Plymouth Road Runner GTX
The Fate of the Furious	1968 Dodge Ice Charger
F9	1970 Dodge Charger Tantrum
F9	1970 Dodge Charger R/T
F9	2020 Dodge Charger Hellcat Redeye
F9	1965 Dodge Charger
F9	1968 Dodge Charger 500
Fast X	1970 Dodge Charger R/T
Fast X	2020 Dodge Charger Hellcat Redeye
Fast X	2010 Dodge Charger SRT8 (archival footage)
