= W Motors =

Emirati Automobile manufacturer

W Motors SAL
- Type: Private
- Industry: Automotive
- Founded: July 11, 2012; 14 years ago in Beirut, Lebanon
- Founder: Ralph Debbas
- Headquarters: Dubai, UAE
- Number of locations: 2 (2019)
- Area served: Worldwide
- Key people: Ralph Debbas (CEO)
- Products: Luxury cars
- Owner: Ralph Debbas (partially)
- Number of employees: 51–200
- Website: www.wmotors.ae

W Motors SAL is an Emirati sports car manufacturing company based in Dubai that develops high-performance luxury sports cars. The company's activities include automotive design, research and development, as well as vehicle engineering and manufacture.

== History ==
Development of the W Motors brand took seven years. European auto manufacturers Carrozzeria Viotti, Magna Steyr, RUF Automobile and StudioTorino were involved in W Motors's development. Initial investment topped US$13 million, some of which came from FFA Private Bank of Lebanon, who became a stakeholder in the company.

W Motors was founded in Lebanon in July 2012.

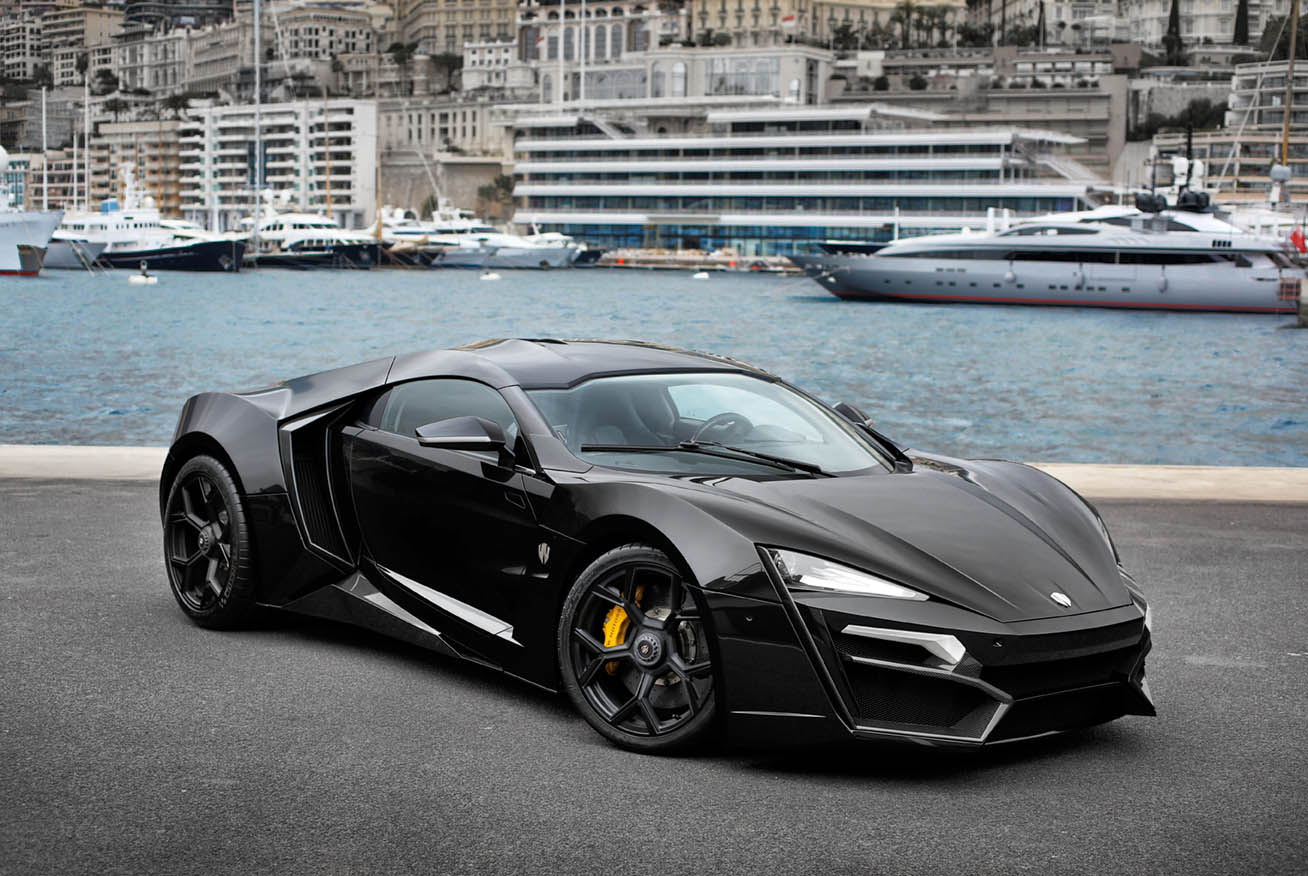
A Lykan HyperSport photographed at Port Hercule in Monaco

W Motors launched its first prototype model, the Lykan HyperSport, at the Qatar International Motor Show in January 2013. Shortly thereafter, the company moved its headquarters to Dubai, in the United Arab Emirates (UAE).

Also in 2013, Universal Studios ordered twelve Lykan HyperSport stunt cars to appear in the film Furious 7, one of which is available for public viewing at the W Motors Gallery in Dubai. It is the most expensive car ever featured in the Fast and the Furious films, though the vehicles seen on screen were driveable stunt models rather than production vehicles. The Lykan HyperSport's first pre-production model debuted at the Dubai International Motor Show on 5 October 2013.

Other venues where the Lykan HyperSport was displayed include the Dubai International Boat Show in the United Arab Emirates; the Historical, Vintage, and Classical Cars Museum in Kuwait; and Cohen&Cunil in Marbella, Spain.

The road-ready model of Lykan HyperSport premiered at Top Marques Monaco in April 2014. The Lykan HyperSport officially went on sale in December 2014. Limited to 7 units, the HyperSport was priced at $3.4 million and was manufactured in Turin, Italy.

Founder Debbas announced in April 2015 that W Motors would be opening an automotive design academy, W Design School, in 2017, which has been delayed to 2020 with the upcoming W Motors factory. Also in April 2015, Furious 7 debuted, featuring the Lykan HyperSport.

In June 2015, the Abu Dhabi police purchased a Lykan HyperSport.

W Motors had a three-person automotive design team as of 2012, all graduates of the transportation design degree program at Coventry University. It operates several facilities in Europe, with its main production facility in Turin, Italy, and has collaborated with international partners and suppliers from the automotive industry, including Magna Steyr, StudioTorino, Ruf Automobile, Novasis Ingegneria, ID4Motion, and the University of Tokyo in the technical field, and Franck Muller Watches and Quintessentially Lifestyle Concierge Services in the luxury field.

The company's second model, the Fenyr SuperSport, debuted in November 2015. Two SUV models, which were to be built in the UAE and have a price range of US$200–300K, were set to debut in April 2016, at the Beijing International Automotive Exhibition. A sedan, whose model name has not been announced, was scheduled to debut in 2015 or 2016; it would have had a US$200,000 retail price. Neither the SUVs nor the sedan have been confirmed as future production lines.

W Motors planned to its factories and manufacturing facilities to the port city of Jebel Ali in the UAE sometime in 2016. The plant was expected to make over 200 cars per year by 2017, when production of the sedan and SUV lines were intended to begin. It would have been the first automotive manufacturing facility in the region with on-site R&D, and was intended to include a test track. W Motors confirmed in September 2017 that the facility would be delayed until 2020.

The company also revealed in September 2017 that the Fenyr SuperSport's road-legal model would debut in November of the same year, along with the opening of a new showroom in City Walk 2. They also teased a new model, planned to be revealed in 2018, which would be priced around US$500,000 and will compete with the likes of the Lamborghini Aventador SV or the Ferrari F12.

=== Present day ===
W Motors currently operates two locations: a design centre in the Dubai Business Bay, and the flagship Gallery in City Walk.

The company claims to have sold all seven of the Lykan HyperSport units, and has confirmed that the 10-unit Fenyr SuperSport Launch Edition series has sold out (five to a Japanese businessman).

On 17 November 2019, British racing driver Oliver Webb was announced as a W Motors Brand Ambassador and took part in the company's first track experience two days later. He will drive at W Motors events and assist in the development of their upcoming car.

Construction of the US$100 million W Motors factory began in January 2020, with Stage One expected to be complete by October 2020. At the same time of the announcement, W Motors confirmed the first 9 Fenyr SuperSport Launch Editions had been delivered, and batch of approximately 60 cars was in production.

In February 2020, Ralph Debbas announced the company would produce an electric supercar.

== Models ==
W Motors has produced three vehicles independently, three vehicles in partnership with ICONIQ Motors, and has planned and announced a variety of others.

=== Produced/In production ===
==== Lykan HyperSport ====
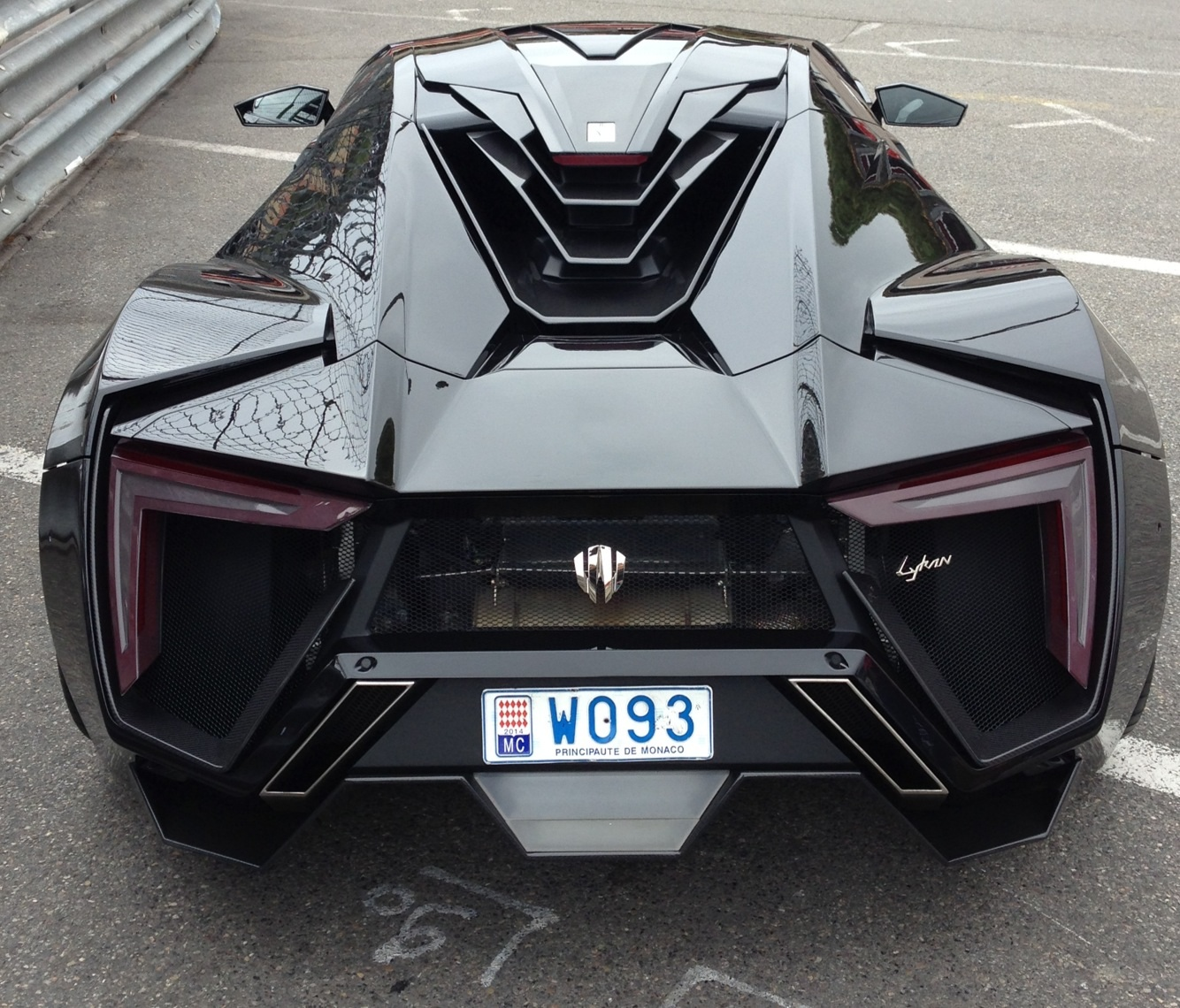
Rear view of the Lykan HyperSport

The Lykan HyperSport is powered by a flat 6-cylinder 3.7 L (3,746 cc) twin-turbo mid-rear engine, developing 780 hp (582 kW; 791 PS) and 960 N⋅m (708 lb⋅ft) of torque, claiming 0 to 100 km/h (62 mph) in 2.8 seconds with a maximum speed of 404 km/h (251 mph). It features a holographic display with interactive motion and tactile interaction. LED headlights are made up of a titanium blade encrusted with diamonds and the taillights with sapphires. A 24-hour concierge service is also available from Quintessentially.

==== Fenyr SuperSport ====
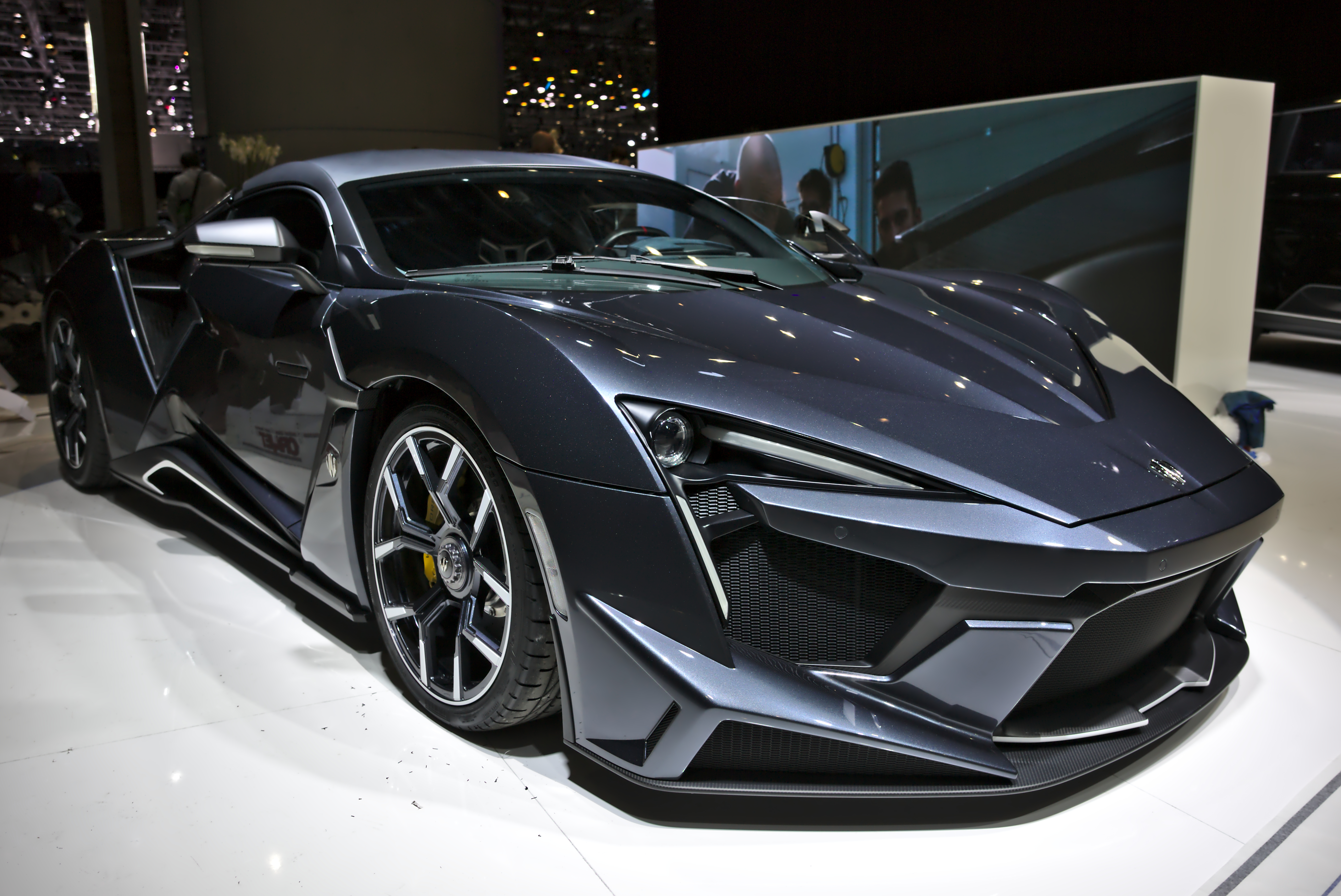
Fenyr SuperSport at Geneva Motor Show 2018

In 2013, W Motors announced it would manufacture a second line of supercars, that was later unveiled as the $1.4 million Fenyr SuperSport, named after Fenrir, a monstrous wolf in Norse mythology. This car, with production limited to 110 units total, focuses on high-performance and more discreet luxury details when compared to the Lykan HyperSport. The Fenyr SuperSport features a 4.0L twin-turbocharged Flat-6 with 900 hp (670 kW; 910 PS) and 811 lb⋅ft (1,100 N⋅m), with a 0–60 mph (97 km/h) performance time of 2.7 seconds, and a top speed over 249 mph (401 km/h), and a curb weight of approximately 1,200 kg (2,600 lb). The Fenyr Supersport was unveiled at the 2015 Dubai International Motor Show. On November 29, 2017, with the opening of the new W Motors Gallery in Dubai, the production version of the Fenyr SuperSport was revealed, with many changes from the concept.

The Fenyr SuperSport was being developed in concert with an eco-friendly racecar program fostered by Quimera, an electric-car manufacturer. The results of this partnership are unclear.

==== Ghiath ====
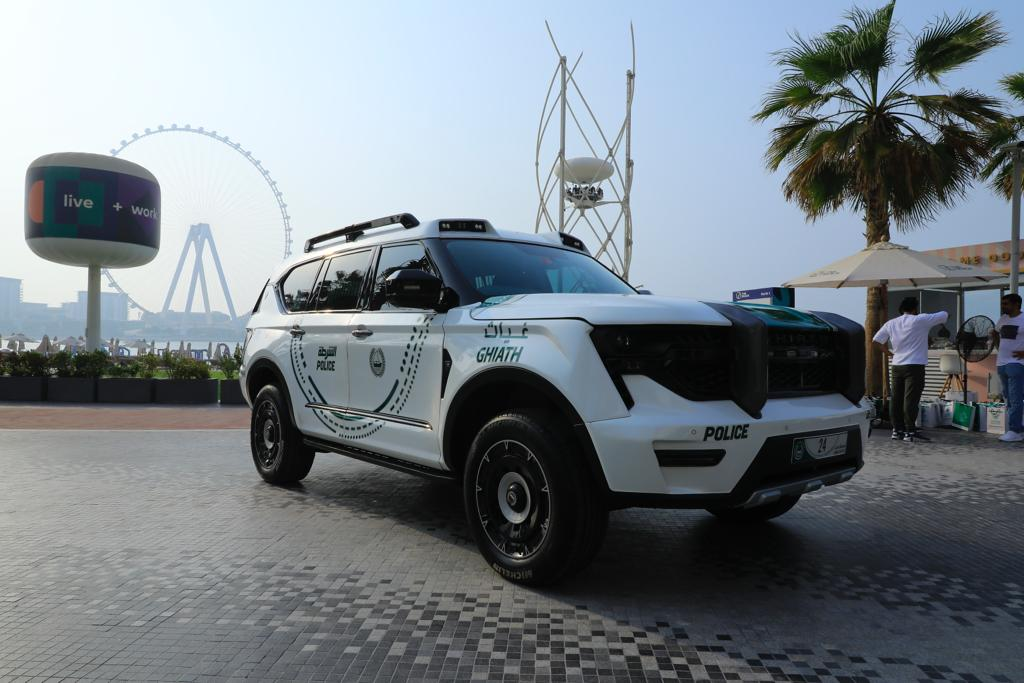
Dubai Police Ghaith SUV

W Motors Special Project Divisions developed a prototype police vehicle for the Dubai government, originally referred to as Beast Patrol. The vehicle was renamed Ghiath by the Crown Prince of Dubai.

Little is known regarding technical specifications of the vehicle. The first vehicle is currently in use by the Dubai Police, and is badged by the Safe City Group rather than W Motors.

=== Productions with ICONIQ ===
==== ICONIQ Model 7 ====
W Motors' first collaborative project with ICONIQ resulted in the Model 7, an upscale electric passenger van.

==== MUSE ====
An autonomous passenger vehicle known as MUSE, designed by W Motors, debuted at Auto Shanghai 2019. The concept was presented at the brand's showroom in February and claims level five automation. It will be produced in the UAE.

=== Future projects ===
W Motors will continue to produce ICE-powered cars until 2026, as it transitions to a wholly electric brand.

==== Fenyr SuperSport HSF ====
A racing version of the SuperSport, the Fenyr SuperSport HSF, will use what W Motors is calling a "hybrid synthetic fuel" and be carbon-neutral.

==== Luxury Sedan ====
An as-yet unnamed sedan model was scheduled to debut in 2016. An estimated 100 sedans per year will be produced, each costing approximately US$50,000. The sedan's premiere was planned for the September 2015 Frankfurt Motor Show. It is unknown if this model will be produced.

==== Sport Utility Vehicle ====
Designs for a US$250,000 luxury SUV were released to CNN in 2015, and it was expected to begin production when the factory opened. It is unknown if this model will be produced.

==== Electric supercar ====
In February 2020, Debbas provided an interview with CNBC International to discuss W Motors' future electric supercar. Nicknamed 'Wolfie', the EV cost between US$600,000 and US$900,000 with a production run in excess of 500 units. The car should be able to travel 450 km on a single charge, with future developments pushing this past 1000 km. The car was powered by four electric motors producing 1,600 hp (1,200 kW; 1,600 PS), powering the car's 0–60 mph (0–97 km/h) time in less than 2 seconds. The car was fully developed and produced in the UAE at W Motors' new factory and debuted as a pre-production car by the end of 2020, with a production launch in early 2021.

== In media ==
The Lykan HyperSport originally gained much of its attention from its inclusion in the Fast & Furious franchise.

Project CARS, a motorsport racing simulator video game developed by Slightly Mad Studios and distributed by Bandai Namco Games, released the Lykan HyperSport as its first downloadable content (DLC) vehicle in May 2015. As of 2016, the Lykan HyperSport has also been included in eleven other video games, including Driveclub, Forza Motorsport 6, Forza Horizon 3, and CSR Racing 2 in January 2016 as DLC.
