= Ralph Debbas =

Lebanese automotive executive

- Born: 1987 (age 38–39); Lebanon
- Education: Lebanese American University; Coventry University
- Occupation: CEO of W Motors
- Years active: 2006-present
- Employer: W Motors
- Known for: Founding W Motors
- Board member of: Chairman and CEO of W Motors
- Awards: 2009; New Designer of Excellence; Trophée de L’Argus; 2013; The Visionary Entrepreneur of the Year; 2015; The Luxury Arab World Award; BIAF 2015 Award; 2019; Automotive CEO of the Year; 40 And Under 40
- Website: Official website

Ralph R. Debbas (born 1987) is a Lebanese automotive entrepreneur, designer, and businessman. He is best known as the chief executive officer of W Motors, which he founded in 2012, and the designer of the Lykan HyperSport.

== Early life and education ==
Debbas was born in Lebanon in 1987 to a family of industrialists.

Debbas studied economics and began to study graphic design at the Lebanese American University. He quit his graphic design course to study automotive design, which he studied with honours at Coventry University after turning down an offer from the Pratt Institute in the USA.

== Career in the automotive industry ==
Before starting development of W Motors, Debbas worked as a designer for Land Rover and Aston Martin.

In 2009, Debbas launched Wolf Design and Innovation Group (WDI Group), of which he was listed as Executive Head of Design. WDI Group worked on a variety of projects including boats, furniture and interior design, consumer goods, and graphic/web design, and was active in Beirut and Paris.

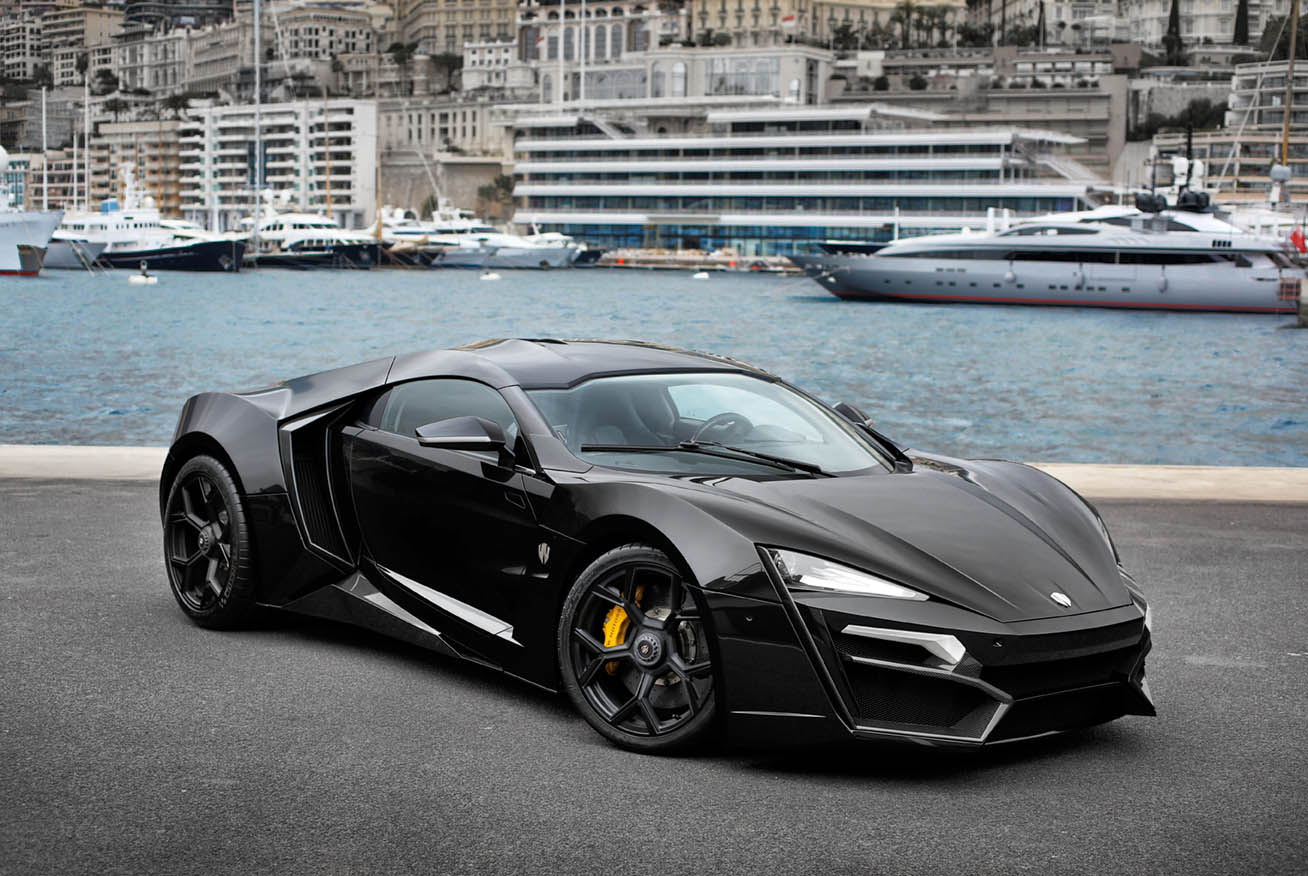
The Lykan HyperSport, the first car produced by W Motors and the first of Debbas's production designs

He began development of W Motors and design of the Lykan in 2006, and in 2008 had several design projects sponsored by the European Union. W Motors was officially founded in 2012 with the launch of the Lykan HyperSport. It is the first Middle Eastern car manufacturer, making Debbas the first automotive executive in the Middle East. According to Debbas, the Lykan HyperSport was deliberately extravagant because:

If I had launched an affordable car from the Middle East, nobody would have talked about it… But when you create a shock by selling a $3.4m car – and back in 2013 it was the most expensive car in the world – people will talk, whether it’s negative or positive.

He contributed to the design of the ICONIQ Model 7. The Fenyr SuperSport followed with production beginning in 2018, but was not designed by Debbas.

Debbas launched the W Motors consultancy division in 2019, which now makes up 70% of the company's business. As of 2020, he owns shares and is a director of W Motors Automotive Group Holding Limited. He continues as the CEO and chairman of W Motors S.A.L.

== Views on the automotive industry ==
Debbas has often spoken on the future of the transportation industry, particularly the impact of automation and electrification on vehicle ownership and manufacture.

Debbas believes that electrification of cars will become widespread and that as the development of self-driving technology advances, traditional car ownership will decline to the point were road transport is provided in a manner he compares to airlines: the role and importance of manufacturers will decline, and cars will be owned by providers. Because of this, he predicts his son Karl (born 2016) will never need to or may be unable to own a car or hold a driver's license.

He has stated that the Middle East has great potential for a local automotive industry, but lack of relevant knowledge in the region is a limiting factor.

== Awards ==
Debbas has been the recipient of several business and design awards during his career.

Year	Award	Conferred by	Ref.
2009	New Designer of Excellence	ND London	
2009	Trophée de L’Argus	ARGUS Paris	
2013	The Visionary Entrepreneur of the Year	CCS	
2015	The Luxury Arab World Award	Luxury Arab World	
2015	BIAF Award	Beirut International Awards Festivals	
2019	Automotive CEO of the Year	CEO Middle East Awards	
2019	40 And Under 40	Arabian Business	

== Personal life ==
Debbas has an extensive personal collection of cars produced in the 1990s.

== See also ==
- L'Argus (automobiles French magazine)
