= Furious 7 =

2015 film by James Wan

- Theatrical release poster
- Directed by: James Wan
- Written by: Chris Morgan
- Based on: Characters by Gary Scott Thompson
- Produced by: Neal H. Moritz; Vin Diesel; Michael Fottrell
- Starring: Vin Diesel; Paul Walker; Dwayne Johnson; Michelle Rodriguez; Tyrese Gibson; Chris "Ludacris" Bridges; Jordana Brewster; Djimon Hounsou; Kurt Russell; Jason Statham
- Cinematography: Stephen F. Windon; Marc Spicer
- Edited by: Christian Wagner; Dylan Highsmith; Kirk Morri; Leigh Folsom Boyd
- Music by: Brian Tyler
- Production companies: Universal Pictures; Original Film; One Race Films; MRC; China Film Co., Ltd.
- Distributed by: Universal Pictures
- Release dates: April 1, 2015 (TCL Chinese Theatre); April 3, 2015 (United States)
- Running time: 137 minutes
- Countries: China; United States
- Language: English
- Budget: $250 million
- Box office: $1.515 billion

Furious 7 (also known as Fast & Furious 7) is a 2015 action film directed by James Wan and written by Chris Morgan. It is the sequel to Fast & Furious 6 (2013), a follow-up to The Fast and the Furious: Tokyo Drift (2006), and the seventh installment in the Fast & Furious franchise. The film stars an ensemble cast including Vin Diesel, Paul Walker (in his final film role), Dwayne Johnson, Michelle Rodriguez, Tyrese Gibson, Ludacris, Jordana Brewster, Djimon Hounsou, Kurt Russell, and Jason Statham. In the film, Dominic Toretto, Brian O'Conner, and their team are recruited by covert ops leader Mr. Nobody to prevent terrorist Mose Jakande from obtaining a hacking program known as God's Eye, all while being hunted by Deckard Shaw, the brother of Owen Shaw.

Plans for a seventh installment were first announced in February 2012 when Johnson stated that production on the film would begin after the completion of Fast & Furious 6. In April 2013, Wan, predominantly known for horror films, was announced to direct the film. Casting revealed the returns of Diesel and Walker that same month. Principal photography began that September in Atlanta, but was indefinitely suspended in November after Walker died in a car crash; filming resumed in late March 2014 and ended in July, with Walker's brothers Caleb and Cody standing-in to complete his remaining scenes, causing delay to its 2015 release date, with other filming locations including Los Angeles, Colorado, Abu Dhabi and Tokyo. Brian Tyler, who had composed the score for Fast Five (2011), returned to compose the seventh installment.

Furious 7 premiered at the TCL Chinese Theatre in Los Angeles on April 1, 2015, and was released in the United States on April 3, by Universal Pictures. The film received positive reviews from critics for the performances, action sequences, direction and emotional tribute to Walker, with many considering it to be the best film in the franchise. It was a box-office success, grossing $1.515 billion worldwide, making it the third-highest-grossing film of 2015 and the fourth-highest-grossing film of all time at the time of release. It also set a record for the second-highest opening weekend of its time. It was the highest-grossing film of 2015 internationally and became the highest-grossing film of the franchise in the first twelve days of its theatrical release. A sequel titled The Fate of the Furious was released on April 14, 2017.

== Plot ==
After defeating Owen Shaw and securing pardons for their past crimes, (Note: As depicted in Fast & Furious 6 (2013)) Dominic Toretto, Brian O'Conner, and the team have returned to the US to live normal lives. Dom tries to help Letty Ortiz regain her memory, while Brian accustoms to life as a father.

Meanwhile, Owen's elder brother Deckard Shaw vows revenge for the now-comatose Owen. Deckard breaks into the DSS field office in Los Angeles to extract profiles of Dom's crew and fights Luke Hobbs and Elena Neves, detonating a bomb that severely injures Hobbs. A letter bomb sent by Deckard, who has killed Han Lue in Tokyo, (Note: As depicted in Fast & Furious 6 (2013) and The Fast and the Furious: Tokyo Drift (2006)) explodes and destroys the Toretto house.

Dom learns about Deckard from Hobbs and travels to Tokyo to retrieve Han's body. At Han's funeral in LA, Dom spots Deckard and chases him by car, but Deckard flees when a covert ops team, led by government agent Mr. Nobody, arrives. Mr. Nobody tells Dom that he will help them in stopping Deckard if Dom helps him retrieve God's Eye, a computer program capable of tracking anyone in the world on a digital network, and save its creator Ramsey from Mose Jakande, a Nigerian terrorist.

The team, including Dom, Letty, Brian, Tej Parker and Roman Pearce, airdrops their modified cars over the Caucasus Mountains in Azerbaijan and ambush Jakande's convoy, where they rescue Ramsey and leave for the Etihad Towers in Abu Dhabi. They steal the flash drive containing the God's Eye chip hidden in a W Motors Lykan HyperSport owned by a billionaire prince. With God's Eye secure, the team uses it to track Deckard, but Deckard, having expected this, has allied with Jakande, who ambushes them. The team is forced to flee while Jakande obtains God's Eye.

The team returns to LA. Dom plans to face Deckard, while Letty, Brian, Tej and Roman resolve to protect Ramsey from Jakande. As Jakande uses God's Eye to doggedly pursue the team with a stealth helicopter and an aerial drone, Ramsey attempts to hack into God's Eye. Hobbs leaves the hospital and destroys the drone with a stolen ambulance while Brian hijacks a signal repeater tower that allows Ramsey to remotely shut down God's Eye.

Jakande attempts to flee and spots Dom and Deckard in a street brawl atop a public parking garage. Jakande turns on Deckard and attacks both men. Dom uses the distraction to defeat Deckard and crashes his Dodge Charger onto Jakande's helicopter, allowing him to leave a bag of grenades on it. Hobbs shoots the grenades, killing Jakande.

Letty tearfully tells an unconscious Dom that she has regained her memories. Dom regains consciousness. Deckard is arrested by Hobbs and locked up in a black site prison. At the end, Dom and the team acknowledge that Brian has happily retired, opting to be with his family in peace, with another baby on the way. As Dom drives and recalls his memories with Brian, the two bid each other farewell.

== Cast ==
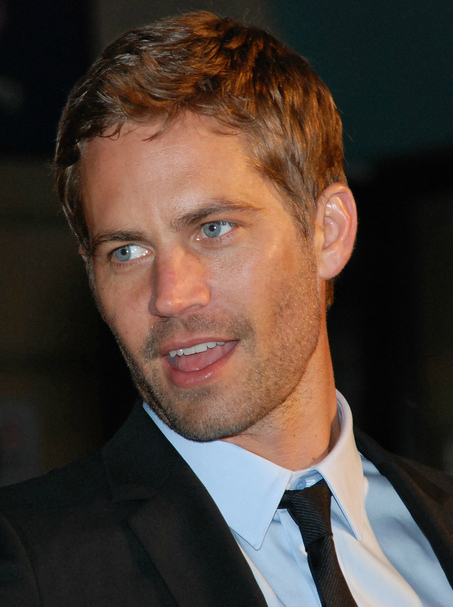
Furious 7 marked the final film performance of Paul Walker, who died in a car crash in 2013. The film is dedicated to his memory.

- Vin Diesel as Dominic Toretto: A former criminal, professional street racer and millionaire who has retired and settled down with his wife, Letty.
- Paul Walker as Brian O'Conner: A former LAPD police officer and FBI agent turned criminal who has retired and settled down with his wife, Mia, and their son, Jack. This was Walker's final Fast and Furious film, as well as his final film appearance.
  - Caleb and Cody Walker, Paul's younger brothers, were used as stand-ins to complete his remaining scenes following their brother's death.
- Dwayne Johnson as Luke Hobbs: A DSS agent who allied with Dom and his team after their outings in Rio de Janeiro and Europe. Johnson initially said that if Universal Pictures pursued the accelerated development of a seventh film beginning in the summer, he would be unable to participate due to scheduling conflicts with filming on Hercules (2014). However, as production for Furious 7 would commence in September, Johnson confirmed his return, for Hercules would complete production in time to enable him to shoot the film.
- Michelle Rodriguez as Letty Ortiz-Toretto: Dom's wife and a professional street racer, who was revealed to have suffered from amnesia after being presumed dead in Fast & Furious (2009).
- Tyrese Gibson as Roman Pearce: A former criminal and childhood friend of Brian from Barstow, and a member of Dom's team.
- Ludacris (credited as Chris “Ludacris” Bridges) as Tej Parker: A mechanic from Miami and a member of Dom's team.
- Jordana Brewster as Mia Toretto: Dom's sister and a former member of his team who has settled down with her husband, Brian, and their son, Jack.
- Djimon Hounsou as Mose Jakande: A Nigerian-born mercenary and terrorist who leads a private military company that allies with Shaw, and uses God's Eye to track its creator, and uses her to track down his enemies.
- Tony Jaa as Kiet: A member of Jakande's team who possesses great agility, athleticism, and fighting prowess. Thai martial arts actor Jaa was confirmed to have joined the cast in August 2013, making his Hollywood debut.
- Ronda Rousey as Kara: The Head of Security for an Abu Dhabi billionaire. Rousey's involvement was confirmed in August 2013. Having committed to The Expendables 3 (2014) at the same time, Rousey was forced to shoot both films back-to-back in order to allow herself 45 days to focus on training for her UFC championship rematch against Miesha Tate. Her participation in the film was similar to that of Gina Carano making the transition from mixed martial arts fighting to acting, following Carano's involvement in Fast & Furious 6 (2013).
- Nathalie Emmanuel as Ramsey: A British computer hacktivist and the creator of the God's Eye, who allies with Dom and his team after being saved from Jakande and helps them to regain control of her program.
- Kurt Russell as Mr. Nobody: The leader of a covert ops team who agrees to help Dom stop Shaw if he can help him prevent Jakande from obtaining a computer program called the God's Eye.
- Jason Statham as Deckard Shaw: A former special forces soldier and intelligence agent who seeks to avenge his comatose younger brother after his hospitalization at the hands of Dom and his team in Spain.

John Brotherton portrays Sheppard, Mr. Nobody's right-hand man. Sung Kang and Gal Gadot appear in archive footage as Han Lue and Gisele Yashar. Lucas Black reprises his role as Sean Boswell, an American street racer who lives in Tokyo whom Dom meets when he travels to Tokyo to claim the body of Han, a mutual friend of theirs killed by Shaw. In September, it was confirmed that Black had signed on to reprise his role as Boswell for Furious 7 and two more installments. Elsa Pataky reprises her role as Elena Neves, a DSS agent and former Rio police officer who moved to the United States to become Hobbs' new partner at the DSS. Luke Evans briefly reprises his role as Owen Shaw, Deckard's now comatose younger brother, from Fast & Furious 6 (2013), and Noel Gugliemi reprises his role as Hector for a cameo appearance from The Fast and the Furious (2001).

Ali Fazal portrays Safar, a friend of Ramsey to whom she sent the God's Eye for safekeeping. Fazal described his role as a cameo. Australian rapper Iggy Azalea (who also appears on the soundtrack) makes a cameo appearance as a racer at Race Wars. American singer/rapper T-Pain appears as himself as he DJs a party in Abu Dhabi. Romeo Santos makes a cameo appearance as Mando, who shelters Mia in the Dominican Republic and Klement Tinaj appears as one of the Race Wars racers.

== Production ==
=== Development ===
On October 21, 2011, the Los Angeles Times reported that Universal Studios was considering filming two sequels—Fast Six and Fast Seven—back-to-back with a single storyline running through both films. Both would be written by Chris Morgan and directed by Justin Lin, who had been the franchise's writer and director, respectively, since The Fast and the Furious: Tokyo Drift (2006). On December 20, 2011, following the release of Fast Five (2011), Vin Diesel stated that Fast & Furious 6 (2013) would be split into two parts, with writing for the two films occurring simultaneously. On the decision, Diesel said:

We have to pay off this story, we have to service all of these character relationships, and when we started mapping all that out it just went beyond 110 pages ... The studio said, 'You can't fit all that story in one damn movie!'

However, in an interview on February 15, 2012, Dwayne Johnson stated that the two intended sequels would no longer be filmed simultaneously because of weather issues in filming locations, and that production on this film would only begin after the completion of Fast & Furious 6 (2013).

In April 2013, during the post-production of the retitled Fast & Furious 6 (2013), Lin announced that he would not return to direct the seventh film, as the studio wanted to produce the film on an accelerated schedule for release in summer 2014. This would have required Lin to begin pre-production on the sequel while performing post-production on Fast & Furious 6 (2013), which he considered would affect the quality of the final product. Despite the usual two-year gap between the previous installments, Universal chose to pursue a sequel quicker due to having fewer reliable franchises than its competitor studios. However, subsequent interviews with Lin have suggested that the sixth film was always intended to be the final installment under his direction.

In April 2013, Australian director James Wan, predominantly known for horror films, was announced as the sequel's director, with Neal H. Moritz and Michael Fottrell returning to produce and Morgan returning to write the script, his fifth in the franchise. On April 16, 2013, Diesel announced that the sequel would be released on July 11, 2014. In May 2013, Diesel said that the sequel would feature Los Angeles, Tokyo, and the Middle East as locations.

=== Filming ===
Principal photography began in early September 2013 in Atlanta, with a casting call issued. Abu Dhabi was also a filming location; the production crew chose it over Dubai, as they would benefit from the Emirate's 30% rebate scheme. Pikes Peak Highway in Colorado was closed in September to film some driving sequences.

Spiro Razatos returned to serve as stunt coordinator and second unit director, having previously done so for Fast Five and Fast & Furious 6. He was joined in these duties by Jack Gill, who also worked with him on the previous two films, and Joel Kramer, who previously directed second unit for director Wan on The Conjuring (2013) and Death Sentence (2007) and would later work with him again on The Conjuring 2 (2016).

On September 16, the production filmed with Paul Walker and the Kimsey twins, playing his son, Jack, in front of an Atlanta elementary school. Han's funeral scene was filmed at Oakland Cemetery, with extras needed for the scene being "hot, hip and trendy cool types of all ethnicities between the ages of 18 and 45". On the evening of September 19, Lucas Black joined the production for his sole scene with Diesel, in an Atlanta parking garage. Separate scenes with Walker also shot in the same location on the same night, including one half of a phone conversation between his character and Jordana Brewster's.

On October 24, over a month into the film's production, Johnson tweeted he had started shooting for the film after wrapping up on Hercules. Five days later, Diesel posted the first photo of Johnson on the set, in the hospital scene.

=== Death of Paul Walker ===
On November 30, Walker, who portrayed Brian O'Conner, died in a single-vehicle accident. The next day, Universal announced that production would continue after a delay that would allow the filmmakers to rework the film. Walker's death also caused a rewrite on the film's ending depicting Dom and his team's celebration at Neptune's Net, and the destruction of God's Eye. On December 4, Universal put production on hold indefinitely. Wan later confirmed that the film had not been cancelled. On December 22, Diesel announced that the film would be released on April 10, 2015. On February 27, 2014, The Hollywood Reporter reported that filming would resume on April 1, and that the cast and crew had headed to Atlanta to prepare for about eight more weeks of shooting. Principal photography resumed on 31 March and ended on July 10.

=== Stunts ===
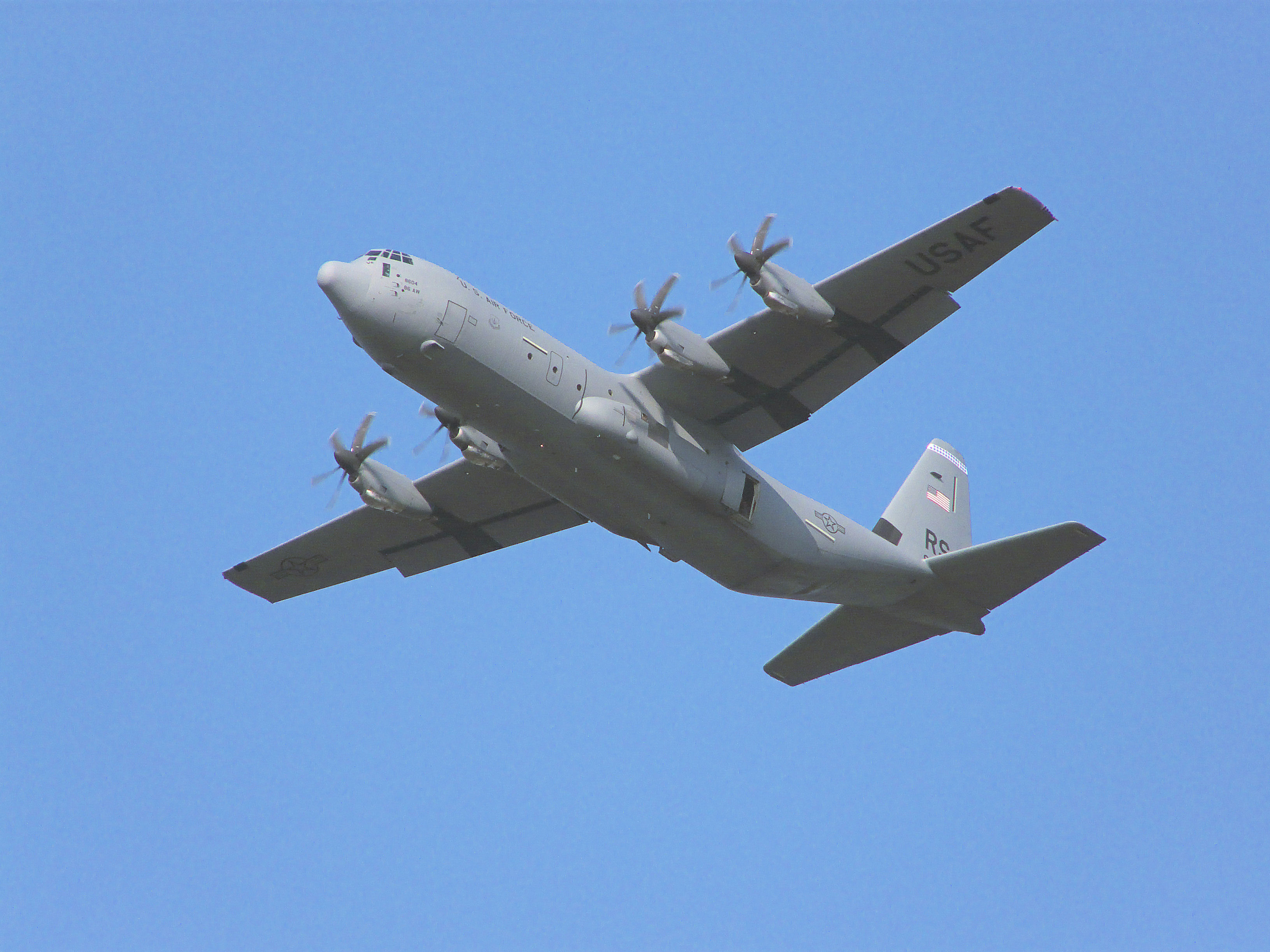
The Lockheed C-130 Hercules was used in the film to carry the vehicles that would drop from 12,000 feet high, above the Sonoran Desert, making cars plummet at a speed of about 130 to 140 miles per hour.

The "airdrop" sequence was conceived by Razatos, who told Business Insider that he wanted to rely more on real stunts rather than CGI because he wanted the whole sequence to "feel real" and fulfill audiences' expectations. The stunt took months of prep-solving problems. Cameras needed to be mounted onto cars in a way that they would not be destroyed when the cars landed, and the crew had to figure out a safe way to get the cars out of the plane. They performed a dry run with a single car falling out of a plane and did this six times. Cars were dropped from a Lockheed C-130 Hercules high above the Arizona desert, but close up shots that show the cars landing on a mountain road were filmed in Colorado. There were two airplanes, flying at a height of 12,000 feet, each dropping two cars apiece. BRS parachutes enabled with GPS were secured to each of the cars before dropping off the C-130 plane. At about 5,000 feet, the parachutes deployed. Over 10 cameras were used for the sequence. In addition to cameras on the ground, there were cameras remotely operated inside the plane and another three mounted outside each car. Additional cameras were on a helicopter, where Razatos was stationed watching monitors. Three skydivers used in the shoot wore helmet cameras to help shoot the sequence from multiple angles. Sky divers would either jump out before cars or after them. While all the cars landed on their drop zones, 70% landed perfectly and 30% did not. For the close-up scenes which show the actors inside their cars, a giant gimbal with a 360-degree range of movement were attached to each of the cars and was filmed against a green screen to reproduce their tumble through the sky. The last part of the scene, which shows the cars hitting the road was shot separately. To get that right, the team set up a pulley system that had cars six to ten feet above the ground. When they were dropped from the cranes, the stuntmen who were sitting in the driver's seats raced their engines at about 35 to 40 miles per hour and slid to the ground at full speed. Those cranes were then later removed from the film with computers. Razatos claims, therefore, that the air drop sequence was "all real" and that it would be "hard to top".

The scene featuring Brian jumping off a bus off a cliff was performed by a stuntman and was all done without any computer graphics. The shooting for this particular sequence along with the scene in which Dom and his team are pursuing to rescue Ramsey almost did not happen due to the absence of tax break in Colorado. The studio originally wanted to shoot the sequence in Georgia which provides tax breaks for film productions, and then add woods in the background later in post-production to which Razatos denied saying, "the audience is going to know [it's CGI] and aren't going to feel good about it." Shooting finally took place in Colorado.

A total of 340 cars were used in the film, and more than 230 cars were destroyed in the making of the film, including several black Mercedes-Benzes, a Ford Crown Victoria, and a Mitsubishi Montero. The film featured the on-screen destruction of a Lykan HyperSport by W Motors, valued at $3.4 million, though the actual car destroyed was a less expensive model made for the film rather than one of the seven actual production HyperSports. The mountain-highway chase scene on Colorado's Monarch Pass proved to be the most damaging sequence with over 40 vehicles being destroyed. Only 10 percent of the action sequences in the film were computer-generated, and even then, much of the CGI was employed simply to erase the wires and other contraptions that were used to film real cars and drivers or to add a background. It took more than 3,500 man-days to complete the various stunts of the film.

=== Redevelopment of Walker's character ===
When I first heard the news, I was shell-shocked like everyone, and it took me days to come to terms with it. And then after that, heartbreaks started sinking in and we realized that Paul [Walker] wasn't going to be around with us anymore moving forward, and it was a really hard one. And finishing the movie was the last thing on my mind at that point. It was more the idea of ... picking up the pieces, going back on set, rallying the team, the cast, and the crew, and as the director, having to put on the brave face and champion and push everyone along. The idea of that was very daunting for me, but it became very apparent to all of us that we needed to finish this movie to honour Paul's legacy and to basically honour his memories ... it was about making this movie for Paul.

— James Wan, director of Furious 7

In January 2014, Time reported that Walker's character, Brian O'Conner, would be retired instead of killed, and that new scenes would be developed in order to allow the franchise to continue without him. To recreate Walker's likeness, the filmmakers hired Peter Jackson's Weta Digital visual effects company (which had previously produced the imagery of Gollum in The Lord of the Rings franchise and Caesar in the Planet of the Apes franchise). Initially, what Weta could do was severely constrained by the quality of the reference materials available for Walker's physical appearance. In April 2014, it was reported that Walker's brothers Caleb and Cody had been hired as stand-ins. Their strong resemblance to their late brother meant the filmmakers could use scans of their bodies instead of recreating Walker's entire body from scratch. The final film showed Walker's face superimposed over the bodies of his brothers or actor John Brotherton in 350 visual effects shots. 260 used a computer-generated face, while 90 repurposed actual footage of Walker's face borrowed from outtakes or older footage.

=== Visual effects and animation ===
Weta Digital, Digital Domain, Scanline VFX, the Moving Picture Company (MPC), and Rodeo FX provided the visual effects and animation for the film.

Weta Digital's major role in the visual effects production was for the reconstruction of Paul Walker's character, Brian O'Conner. Weta's visual effects house completed over 350 shots with visual effects, with a majority of the shots using repurposed footage of Walker's face. Joe Letteri and Martin Hill served as the visual effects supervisors for Weta, while Daniel Barrett served as the animation supervisor. In an interview with Fxguide, Letteri said, "We tried to keep as true to Paul as we could, in whatever way we could." Jay Barton led Digital Domain's visual effects team as the visual effects supervisor, and the studio produced over 800 shots with a team of close to 300 artists; their staff was split between Los Angeles and Vancouver for this process. Jon Cowley and Danielle Plantec led Scanline as the visual effects supervisors at the main studio in Munich, while Mark Curtis served as the visual effects supervisor, and Laura Schultz served as the visual effects producer, at the Moving Picture Company (MPC)'s Canadian studio in Vancouver.

MPC handled the visual effects of the film's final pursuit sequence in Los Angeles, where all of the cars were digitally recreated with computer-generated imagery for fully CGI shots, along with over a hundred in-car blue screen composite shots, which were done by CGI supervisor Bryan Litson; a large portion of MPC's workforce handled the visual effects for the drone, with director James Wan saying he wanted to "create an enigmatic and malevolent character that would provide a constant but elusive threat to our heroes." Inspiration for the drone were drawn by US Military's Global Hawk Drone, an A-10 Warthog, and World War II-era Corsair and Helldivers.

Rodeo FX visual effects supervisor Laurent Spillemaecker, visual effects producer Audrey Boivin, CGI supervisor Sébastien Francoeur, and compositing supervisor Xavier Fourmond—handled the visual effects for two fight sequences in the film: the first being the office fight sequence between Statham and Johnson, with Rodeo using "set extensions and CGI to add flying papers, fire, smoke and explosions," while also adding in "a CGI double for The Rock who's falling from the window"; the CGI double for Johnson was one of many required for the sequence, and the second being the car collision sequence between Diesel and Statham; the studio produced the visual effect of the shattering of the glass coming from the colliding cars.

=== Music ===
The musical score was composed by Brian Tyler, who scored the third, fourth and fifth installments of the series. "There's an emotional component to Fast & Furious 7 that is unique", said Tyler about his experience scoring. "I think people are really going to be amazed by it." A soundtrack album to the film was released by Atlantic Records on March 17, 2015, while Tyler's score was released by Back Lot Music on March 31.

When discussing the creation of the score, Tyler explained: "It was a pleasure to collaborate with James on Furious 7, as he wanted the emotion of the themes to be the primary focus. The music uses modern recording techniques, vintage modular synthesizers, mashed-up beats, drums and tweaked remix elements along with classic film scoring traditions including full orchestra, piano, voice and classical guitar. I am so proud of the movie, and I dedicate the score to the memory of Paul Walker and all the joy he brought."

In describing Tyler's score, Wan remarked, "Brian's amazing score gave this movie life. He did an incredible job of crafting an electrifying score for the bombastic action moments, one that is balanced by the beautiful and emotional themes of the characters that underline the heart of this movie."

Songs featured in the film include: "Go Hard or Go Home" (Wiz Khalifa and Iggy Azalea), "Ride Out" (Kid Ink, Tyga, Wale, YG & Rich Homie Quan), "See You Again" (Wiz Khalifa featuring Charlie Puth), "My Angel" (Prince Royce), "Hamdulillah" (Narcy featuring Shadia Mansour), "Get Low" (Dillon Francis and DJ Snake), "Ay Vamos" (J Balvin featuring Nicky Jam and French Montana), "Tempest" (Deftones), "Meneo" (Fito Blanko) and "Payback" (Juicy J, Kevin Gates, Future and Sage the Gemini).

Wiz Khalifa and Charlie Puth's "See You Again", which plays over the film's ending, and itself a tribute to Paul Walker, received both popular and critical acclaim. It was shortlisted for the Song of the Year for the BBC Music Awards and was nominated for Best Original Song at the 73rd Golden Globe Awards. "See You Again" was the best selling-song of 2015 worldwide, with combined sales and track-equivalent streams of 20.9 million units according to IFPI.

== Release ==
=== Theatrical ===
The film originally scheduled to be released on July 11, 2014, but the film was put on hold following Paul Walker's death in November 2013. In October 2014, Universal revealed that the film was officially titled Furious 7. Leading up to the event, seven-second behind-the-scenes videos were released, titled "7 Seconds of 7".

The film was next scheduled for release on April 10, 2015, but it was announced that the film's release date had been brought forward a week to April 3. The official announcement in change of date was made in July 2014. Furious 7 premiered at the SXSW Film Festival at 12:07 a.m. at Austin's Paramount Theatre on March 16, 2015. For its global premiere at the TCL Chinese Theatre in Los Angeles on April 1, IMAX Corporation installed a new laser projection which was the first such installation in the U.S. and the second worldwide, following The Hobbit: The Battle of the Five Armies (2014), which opened at Scotiabank Theatre in Toronto in December 2014.

=== Home media ===
Furious 7 was released on July 6, 2015, in the UK and was released via DVD and Blu-ray on September 15 in other countries. The Blu-ray edition features an all-new extended edition of 140 minutes long, deleted scenes, stunts, behind-the-scenes, and the music video for Wiz Khalifa and Charlie Puth's "See You Again". The Blu-ray and DVD versions include behind-the-scenes footage of the "Race Wars" scene including rapper Iggy Azalea and the making of the cars featured in the film. In the U.S. and Canada, it sold roughly 2.5 million units on Blu-ray and DVD in its first week of release, making it the highest-selling home entertainment live-action film of 2015. This record was later surpassed by Jurassic World (2015) the following month. Furious 7's home video sales made a revenue of $66.4 million with 4.2 million copies sold, making it the seventh best-selling title of 2015.

== Reception ==
=== Box office ===
| Box office revenue | | | Box office ranking | | Reference |
| United States and Canada | Other territories | Worldwide | All time U.S. and Canada | All time worldwide | Reference |
| $353,007,020 | $1,162,335,437 | $1,515,342,457 | No. 79 | No. 14 | |

Furious 7 grossed $353 million in the United States and Canada and $1.163 billion in other countries, for a worldwide total of $1.515 billion, against a production budget of $190–250 million. It was the third-highest-grossing film of 2015 and the fourth-highest-grossing film of all time. Furious 7 was also the fastest film to reach the $1 billion mark at the time, doing so in 17 days. It also became the first film to pass $1 million in 4DX admissions worldwide. Deadline Hollywood calculated the film's net profit as $354 million, accounting for production budgets, marketing, talent participations, and other costs; box office grosses and home media revenues placed it fifth on their list of "Most Valuable Blockbusters".

Worldwide, Furious 7 was released across 810 IMAX theaters, which was the largest worldwide rollout in IMAX's history, Its worldwide opening of $397.6 million was the second-highest opening of all time. The film had an IMAX opening weekend total of $20.8 million.

==== North America ====
Predictions for the opening weekend of Furious 7 in the United States and Canada were continuously revised upwards, starting from $115 million to $150 million. It opened on Friday, April 3, 2015, across 4,004 theaters, including 365 IMAX theaters, which made it the widest opening for the Fast and Furious film and Universal's widest opening release ever (until first surpassed by Jurassic World and Minions) and earned $67.4 million, marking the tenth-biggest opening day. The film's Friday gross included a $15.8 million late-night run (which began at 7 p.m.), from 3,069 theaters, marking Universal's highest late-night run, of which $2.2 million came from IMAX showings, marking the third largest IMAX preview gross ever. Based on pure Friday gross (with the omission of revenues from Thursday shows), it earned $51.5 million, marking the fifth-biggest of all time. Through Sunday, April 5, it had an opening weekend total of $147.1 million. This opening broke the records for the highest weekend debuts in April and for the Easter Weekend, both of which were later overtaken by Avengers: Infinity War and Batman v Superman: Dawn of Justice, respectively. It earned an IMAX opening weekend total of $13.3 million, marking the second-biggest of all time for a 2D movie. Premium large format comprised 8% ($11.5 million) of the total opening gross from 400 PLF screens, which is the biggest 2D PLF opening.

In its second weekend, the film expanded to 4,022 theaters, thereby breaking its own record of being the widest Universal Pictures release ever, and earned an estimated $59.6 million, declining by 60%, which is the third best second weekend holdover for a pre-summer film release. It became the highest-grossing film in the Fast & Furious franchise, doing so only in ten days (the previous record which was held by Fast & Furious 6 took fifteen weeks to reach its entire lifetime gross of $238.67 million). It also set the record for the biggest second-weekend April gross.

==== Other territories ====
Furious 7 opened on April 1, 2015, in 12 countries, earning $16.9 million (including previews from 22 countries). It opened in 33 more countries on April 2, for a total of 45 countries, earning $43 million from 8,407 screens, marking Universal Pictures overseas' highest-grossing Thursday ever, and for a two-day total of $60 million. It added 20 more countries on April 3, earning $59.2 million from 9,935 screens in 63 countries, for a three-day total of $120.6 million. On April 5, it earned a 4-day opening weekend total of $250.4 million from 10,683 screens in 64 countries, which is the fourth-highest international opening ever, in all which it reached first place at the box office. It earned an IMAX opening weekend total of $7.5 million from 175 IMAX screens, breaking the record for the biggest April IMAX gross, previously held by Captain America: The Winter Soldier (2014) ($6.43 million). It set opening weekend records in 29 countries including Argentina, Brazil, Chile, Colombia, Egypt, Malaysia, Mexico, Middle East, Romania, Taiwan, Thailand, Venezuela and Vietnam. In its second weekend, it held the top spot and fell gradually by 20.4% to $198.7 million (including China's opening day gross) from 18,374 screens in 66 territories as a result of minor competition, and remaining at number one in all 63 territories where it was released the previous week. It added three new countries in its second weekend; China, Russia and Poland. The film earned $167.9 million in its third weekend, which topped the box office outside of North America for three consecutive weekends.

The film was a massive box office hit in China. It opened there on April 12 and set an all-time midnight run record with $8.05 million and an opening day record with $68.8 million. Its opening day included a record-breaking $5 million from IMAX run (also breaking Transformers: Age of Extinction's (2014) former record of $3.4 million). Through its opening week (April 12–19), it earned $245.9 million. For the weekend alone, it took in $88.7 million from 5,454 screens (Friday to Sunday) and $182.4 million (Monday to Sunday) at the Chinese box office. It grossed CN¥1 billion in five days—the fastest time in which that has been achieved—and soon became the highest-grossing foreign film ever in China. In 15 days, its gross in China surpassed those in Canada and the United States and became the first film in China to make more than 2 billion renminbi. Its success has been credited to China Film Group Corporation, the state-owned film distributor, which had invested considerably in the film, reportedly taking a 10% stake. In Latin America, it became the second highest-grossing film ($200 million), the first time Universal has reached the milestone and the second film in history to earn more than $200 million after The Avengers (2012). In total earnings, the largest countries outside the U.S. and Canada are China ($391.2 million), the United Kingdom ($60 million), Mexico ($51.7 million), Brazil ($46.6 million), Germany ($42.8 million) and India ($24 million). It grossed a total of $39 million in IMAX ticket sales in China, the biggest ever in the market.

=== Critical response ===
Furious 7 received positive reviews from critics for its poignant tribute to Walker. The review aggregator website Rotten Tomatoes reported an approval rating of 81% with an average score of 7.70/10, based on 279 reviews, the highest-rated film in the franchise to date. The website's critical consensus reads, "Serving up a fresh round of over-the-top thrills while adding unexpected dramatic heft, Furious 7 keeps the franchise moving in more ways than one." Metacritic, which uses a weighted average, assigned the film a score of 67 out of 100 based on 50 critics, indicating "generally favorable reviews". It is the highest-rated Fast & Furious film on both websites. Audiences polled by CinemaScore gave the film an average grade of "A" on an A+ to F scale.

The film received highly positive reviews upon its secret screening at the South by Southwest film festival on March 16, 2015. Ramin Setoodeh of Variety noted that fans began lining up outside four hours before the film was scheduled to start. The film closed with a tribute to Walker, which left many in the theater "holding back tears". Wesley Morris wrote, "Who would have thought that a series addicted to the high of movement could also summon a solemnity that leaves you moved?" A. O. Scott of The New York Times said, "Furious 7 extends its predecessors' inclusive, stereotype-resistant ethic. Compared to almost any other large-scale, big-studio enterprise, the Furious brand practices a slick, no-big-deal multiculturalism, and nods to both feminism and domestic traditionalism." John DeFore of The Hollywood Reporter criticized the film however, describing it as "stupidly diverting", saying the running time was "overinflated"; he compared watching the film to a morbid game, in addition to criticizing the screenplay.

=== Accolades ===
Accolades received by Furious 7
| Award | Date of ceremony | Category | Recipient(s) | Result | Ref. |
|---|---|---|---|---|---|
| African-American Film Critics Association Awards | February 10, 2016 | Best Song | Wiz Khalifa and Charlie Puth for "See You Again" | Won | |
| Billboard Music Awards | May 22, 2016 | Top Soundtrack | Furious 7 | Nominated | |
| Black Reel Awards | February 18, 2016 | Best Original or Adapted Song | Wiz Khalifa and Charlie Puth for "See You Again" | Won | |
| Critics' Choice Movie Awards | January 17, 2016 | Best Action Movie | Furious 7 | Nominated | |
| Critics' Choice Movie Awards | January 17, 2016 | Best Song | "See You Again" | Won | |
| ETC Bollywood Business Awards | January 16, 2016 | Most Successful Foreign Film | Furious 7 | Won | |
| Georgia Film Critics Association Awards | January 8, 2016 | Best Original Song | DJ Frank E, Andrew Cedar, Charlie Puth, and Wiz Khalifa for "See You Again" | Won | |
| Golden Globe Awards | January 10, 2016 | Best Original Song | Justin Franks, Andrew Cedar, Charlie Puth, and Wiz Khalifa for "See You Again" | Nominated | |
| Golden Trailer Awards | May 6, 2015 | Best of Show | "Family" (AV Squad) | Won | |
| Golden Trailer Awards | May 6, 2015 | Best Action | "Family" (AV Squad) | Won | |
| Golden Trailer Awards | May 6, 2015 | Best Music | "Drop Teaser" (AV Squad) | Nominated | |
| Golden Trailer Awards | May 6, 2015 | GTA 16 & Rentrak Best Opening Weekend Award | Furious 7 | Won | |
| Golden Trailer Awards | May 6, 2015 | Best Sound Editing | "Drop Teaser" (AV Squad) | Nominated | |
| Golden Trailer Awards | May 6, 2015 | Best Action TV Spot | "Fast" (AV Squad) | Won | |
| Golden Trailer Awards | May 6, 2015 | Best Music TV Spot | "Fast" (AV Squad) | Nominated | |
| Grammy Awards | February 15, 2016 | Best Song Written for Visual Media | Wiz Khalifa and Charlie Puth for "See You Again" | Nominated | |
| Guild of Music Supervisors Awards | January 21, 2016 | Best Song Written and/or Recorded Created for a Film | DJ Frank E, Charlie Puth, Wiz Khalifa, and Andrew Cedar for "See You Again" | Won | |
| Hollywood Film Awards | November 1, 2015 | Hollywood Blockbuster Award | Furious 7 | Won | |
| Hollywood Film Awards | November 1, 2015 | Hollywood Song Award | Wiz Khalifa and Charlie Puth for "See You Again" | Won | |
| Hollywood Music in Media Awards | November 11, 2015 | Best Original Song in a Feature Film | Justin Franks, Andrew Cedar, Charlie Puth, and Wiz Khalifa for "See You Again" | Won | |
| Houston Film Critics Society Awards | January 9, 2016 | Best Original Song | "See You Again" | Nominated | |
| Make-Up Artists and Hair Stylists Guild Awards | February 20, 2016 | Best Contemporary Make-Up in a Feature-Length Motion Picture | James MacKinnon, Autumn Butler, and Roxy D'Alonzo | Won | |
| Make-Up Artists and Hair Stylists Guild Awards | February 20, 2016 | Best Contemporary Hair Styling in a Feature-Length Motion Picture | Linda D. Flowers, Jennifer Santiago, and Lisa Ann Wilson | Nominated | |
| MTV Movie Awards | April 10, 2016 | Best Action Performance | Vin Diesel | Nominated | |
| MTV Movie Awards | April 10, 2016 | Ensemble Cast | Furious 7 | Nominated | |
| People's Choice Awards | January 6, 2016 | Favorite Movie | Furious 7 | Won | |
| People's Choice Awards | January 6, 2016 | Favorite Action Movie | Furious 7 | Won | |
| People's Choice Awards | January 6, 2016 | Favorite Action Movie Actor | Vin Diesel | Nominated | |
| People's Choice Awards | January 6, 2016 | Favorite Action Movie Actress | Michelle Rodriguez | Nominated | |
| Premios Juventud | July 14, 2016 | Favorite Movie | Furious 7 | Won | |
| Satellite Awards | February 21, 2016 | Best Original Song | "See You Again" | Nominated | |
| Saturn Awards | June 22, 2016 | Best Action or Adventure Film | Furious 7 | Won | |
| Saturn Awards | June 22, 2016 | Best Editing | Christian Wagner, Dylan Highsmith, Kirk Morri, and Leigh Folsom Boyd | Nominated | |
| Saturn Awards | June 22, 2016 | Best DVD or Blu-ray Special Edition Release | Furious 7 (Extended Edition) | Nominated | |
| Screen Actors Guild Awards | January 30, 2016 | Outstanding Performance by a Stunt Ensemble in a Motion Picture | Furious 7 | Nominated | |
| Screen Nation Film and Television Awards | March 19, 2016 | Female Performance in Film | Nathalie Emmanuel (Note: Also for Maze Runner: The Scorch Trials (2015)) | Won | |
| St. Louis Film Critics Association Awards | December 20, 2015 | Best Song | "See You Again" | Runner-up | |
| St. Louis Film Critics Association Awards | December 20, 2015 | Best Scene | "Paul Walker farewell" | Nominated | |
| Teen Choice Awards | August 16, 2015 | Choice Movie: Action | Furious 7 | Won | |
| Teen Choice Awards | August 16, 2015 | Choice Movie Actor: Action | Vin Diesel | Nominated | |
| Teen Choice Awards | August 16, 2015 | Choice Movie Actor: Action | Paul Walker | Won | |
| Teen Choice Awards | August 16, 2015 | Choice Movie Actress: Action | Michelle Rodriguez | Nominated | |
| Teen Choice Awards | August 16, 2015 | Choice Movie Actress: Action | Jordana Brewster | Nominated | |
| Teen Choice Awards | August 16, 2015 | Choice Movie: Villain | Jason Statham | Nominated | |
| Teen Choice Awards | August 16, 2015 | Choice Movie: Chemistry | Vin Diesel, Paul Walker, Michelle Rodriguez, Tyrese Gibson, Dwayne Johnson, and Ludacris | Nominated | |
| Teen Choice Awards | August 16, 2015 | Choice Music: Song from a Movie or TV Show | Wiz Khalifa and Charlie Puth for "See You Again" | Won | |
| Visual Effects Society Awards | February 2, 2016 | Outstanding Visual Effects in a Photoreal Feature | Mike Wassel, Karen Murphy, Martin Hill, Kevin McIlwain, and Dan Sudick | Nominated | |

== Sequel ==
The Fate of the Furious (2017) serves as the start of a next trilogy of films that includes F9 (2021) and Fast X (2023). An eleventh and final mainline film, Fast Forever (2028), is in production.

== See also ==
- List of films featuring drones
- List of films featuring surveillance
- Forza Horizon 2

== Works cited ==
- Universal Pictures. "Universal Pictures 'Furious 7' Starring Vin Diesel, Paul Walker, & Dwayne Johnson In Theaters April 3, 2015". Archived from the original on September 19, 2015 – via The Videography Blog.
