= Qatar Motor Show =

Annual Qatari auto show

Coordinates: 25.3277°N 51.5321°E

GIMS Qatar
- Status: Active
- Venue: Doha Exhibition & Convention Center
- Location: Doha
- Country: Qatar
- Years active: 2011–2018, 2023–present
- Inaugurated: 2011
- Previous event: 5-14 October 2023
- Next event: November 2025 (last held)
- Website: genevamotorshow.com

Logo of the former Qatar Motor Show

The GIMS Qatar, formerly the Qatar Motor Show is a biennial international motor trade show held in Doha, Qatar, at the Doha Exhibition & Convention Center. It began in January 2011 as an annual event with 90,000 attendees. In 2012, it hosted 120,000 visitors from around the Persian Gulf. It features new models as well as supercars, concept cars and custom cars from various style centers and automotive designers. These are test-driven by and demonstrated to visitors. The last Qatar Motor Show was held in 2018. The event was revived by organisers of Geneva International Motor Show in October 2023 as a biennial event.

== 2011 ==
Notable unveiled vehicles included:

- Autostudi C-Sport Qatar Concept
- Lamborghini Gallardo LP 560-4 Bicolore
- Lexus LX570 Invader L60
- Porsche Panamera Exclusive Middle East Edition
- Volkswagen XL1 Concept
- Volkswagen Race Touareg 3 Qatar Concept
- Volkswagen Touareg V8 TDI Gold Edition Concept

== 2012 ==
Notable unveiled vehicles included:

- Bugatti Veyron Grand Sport Roadster "Middle East Edition"
- Ford Focus (facelift)
- I.DE.A Futura
- UP Design Vittoria Concept

== 2013 ==
The 2013 show took place between 29 January and 2 February. Notable events included Gruppo Bertone celebrating the company's 100 year anniversary, and the unveiling of what some sources called the first Arab-designed "supercar".

Notable unveiled vehicles included:

- Audi R8 V10 Plus
- Brabus Widestar 800
- W Motors LykanHypersport

== 2025 ==
The Geneva edition of the show ended after 2024. The organisers said the show would only continue in Doha. This event happened in Doha, Qatar from 20-22 November 2025.
