= Porsche flat-six engine =

Porsche flat-6 engine
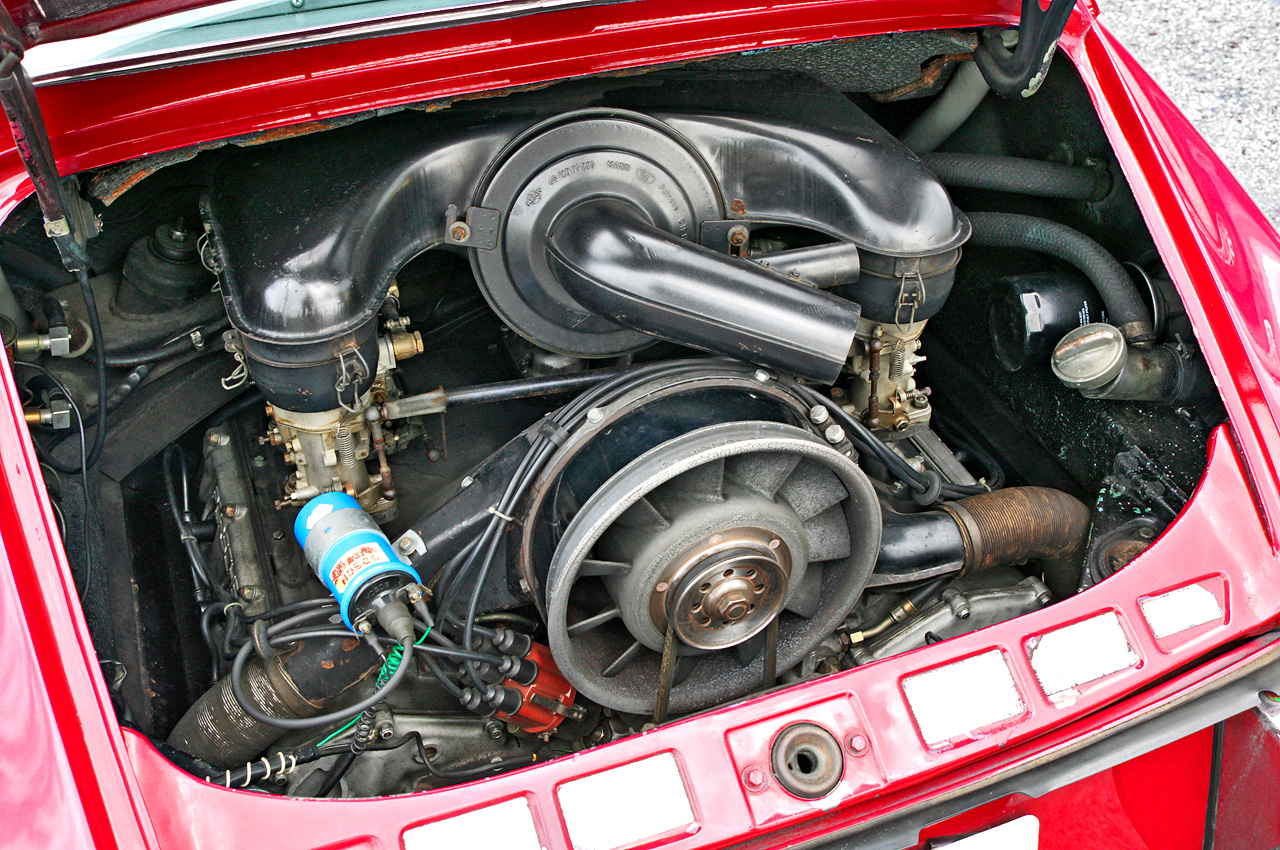

Overview
- Manufacturer: Porsche
- Production: 1963–present

Layout
- Configuration: Flat-6
- Displacement: 2.0–4.2 L (122–256 cu in)
- Cylinder bore: 80–102.7 mm (3.1–4.0 in)
- Piston stroke: 66–80.4 mm (2.6–3.2 in)
- Valvetrain: 12-valve or 24-valve, SOHC/DOHC, two-valves per cylinder or four-valves per cylinder

Combustion
- Turbocharger: Yes (some models)
- Fuel system: Mechanical fuel injection Carburetor; Direct fuel injection
- Fuel type: Gasoline
- Oil system: Dry sump
- Cooling system: Air-cooled; Water-cooled

Output
- Power output: 110–850 hp (82–634 kW)
- Torque output: 119–730 lb⋅ft (161–990 N⋅m)

Dimensions
- Dry weight: 387–507 lb (176–230 kg)

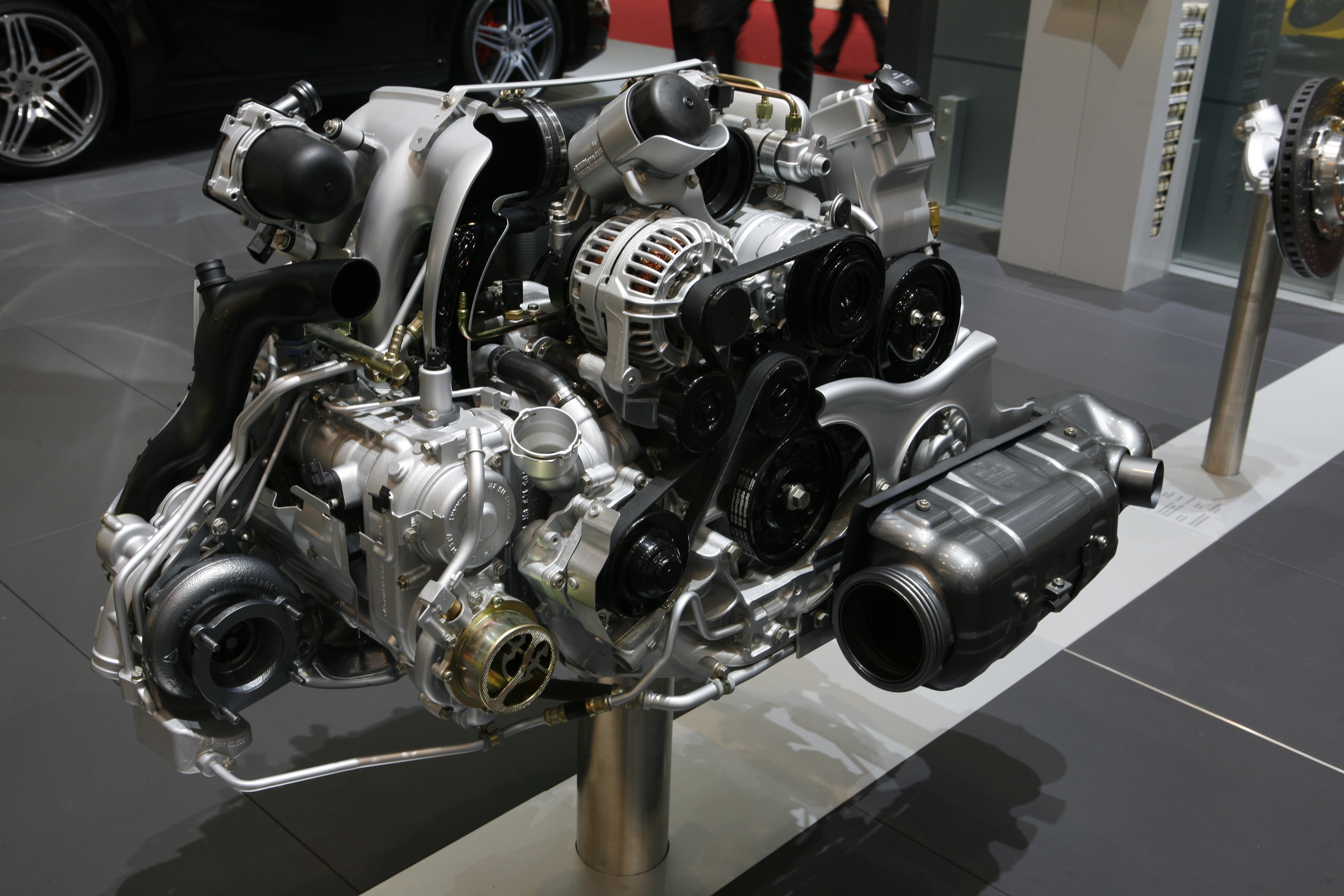
Porsche flat-6 engine

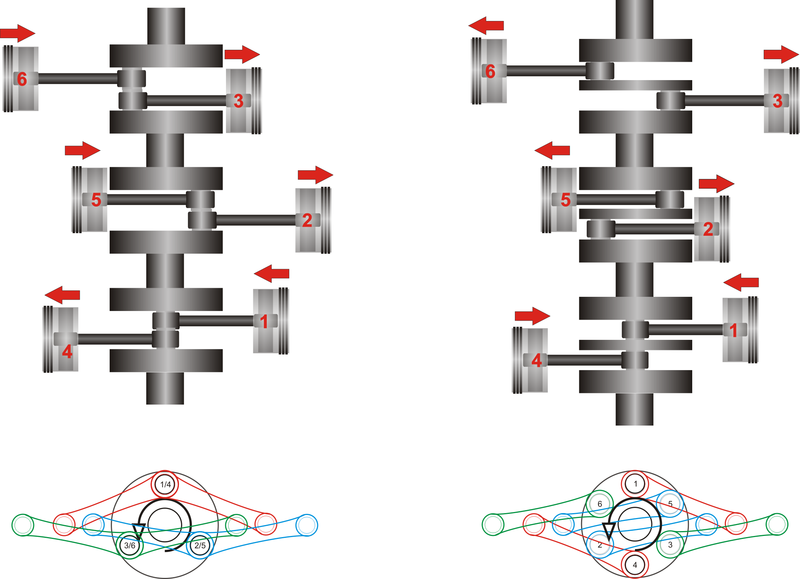
Porsche F6 use the boxer layout (right side), not the V-180° (left)

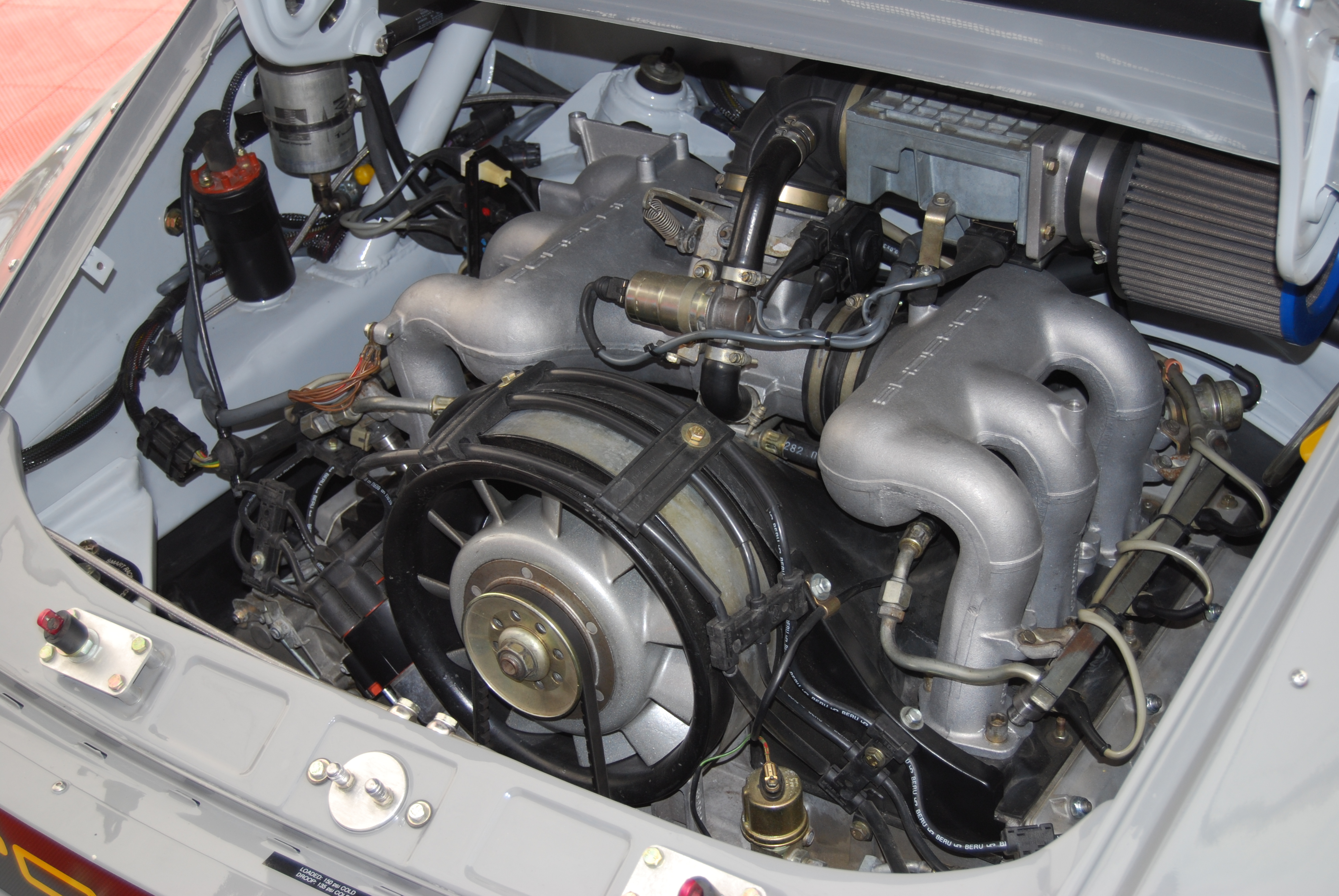
Flat-6 engine in an older air-cooled 911

The Porsche flat-six engine series is a line of mechanically similar flat-six boxer engines, produced by Porsche for over 60 consecutive years, since introduced in the 1963 rear-engine Porsche 911, and as mid-rear mounted racing engine in the 1966 Porsche 906 Carrera 6, each with 2000cc.

All Porsche F6 boxer engines, naturally aspirated or turbocharged, remained air-cooled with additional oil cooling until in the late 1970s some turbo-charged endurance racing engines were constructed partly or completely water-cooled to be mainly used in the Porsche 956/962C sportscar racers in the 1980s. Related designs are still in use in the high-performance GT3/GT2 range. The regular 911 models used the air-cooled F6 until the 1990s Porsche 993, and starting with the Porsche 996 are fitted with a simpler and cheaper range of water-cooled engines less suited for racing.

The F6 engine is an evolution of the air-cooled flat-four Boxer engine designs by Ferdinand Porsche used in the original 1930 Volkswagen Beetle and continued by Porsche in the Porsche 356 into the 1960s.

1967 Porsche 911R

2006 Porsche Cayman S

The flat-six engine is most often associated with their 911 model, Porsche's flagship rear-engined sports car which has used flat-six engines exclusively since 1963, as the 911-bodies sold with the outgoing 356 F4 engine were called Porsche 912.

In April 2011, Porsche announced the third generation of the 997 GT3 RS with an enlarged 4.0-litre engine having a power output of 500 PS (368 kW; 493 hp). The naturally-aspirated 4.0-litre flat-six engine (the largest engine displacement offered in a street-legal 911) was introduced with their 2011 911 (997) GT3 RS 4.0, in 2011. The engine itself uses the crankshaft from the RSR with increased stroke dimensions (from 76.4 mm to 80.4 mm). This change increased the power output to 500 PS (368 kW; 493 hp) at 8,250 rpm and 460 N⋅m (339 lbf⋅ft) of torque at 5,750 rpm. giving it a power-to-weight ratio of 365 hp per ton. Only 600 cars were built. At 493 hp (368 kW), the engine is one of the most powerful six-cylinder naturally aspirated engines in any production car with a 123.25 hp (92 kW) per litre output.

Other Porsche models that use flat-six engines are the 1970–1972 Porsche 914/6 (mid-engine), the 1986–1993 Porsche 959 (rear-engine), and the 1996–2021 Porsche Boxster/Cayman (mid-engine).

The Porsche 962 sports prototype also used a twin-turbocharged flat-six engine.

== Applications ==
=== Road cars ===
==== Porsche ====
- 1963–present Porsche 911
  - 1963–1989 original Porsche 911
  - 1989–1993 Porsche 964
  - 1994–1998 Porsche 993
  - 1997–2006 Porsche 996
  - 2004–2013 Porsche 997
  - 2011–2019 Porsche 991
  - 2019–present Porsche 992
- 1970–1972 Porsche 914/6
- 1986–1993 Porsche 959
- 1996–present Porsche Boxster
- 2005–present Porsche Cayman

==== Others ====
- 2014–2018 W Motors Lykan HyperSport
- 2019–present W Motors Fenyr SuperSport

=== Race cars ===
- Porsche 914/6 GT
- Porsche 934
- Porsche 934/5
- Porsche 935
- Porsche 936
- Porsche 956
- Porsche 961
- Porsche 962
- Porsche WSC-95
- Porsche 911 GT1
- Porsche 911 GT2
- Porsche 911 GT3
- Porsche 911 RSR
- Porsche 911 RSR-19
- Riley MkXI/Riley MkXX/Riley MkXXII/Riley MkXXVI
