= W Motors Lykan HyperSport =

Lebanese limited production sports car

Lykan HyperSport
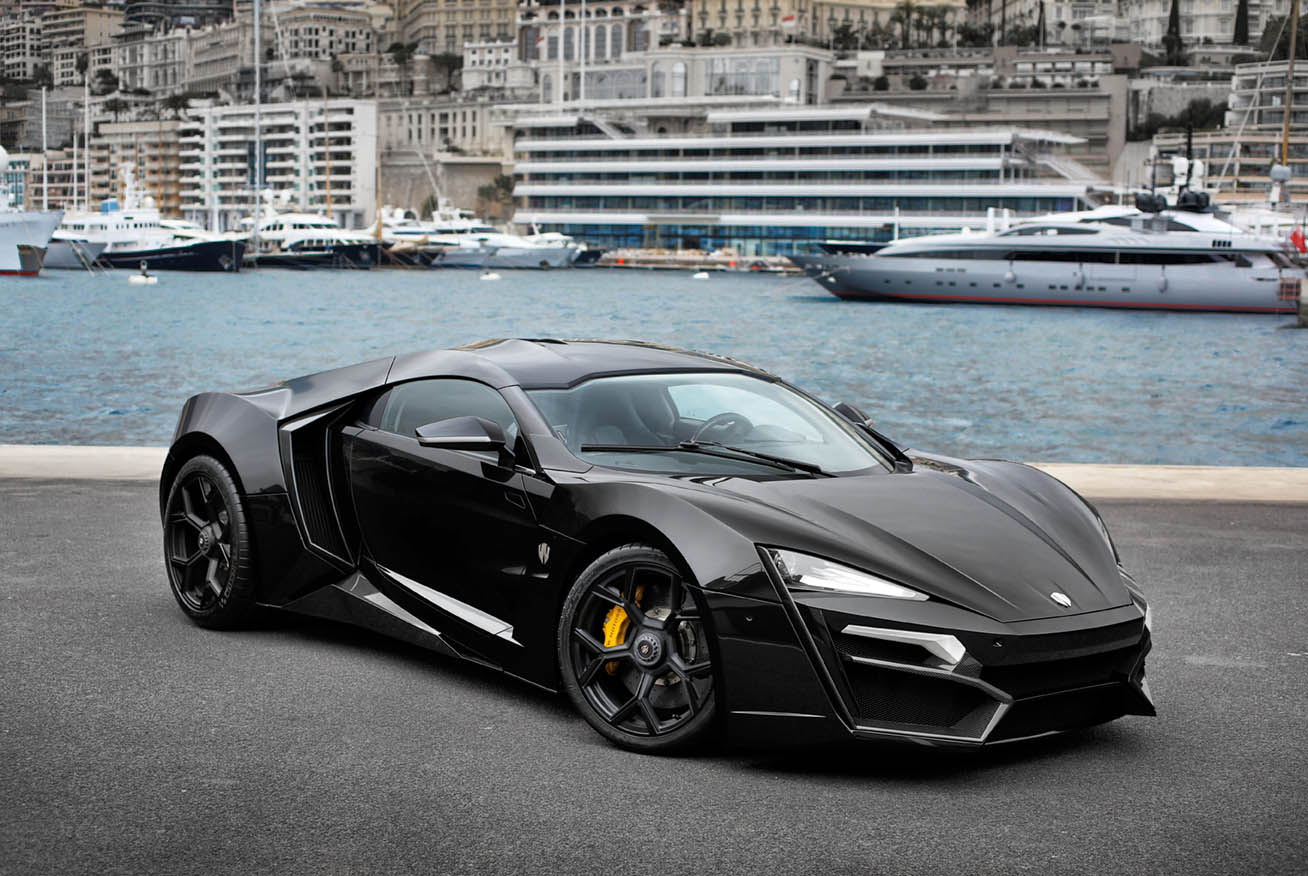
- The Lykan HyperSport in Monaco

Overview
- Manufacturer: W Motors
- Production: 2013–2018
- Model years: 2014–2018
- Assembly: Jebel Ali, Dubai, United Arab Emirates
- Designer: Ralph Debbas; Anthony Jannarelly; Benoit Fraylon

Body and chassis
- Class: Sports car (S)
- Body style: 2-door coupé
- Layout: Rear mid-engine, rear-wheel-drive

Powertrain
- Engine: 3.7 L CTR38 twin-turbocharged flat-6
- Transmission: 6-speed sequential manual 7-speed dual-clutch

Dimensions
- Wheelbase: 2,625 mm (103 in)
- Length: 4,480 mm (176 in)
- Width: 1,944 mm (77 in)
- Height: 1,170 mm (46 in)
- Kerb weight: 1,380 kg (3,042 lb)

Chronology
- Successor: W Motors Fenyr SuperSport

The Lykan HyperSport is a limited-production sports car manufactured by W Motors, a United Arab Emirates-based company, founded in 2012 in Lebanon with the collaboration of Lebanese and Italian engineers. It is the first sports car to be designed indigenously in the Middle East; however, the bodywork, chassis and engine were all produced in Germany and assembled in Italy.

The production of the car was limited to a total of seven units. The first pre-production Lykan HyperSport was unveiled to the public at the Qatar Motor Show in February 2013.

== Pricing and sales ==
At US$3.4 million, the Lykan HyperSport was the third most expensive production car at the time of its production. The HyperSport is the first car to have headlights with embedded jewels; they contain titanium LED blades with 440 platinum diamonds (15cts); although buyers had a selection of rubies, diamonds, yellow diamonds, and sapphires to be integrated into the vehicle's headlights at purchase based on the colour choice. The car also uses a holographic display system on the centre console with interactive motion features, as well as gold stitching on the seats. In June 2015, the Abu Dhabi Police purchased a Lykan HyperSport.

== Specifications ==
=== Exterior ===
The Lykan HyperSport features rear hinged, upward opening doors which W Motors describes as patented "reverse dihedral doors".

=== Powertrain ===
The Lykan HyperSport is powered by a 3.7 L (3,746 cc) twin-turbocharged flat-6 engine developed by Ruf Automobile, producing a (claimed) maximum power output of 552 kW (740 hp) at 7,100 rpm and 960 N⋅m (708 lb⋅ft) of torque at 4,000 rpm. There have been no independent tests of the power output of the vehicle.

=== Transmission ===
The Lykan HyperSport was available with either a 6-speed sequential manual or a 7-speed dual-clutch PDK transmission. The transmission is paired with a limited-slip differential and is mounted longitudinally at the rear of the car.

=== Suspension ===
The Lykan HyperSport uses a MacPherson strut suspension on the front axle, and multi-link suspension with horizontal coil over shock absorbers at the rear axle. Anti-roll bars are also installed at both axles.

=== Wheels ===
The Lykan HyperSport is equipped with forged aluminium wheels with diameters of 19 inches at the front and 20 inches at the rear. The tyres are Pirelli P Zeros with codes of 255/35 ZR 19 for the front and 335/30 ZR 20 for the rear. The brakes have ventilated ceramic composite discs, with a diameter of 380 mm each and use six-piston aluminium callipers at the front and rear.

== Performance ==
The manufacturer claims a top speed of 395 km/h (245 mph), depending on the gear ratio setup. There was a demonstration of the car by W Motors in 2013 in Dubai, in which they claim to have recorded the car's performance. No independent tests have been conducted, and there is no corroborating evidence that supports any performance claims made about the vehicle.

== Film version ==
A Lykan HyperSport was featured in the film Furious 7. The film's car coordinator Dennis McCarthy explained in an interview that the Lykan HyperSports used in the film were not production models but purpose-built by W Motors for the film using the same moulds, but cheaper material (fibreglass instead of carbon fibre) and a simpler chassis. Of the ten produced for the film, one was returned to W Motors and is displayed in their showroom. The other nine were destroyed during the course of filming.

Several Lykan HyperSport replicas were also used in the 2018 British Fast & Furious Live show. One of these, a hollow fiberglass shell fired out of an air cannon, was purchased and imported to the United States by Sam Hard (Hard Up Garage) and Ed Bolian (VINwiki). It was built into a drivable car using an extensively modified Porsche Boxster chassis by Casey Putsch and Genius Garage under license from W Motors, with the build documented on YouTube. Putsch sold this replica Lykan at auction for $175,000 in 2022. At the time of the sale, the car was only certified for track use because its side windows and windshield wiper had not been fabricated.

== Gallery ==
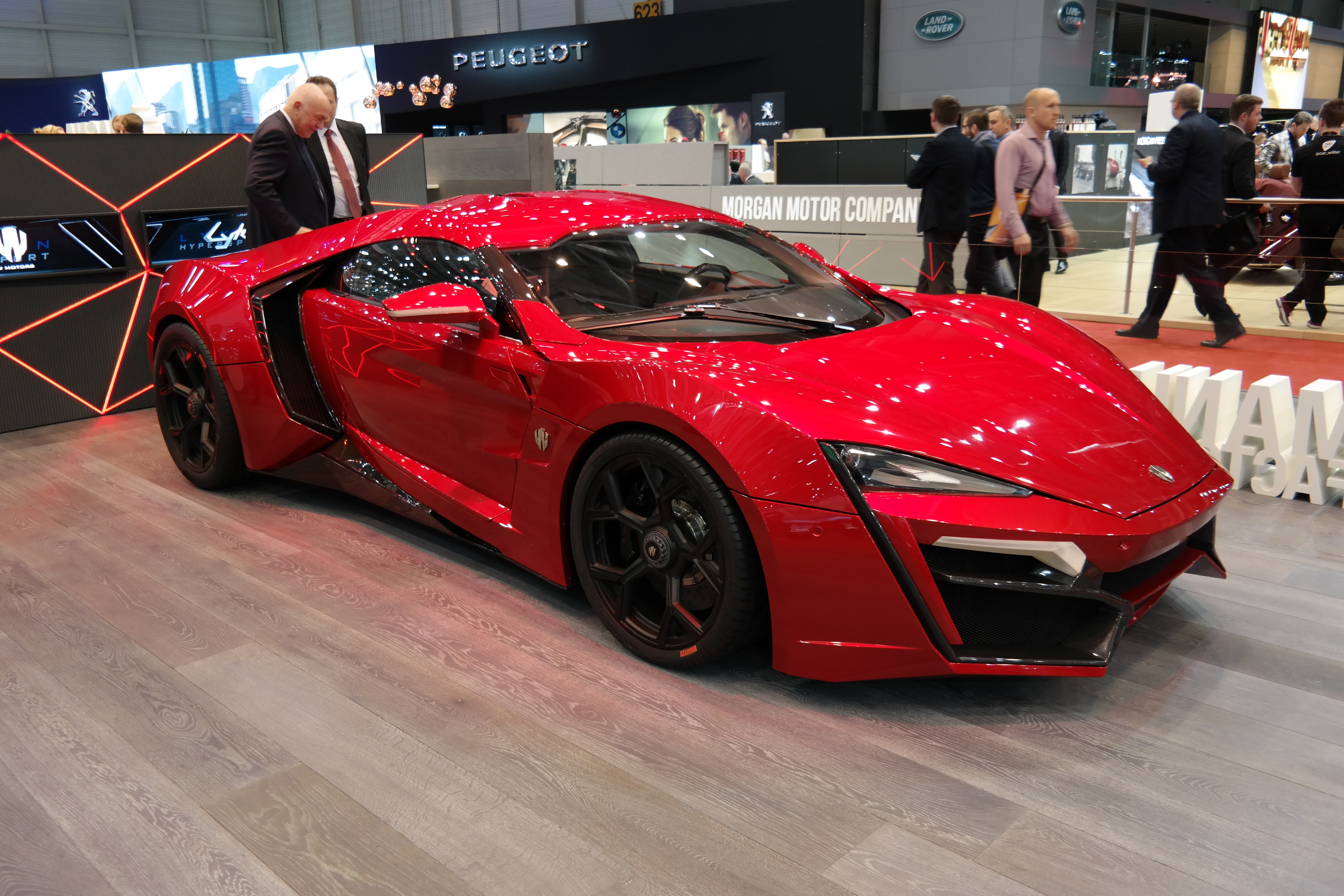
Lykan HyperSport at the 2016 Geneva Motor Show.

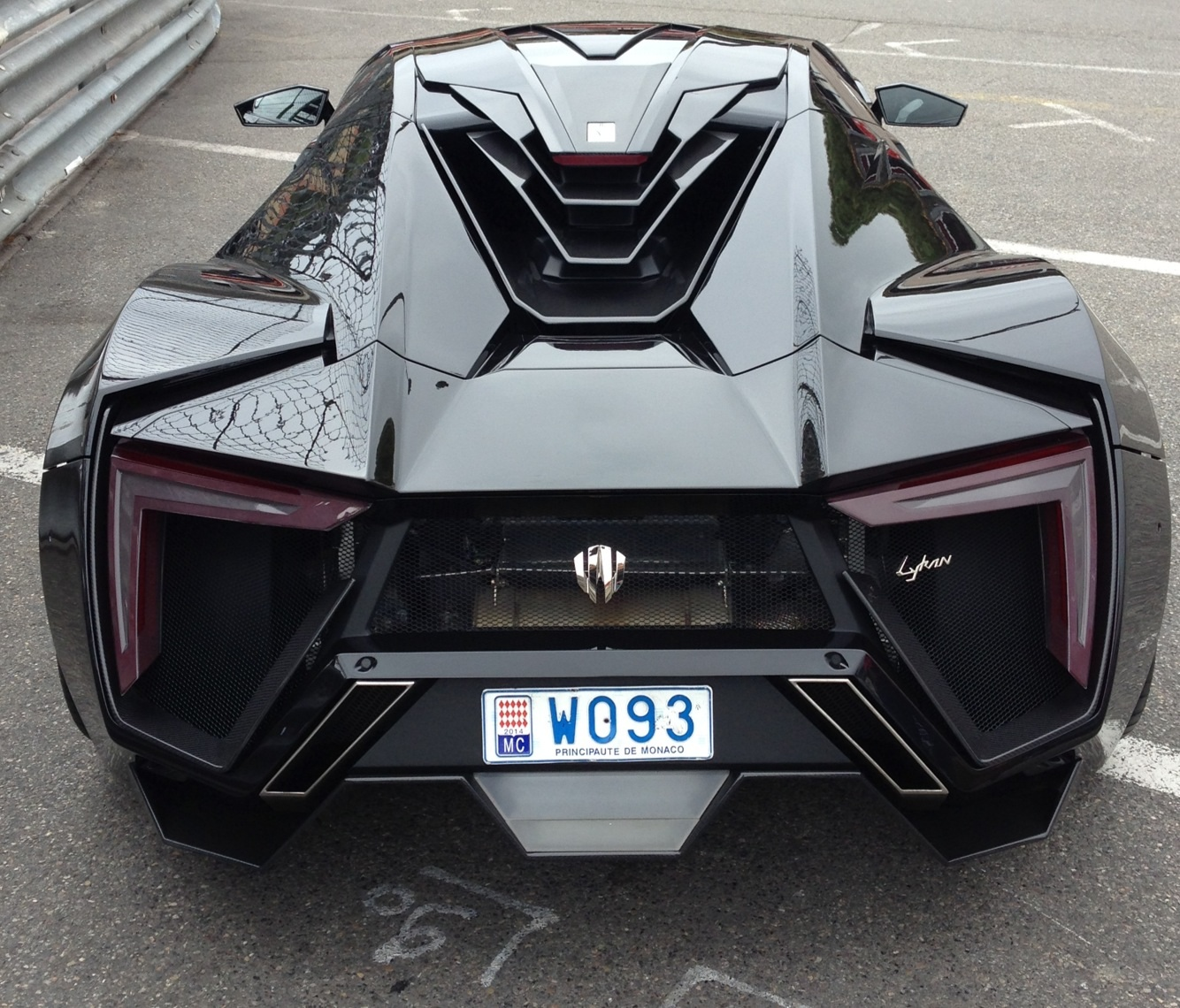
Rear view.

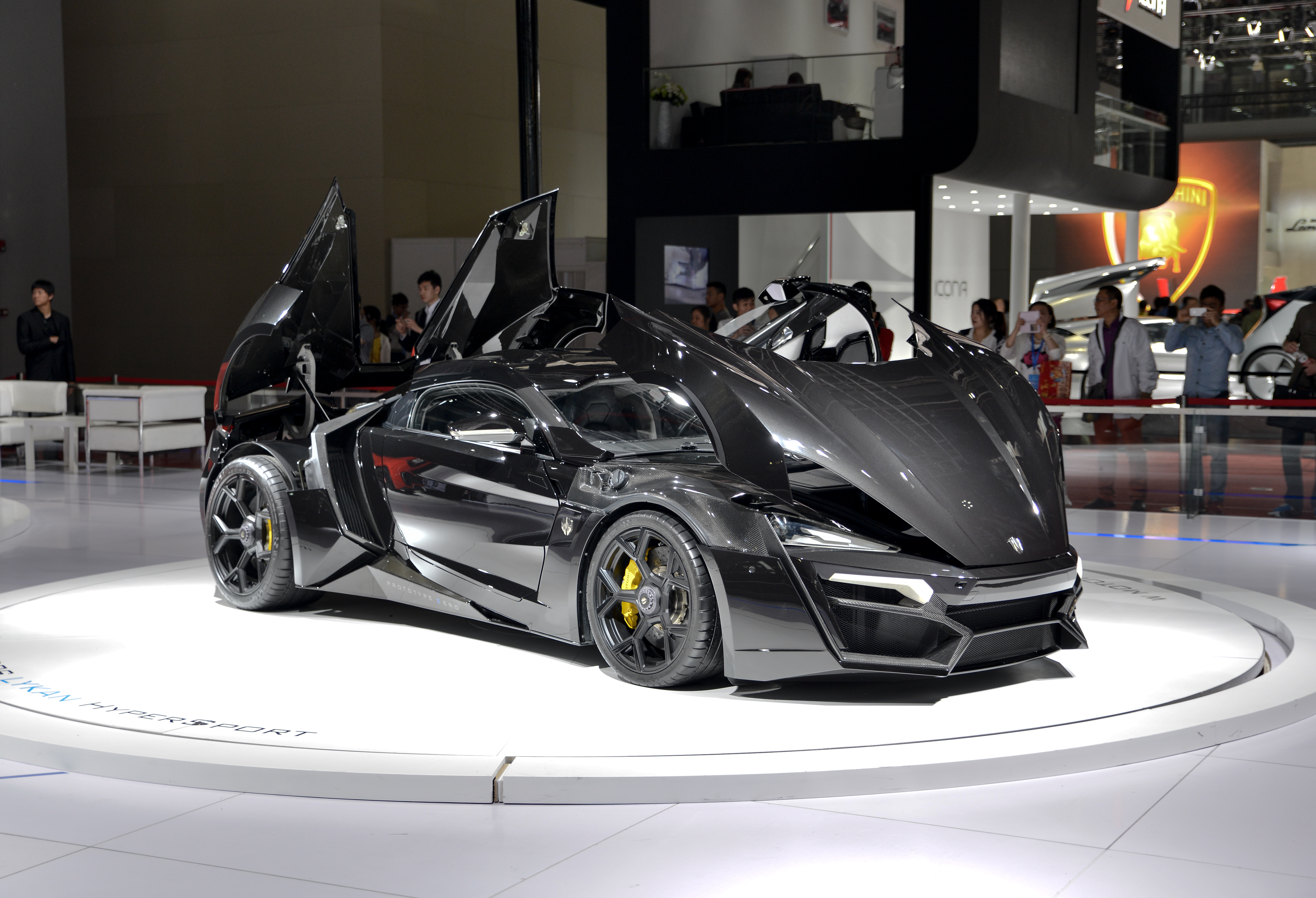
Lykan Hypersport at Auto Shanghai 2015

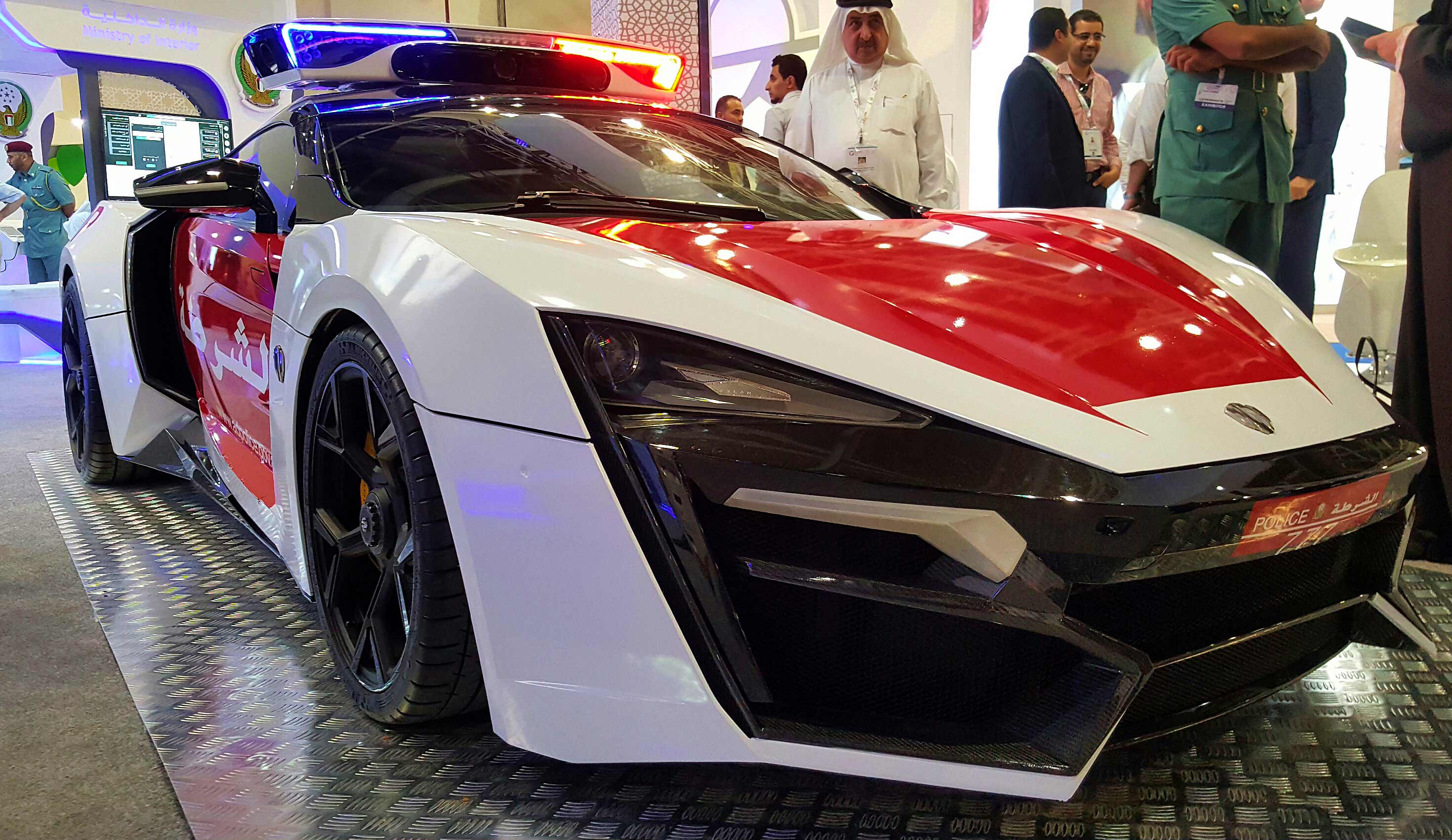
Lykan Hypersport - Abu-Dhabi Police Edition on display at GITEX 2015
