= W Motors Fenyr SuperSport =

Limited production sports car manufactured by W Motors

Fenyr SuperSport
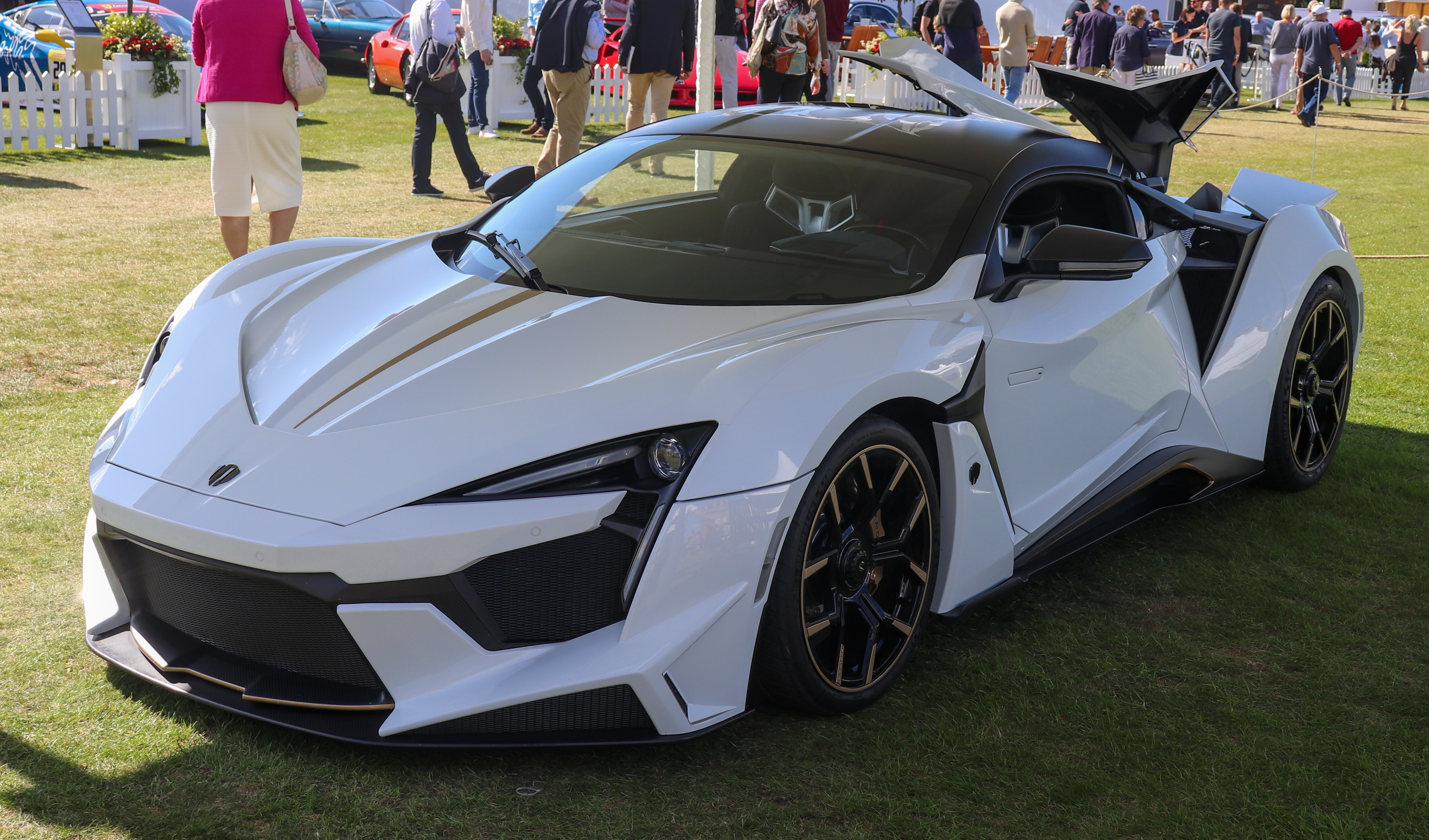

Overview
- Manufacturer: W Motors
- Production: 2019–present
- Model years: 2019–present
- Assembly: Austria: Graz (Magna Steyr)
- Designer: Anthony Jannarelly; Exequiel Di Salvo

Body and chassis
- Class: Sports car (S)
- Body style: 2-door coupé
- Layout: Rear mid-engine, rear-wheel-drive
- Doors: Suicide

Powertrain
- Engine: 3.8 L CTR38 twin-turbocharged flat-six
- Transmission: 7-speed PDK

Dimensions
- Wheelbase: 2,625 mm (103 in)
- Length: 4,684 mm (184 in)
- Width: 1,983 mm (78 in)
- Height: 1,199 mm (47 in)
- Kerb weight: 1,350 kg (2,976 lb)

Chronology
- Predecessor: W Motors Lykan HyperSport

The Fenyr SuperSport is a limited production sports car built by W Motors, a United Arab Emirates based company. It was unveiled at the 2015 Dubai Motor Show. The name of the car, Fenyr, comes from the word Fenrir, the name of a monstrous wolf in Norse mythology. The production of the car was originally planned to be up to 25 units per year, a drastic increase from the limited 7-car total production run of its predecessor. However, this was later changed to a total of 100 vehicles (and 10 launch editions).

== Specifications ==
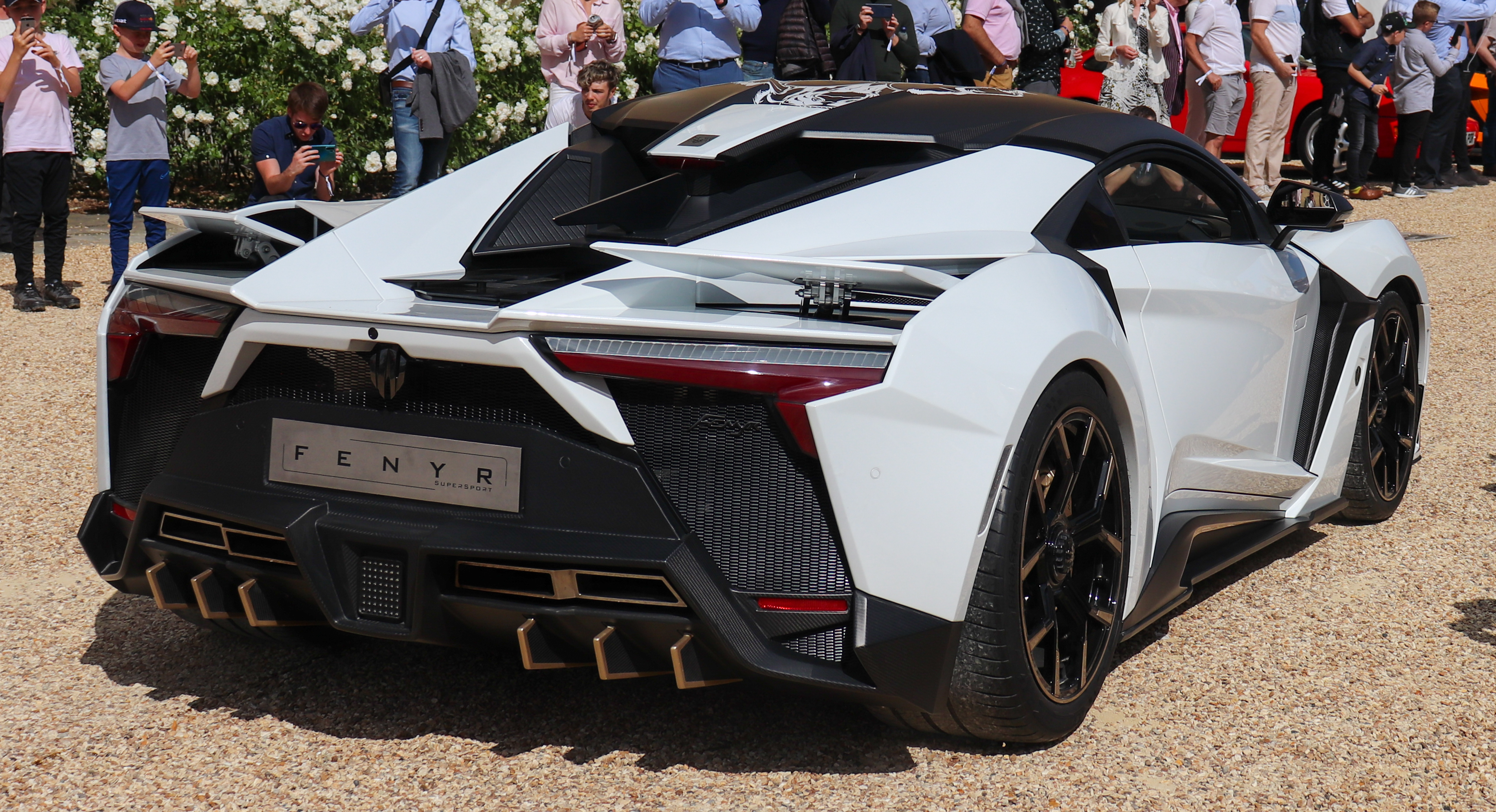
Rear view

=== Powertrain ===
The Fenyr SuperSport is powered by a 3.8 litre twin-turbocharged flat-six engine developed by Ruf Automobile, having a maximum power output of 596 kW (810 PS; 799 hp) at 7,100 rpm and 980 N⋅m (723 lb⋅ft) of torque at 4,000 rpm. The engine has mid-rear mounted position.

=== Transmission ===
The Fenyr SuperSport is equipped with Porsche's 7-speed dual-clutch PDK transmission. The transmission is paired with a limited-slip differential and is mounted transversely at the rear of the vehicle transferring power to the rear wheels.

=== Suspension ===
The Fenyr SuperSport utilises MacPherson strut suspension on the front axle, and multi-link suspension with horizontal coil over shock absorbers at the rear axle. Anti-roll bars are also installed at both axles.

=== Wheels and tyres ===
The Fenyr SuperSport is equipped with forged aluminum wheels with diameters of 19 inches at the front and 20 inches at the rear. The car utilises Pirelli P Zero tyres having codes of 255/35 ZR 19 for the front and 335/30 ZR 20 for the rear. The brakes have ventilated ceramic composite discs, with a diameter of 420 mm (16.5 in) each and utilising six-piston aluminium callipers at the front and rear.

=== Interior features ===
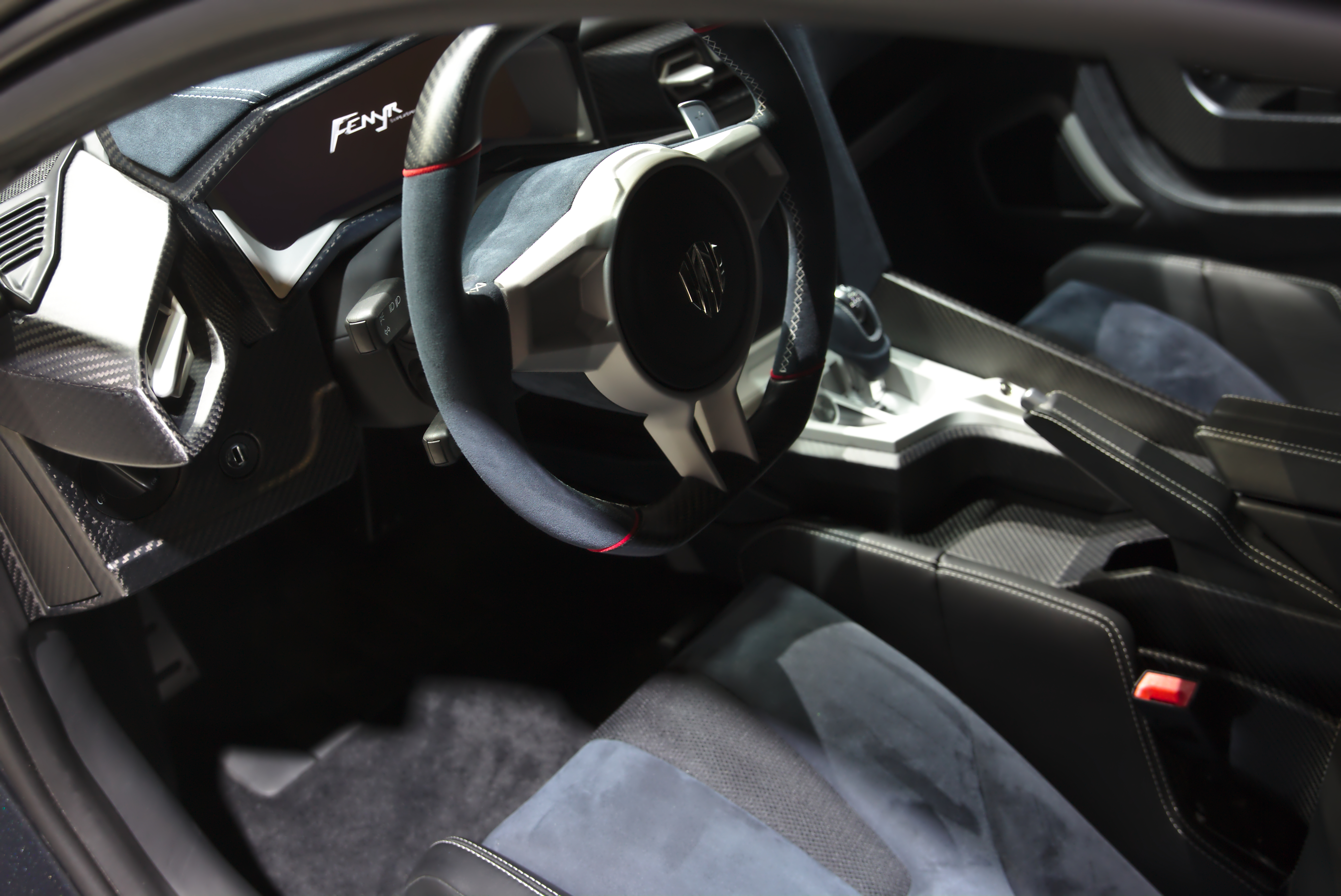
Interior.

The interior of the Fenyr SuperSport features a dashboard and central console finished in carbon-fibre and alcantara. The infotainment system includes a 12.3-inch dashboard display, 10.4-inch central display, and a 7.8-inch display for interior controls on the passenger side. The car also has a 4G router and a mobile app for enhanced connectivity and remote data monitoring.

== Performance ==
The manufacturer claims a top speed of 400 kilometres per hour (250 mph) for the Fenyr SuperSport. The car has a claimed 0–100 km/h (0–62 mph) acceleration time of 2.7 seconds. This is at least 5 km/h (3 mph) faster and 0.1 seconds quicker than the claimed figures for the Lykan HyperSport.

== Sales ==
The Fenyr was initially planned to have a production cap of 25 vehicles per year, however, this was later reduced to 100 vehicles plus 10 Launch Editions.

On 31 July 2019, W Motors announced via social media that the final 5 Launch Editions of the car had been sold to an anonymous Japanese businessman. News sources (and W Motors itself) later revealed the buyer as Tetsumi Shinchi.

Several sources also noted that Shinchi's Launch Editions would be debuted at the Mega Supercar Motor Show in 2021.

In January 2020 at the groundbreaking of the new W Motors factory, W Motors revealed the first 9 Launch Editions had already been delivered and a further batch of approximately 60 were in production.
