= Dubai International Motor Show =

Biennial auto show held in Dubai

Coordinates: 25.2230°N 55.2874°E

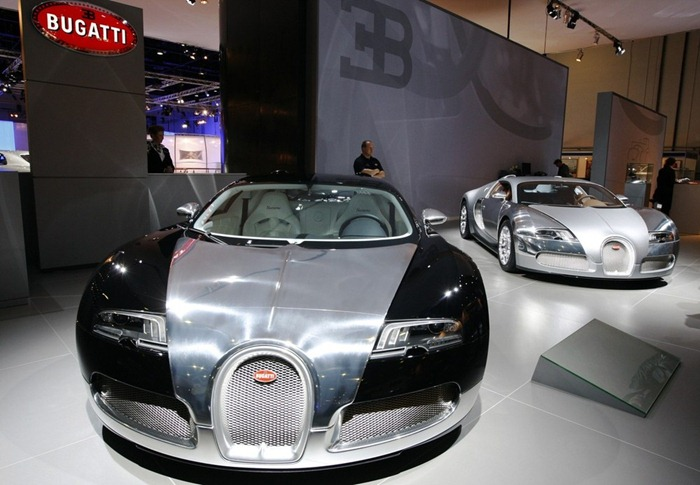
- A pair of Bugatti Veyrons at the 2009 Dubai Motor Show.
- Status: Active
- Venue: Dubai International Convention Centre
- Location: Emirate of Dubai, United Arab Emirates
- Country: United Arab Emirates
- Inaugurated: 1989
- Website: www.dubaimotorshow.com

The Dubai International Motor Show (The Middle East International Motor Show) is a biennial auto show held in the Emirate of Dubai, in the United Arab Emirates. It attracts many major car manufactures, tuning companies and other related firms, including major sports car manufacturers, such as Porsche and Mercedes-Benz.

== Gallery ==
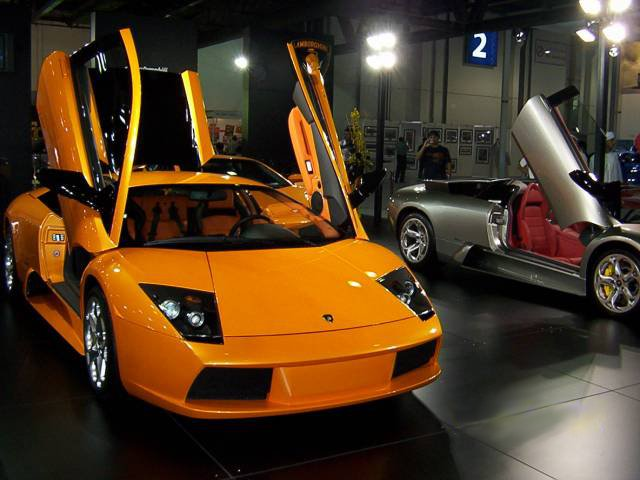
Lamborghini, costs 1.2 million Dirhams (3.6Dhs=1 $US)

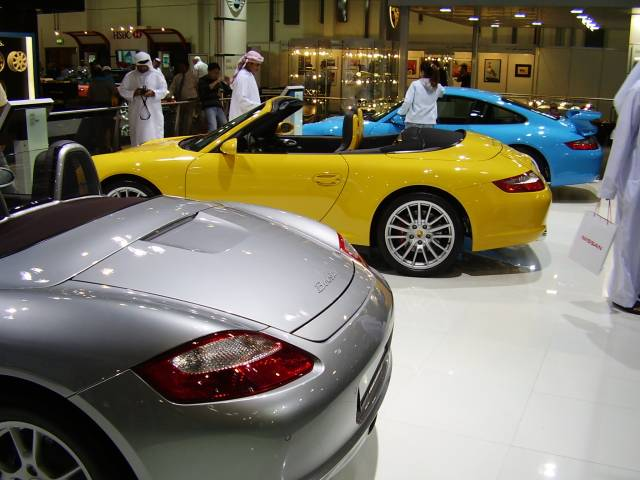
Porsche Boxster and Porsche Carrera

== History ==
=== 2005 ===
The 8th Middle East International Motor Show 2005, the premier biennial event for automobiles and aftermarket sectors scheduled to take place from December 12 to 16, 2005 at the Dubai International Convention and Exhibition Centre.

- Brabus Mercedes-Benz Unimog U500 Black Edition
- DC Design Mercedes-Benz S500 Stretch Concept
- DC Design DC Star XS Concept
- Mercedes-Benz ML 63 AMG

=== 2007 ===
- Kleemann ML63K
- Maybach 62 S Landaulet
- SSC Ultimate Aero

=== 2009 ===
- A.R.T. G Streetline
- Brabus GLK V12
- Bugatti Veyron Grand Sport Soleil Du Nuit
- Bugatti Veyron Sang d'Argent
- Bugatti Veyron Nocturne
- Gemballa GT 500 Aero 3
- Kia Cadenza
- Kepler MOTION
- Mercedes-Benz SLS 63 AMG "Desert Gold"
- Mercedes-Benz G 55 AMG Edition 79
- Porsche Cayenne Turbo "Gold Edition"
- Zenvo ST1
- PPI Razor GTR Carbon Fiber

=== 2011 ===
- BMW 750Li "UAE Edition"
- Brabus CL V12 800 Coupe
- Brabus E V12 800 Convertible
- Bugatti Veyron Grand Sport Yellow Black Carbon
- Bugatti Veyron Grand Sport Blue Carbon Aluminum
- Bugatti Veyron Grand Sport Green Carbon Aluminum
- Chevrolet TrailBlazer Concept
- De Macross GT1
- Jaguar XJ Sport Pack
- Jaguar XJ Speed Pack
- Land Rover Range Rover Evoque by Startech
- Nissan Juke-R Concept
- Mansory Continental GT
- Mansory Range Rover Sport
- Mercedes-Benz SLS AMG Roadster

=== 2015 ===
- W Motors Fenyr SuperSport

=== 2017 ===
- Chevrolet Corvette ZR1
- Devel Sixteen
- Devel Sixty
- McLaren 720S MSO Bruce McLaren Edition
