= Quimera GT =

Quimera Concept Car

Overview
- Manufacturer: Quimera
- Also called: All Electric GT (AEGT)
- Production: 2011 (prototype only)
- Assembly: Spain

Body and chassis
- Layout: Sports Car hybrid

Powertrain
- Electric motor: Electric

The Quimera Concept Electric Car is prototype electric vehicle with a claimed top speed of 300 km/h.

Quimera performed tests in August 2011, at Ciudad del Motor de Aragón, Spain.
