= Fast X =

2023 film by Louis Leterrier

- Theatrical release poster
- Directed by: Louis Leterrier (Note: Justin Lin, the film's original director, left production in April 2022, after a week through principal photography, due to creative differences. Leterrier took over directing duties in May. Lin remained credited as writer and producer.)
- Screenplay by: Dan Mazeau; Justin Lin
- Story by: Dan Mazeau; Justin Lin; Zach Dean
- Based on: Characters by Gary Scott Thompson
- Produced by: Neal H. Moritz; Vin Diesel; Jeff Kirschenbaum; Samantha Vincent; Justin Lin
- Starring: Vin Diesel; Michelle Rodriguez; Tyrese Gibson; Chris "Ludacris" Bridges; John Cena; Nathalie Emmanuel; Jordana Brewster; Sung Kang; Scott Eastwood; Daniela Melchior; Alan Ritchson; Helen Mirren; Brie Larson; Rita Moreno; Jason Statham; Jason Momoa; Charlize Theron
- Cinematography: Stephen F. Windon
- Edited by: Dylan Highsmith; Kelly Matsumoto
- Music by: Brian Tyler
- Production companies: Universal Pictures; Original Film; One Race Films; Perfect Storm Entertainment; Roth/Kirschenbaum Films
- Distributed by: Universal Pictures
- Release dates: May 12, 2023 (Colosseum); May 19, 2023 (United States)
- Running time: 141 minutes
- Country: United States
- Language: English
- Budget: $378.8 million
- Box office: $727.7 million

Fast X (also known as Fast & Furious 10) is a 2023 American action film directed by Louis Leterrier from a screenplay by Dan Mazeau and Justin Lin, both of whom also co-wrote the story with Zach Dean. The sequel to F9 (2021), it is the tenth main installment and the eleventh installment overall in the Fast & Furious franchise. It stars Vin Diesel as Dominic Toretto, alongside Michelle Rodriguez, Tyrese Gibson, Chris "Ludacris" Bridges, John Cena, Nathalie Emmanuel, Jordana Brewster, Sung Kang, Scott Eastwood, Daniela Melchior, Alan Ritchson, Helen Mirren, Brie Larson, Rita Moreno, Jason Statham, Jason Momoa, and Charlize Theron. In the film, Toretto must protect his family from Dante Reyes (Momoa), who pursues revenge for his father's death and the loss of their fortune.

Development on a tenth main Fast & Furious film began by October 2020, with Lin returning to direct. The film's official title was revealed when principal photography began in April 2022. Lin left as director later that month, citing creative differences, though he retained writing and producing credits. Leterrier was then hired as his replacement a week later and performed several uncredited rewrites to the screenplay. Longtime franchise composer Brian Tyler returned to score the film. With an estimated net production budget of $378.8 million, Fast X is the sixth-most expensive film ever made. Filming lasted until that August, taking place in London, Rome, Turin, Lisbon, and Los Angeles.

Fast X premiered in Rome on May 12, 2023, and was released in the United States on May 19, by Universal Pictures. The film received mixed reviews from critics, with praise for its action sequences and Momoa's performance but criticism towards the writing, and grossed $727 million worldwide, becoming the fifth-highest-grossing film of 2023, but underperformed studio and analyst expectations. A sequel, Fast Forever, is scheduled for March 2028.

== Plot ==
Dominic "Dom" Toretto and his team are asked by the Agency to steal a computer chip during its transit in Rome. Dom and his wife Leticia "Letty" Ortiz stay behind with his son Brian "Little B" Marcos, while Roman Pearce, Tej Parker, Han Lue, and Ramsey travel to Rome.

A wounded Cipher arrives at Dom's home and reveals that Hernan Reyes's son, Dante, has turned her crew against her by kidnapping their families. He intends to target Dom in revenge for his father's death and the loss of his family's fortune ten years earlier. (Note: As depicted in Fast Five (2011)) The next morning, Little Nobody tells Dom and Letty that the Agency has no mission in Rome, revealing that Dante has manipulated the team. Dom, Letty and Little Nobody travel there to rescue them.

Tej, Han and Ramsey break into the truck carrying the supposed computer chip, only to discover a DM-79 sub-nautical neutron mine. Dante remotely activates it and releases it into Rome's streets. Dom pushes the bomb into the Tiber River, limiting the damage, while Letty is arrested. Aimes, the Agency's de facto leader since Mr. Nobody's disappearance, (Note: As depicted in F9 (2021)) assumes Dom's team caused the bombing and orders a manhunt.

In Los Angeles, Dom and Mia's brother Jakob rescues Mia and Little B from Agency agents. With Mia's approval, Jakob takes Little B to a safe location in Portugal. Mr. Nobody's daughter, Tess, believes the team is innocent and uses God's Eye, a mass surveillance programme, to locate Dom in Naples. She tells him that Dante is in Rio de Janeiro.

Dom challenges Dante to a race in Rio alongside Elena Neves's sister Isabel and his ally Diogo. Dante kills Diogo with a bomb attached to his Porsche 911 when Dom chooses to save Isabel, winning the race. Meanwhile, Tess covertly wounds Letty at the black site, sending her to its treatment centre, where Cipher is also held. They deduce that the facility is in Antarctica and agree to escape together.

In London, Dom's team seeks help from Deckard Shaw. After fighting Shaw and Agency agents, Shaw agrees to assist while leaving to protect his mother from Dante's men. Aimes captures Dom in Rio, but Dante intercepts them on the bridge where Dom and Dante first met during the vault heist. A sniper wounds Tess, and Dante steals God's Eye from her. Aimes then allies with Dom against Dante.

Dante locates and kidnaps Little B in Portugal. Jakob sacrifices himself to destroy the pursuing mercenaries, allowing Dom to rescue his son. Dante then reveals that Aimes is his co-conspirator and shoots down a plane carrying Roman, Tej, Ramsey and Han. Dom drives off a dam with Little B to escape another trap. Dante arms eighteen explosives planted on the dam, intending to kill them.

In Antarctica, Gisele Yashar, presumed dead, (Note: As depicted in Fast & Furious 6 (2013)) emerges from a submarine and rescues Letty and Cipher.

In a mid-credits scene, Luke Hobbs infiltrates an abandoned theatre with a team of agents and receives a call from Dante, who declares Hobbs his next target for killing his father. Hobbs replies that he is easy to find and crushes the phone Dante contacted him on with his bare hands.

== Cast ==
- Vin Diesel as Dominic Toretto:
  A former criminal and professional street racer who has retired and settled down with his wife, Letty Ortiz, and his son, Brian Marcos. In an interview, Louis Leterrier described Fast X as exploring the fallout of Dom's actions in previous installments, saying "[Dom] has fought so hard to keep faith and protect family [but] there is a price to pay. His enemies are coming after him".
- Michelle Rodriguez as Letty Ortiz: Dom's wife and a former criminal and professional street racer.
- Tyrese Gibson as Roman Pearce: An ex-habitual offender, expert street racer, and a member of Dom's team.
- Ludacris (credited as Chris "Ludacris" Bridges) as Tej Parker: A tech expert, mechanic, and a member of Dom's team.
- John Cena as Jakob Toretto: Dom and Mia's brother and a master thief, assassin, and high-performance driver who once worked as an agent for Mr. Nobody. He has since reformed into a kinder person, sharing a loving relationship with his nephew, Little Brian.
- Nathalie Emmanuel as Ramsey: A computer hacktivist and a member of Dom's team. Emmanuel said that the character would see increased involvement in Fast X compared to the previous films.
- Jordana Brewster as Mia Toretto: Dom and Jakob's sister and a member of Dom's team who has two children with her husband, Brian O'Conner.
- Sung Kang as Han Lue: An expert drifter and member of Dom's team who previously faked his death during a covert operation for Mr. Nobody.
- Scott Eastwood as Little Nobody: A government law enforcement agent who worked under Mr. Nobody.
- Daniela Melchior as Isabel Neves: A Brazilian street racer and the sister of Dom's former girlfriend and Little B's mother, Elena Neves.
- Alan Ritchson as Aimes: The new leader of Mr. Nobody's agency who is covertly working with Dante. In early drafts, Aimes and Dante were brothers, and Ritchson revealed the film's plot twist was filmed alongside another ending, saying, "Aimes wouldn't care [if] he's evil [if] his methods made him feel like he was a good guy".
- Helen Mirren as Magdalene "Queenie" Ellmanson-Shaw: The leader of a female militia and an ally of Dom, as well as the mother of his former enemies Deckard and Owen. Mirren drew inspiration for the character from her aunt (also nicknamed Queenie) and from her performance as Queen Elizabeth II in The Queen (2006).
- Brie Larson as Tess: Mr. Nobody's daughter and agent who allies with Dom and his crew. According to Diesel, Larson drew inspiration from his daughter, Pauline, for the character.
- Rita Moreno as Abuelita Toretto: Dom, Jakob, and Mia's paternal grandmother.
- Jason Statham as Deckard Shaw: A former opponent of Dom and his team, who became an ally and new member after saving his son. Deckard's younger brother, Owen, was hospitalized working for Cipher.
- Jason Momoa as Dante Reyes: The son of drug lord Hernan Reyes, seeking revenge against Dom and his crew for the death of his father and loss of his family's fortune in Fast Five (2011). Momoa described the character as Dom's foil, saying Dante is "very sadistic and androgynous and he's a bit of a peacock... He's got a lot of issues. He's definitely got some daddy issues". Momoa expressed a desire to play against type when portraying Dante, taking on a "less macho" character, and he performed his own stunts for the film.
- Charlize Theron as Cipher: A criminal mastermind and cyberterrorist who was previously an enemy of Dom's team. Leterrier described Cipher as the "devil", and speaking on her dynamic with Dante, Leterrier said, "They are bad news, but one is more afraid than the other. One is worse news than the other".

Gal Gadot and Dwayne Johnson reprise their roles from the franchise uncredited as Gisele Yashar and Luke Hobbs during the final scene and mid-credits scene, respectively. Joaquim de Almeida reprises his role as Hernan Reyes, a ruthless drug lord and Dante's father, from Fast Five, while Leo Abelo Perry portrays Brian "Little B" Marcos, Dom's son. Luis Da Silva reprises his role from Fast Five as Diogo, a Brazilian street racer who allies with Dom and his crew. Cameo appearances include Brazilian singer Ludmilla as a race starter in Rio de Janeiro, Pete Davidson as Bowie, a friend of Ramsey, Paul Walker as Brian O'Conner via archival footage from Fast Five and his daughter Meadow as a flight attendant helping Jakob, and Debby Ryan and Josh Dun (credited as themselves) as a couple in an airport.

== Production ==
=== Development ===
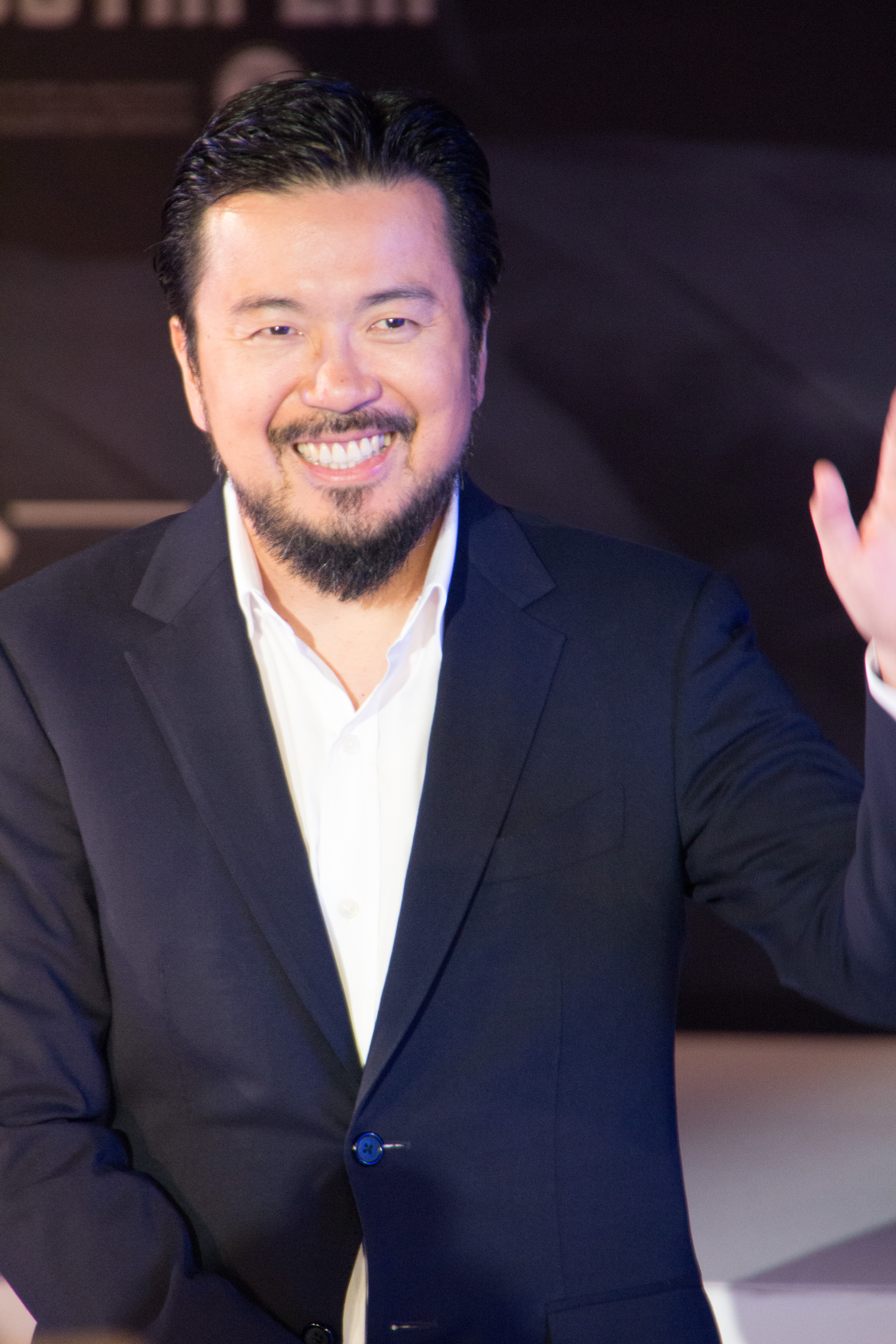
Justin Lin, who directed five films in the franchise, originally returned as director of Fast X.

In November 2014, Universal Pictures chairwoman Donna Langley confirmed that a discussion regarding three sequels to Furious 7 (2015) had taken place. Actor Vin Diesel reaffirmed this in September 2015, alluding the trilogy could lead to the mainline series' conclusion. Universal began developing two further sequels to F9 (2021) by October 2020. Justin Lin was to direct both films, with the tenth, Fast X, reworked to make its story the first half of a two-part finale, with the eleventh serving as the second half. Neal H. Moritz, Diesel, Jeff Kirschenbaum, Samantha Vincent, and Lin served as producers; Joe Caracciolo Jr., David Cain, Amanda Lewis, Chris Morgan and Mark Bomback were executive producers.

=== Writing ===
Lin and Dan Mazeau began writing their first draft in April 2022. That June, Tyrese Gibson announced Fast X would see the franchise "going back to its roots", with reports indicating this to be a return to street racing elements of previous entries, although he also shared details the film would also continue to explore the history of the Toretto family in a "similar" vein to F9. Leterrier later revealed the film focuses on increased familial responsibilities, saying, "Dom was always a lone wolf. He was living a quarter mile at a time [but] the stakes are real now. [He is] responsible for a human being, an innocent life [he] brought into the world". During an August 2022 interview with ComicBook, Nathalie Emmanuel said "the stakes are higher on a more personal level in this [film]", indicating a more grounded approach compared to previous installments. In developing the character of Dante, Leterrier revealed they wanted to forge the "anti-Dom", saying, "[Dante] is the yang of [Dom's] yin, the antichrist of his Christ", and wanted to give Dante clear motivation with Dom's role in Dante's origin story, noting, "There are strong ties with [Dante and Dom] and that is what makes an amazing villain because you understand why they became this and [their motivations]". Leterrier noted Larson's character as being influenced by "the generational legacy of the characters", saying, "Everybody [in the franchise] has a different point of view on Dom and his influence on their lives. That's how she [fits in]".

Describing the film's retcon of Fast Five (2011), Leterrier said it was to "explore the price of justice", noting, "[We] Rashomon'ed [the fifth film] to experience it through the eyes of Reyes, with Dom and Brian the thieves. We [wanted to] guide the audience to rethink everything they've experienced in the franchise [because] a good antagonist has their own truth, [separate] from the protagonists". Leterrier noted the film touches on each previous installment, saying, "The snowball [of Dom's actions] has picked up speed and became an avalanche". Leterrier also said his favorite film in the franchise is Fast Five. Leterrier later revealed he performed several uncredited rewrites to the entire screenplay on his initial travel to the set, stating he lacked sleep for the first four days he worked on the film. During its early promotional run, Leterrier said Fast X explores the potential breakup of family, noting "people are going to need to take sides [and] alliances will need to be made" compounded by "[the] war brewing" between the characters, saying "there will be some tremendous casualties". He later confirmed the film will end on a cliffhanger, and further hinted at character deaths, saying, "The beauty of the end of this franchise [is] understanding these characters will [not] live forever. Only in Westerns do cowboys gallop out into the sunset. This is different; the stakes even more than they've been before". This was seemingly confirmed by Michelle Rodriguez, who considered the fan reaction to the ending, saying, "You're going to feel so cheated in a way, but then so gratified and excited about what's to come. After 23 years of [making films], it's really tough at this stage to shock me, and they got me good". She reiterated this in a promotional interview with Collider for Dungeons & Dragons: Honor Among Thieves (2023), saying the ending of Fast X would "[leave] people really surprised and we're [going to] get open mouths at the end. In [the] theater, I was like, 'Oh my god. What have we done?!'". As one of his early ideas, Leterrier considered to have Jakob killed off due to the character's previous villainous role in F9. He felt the stakes of Jakob's death were important to Fast X's overall story and concluded Jakob's character arc, as it represented sacrifice to save Dom and Little B.

=== Casting ===
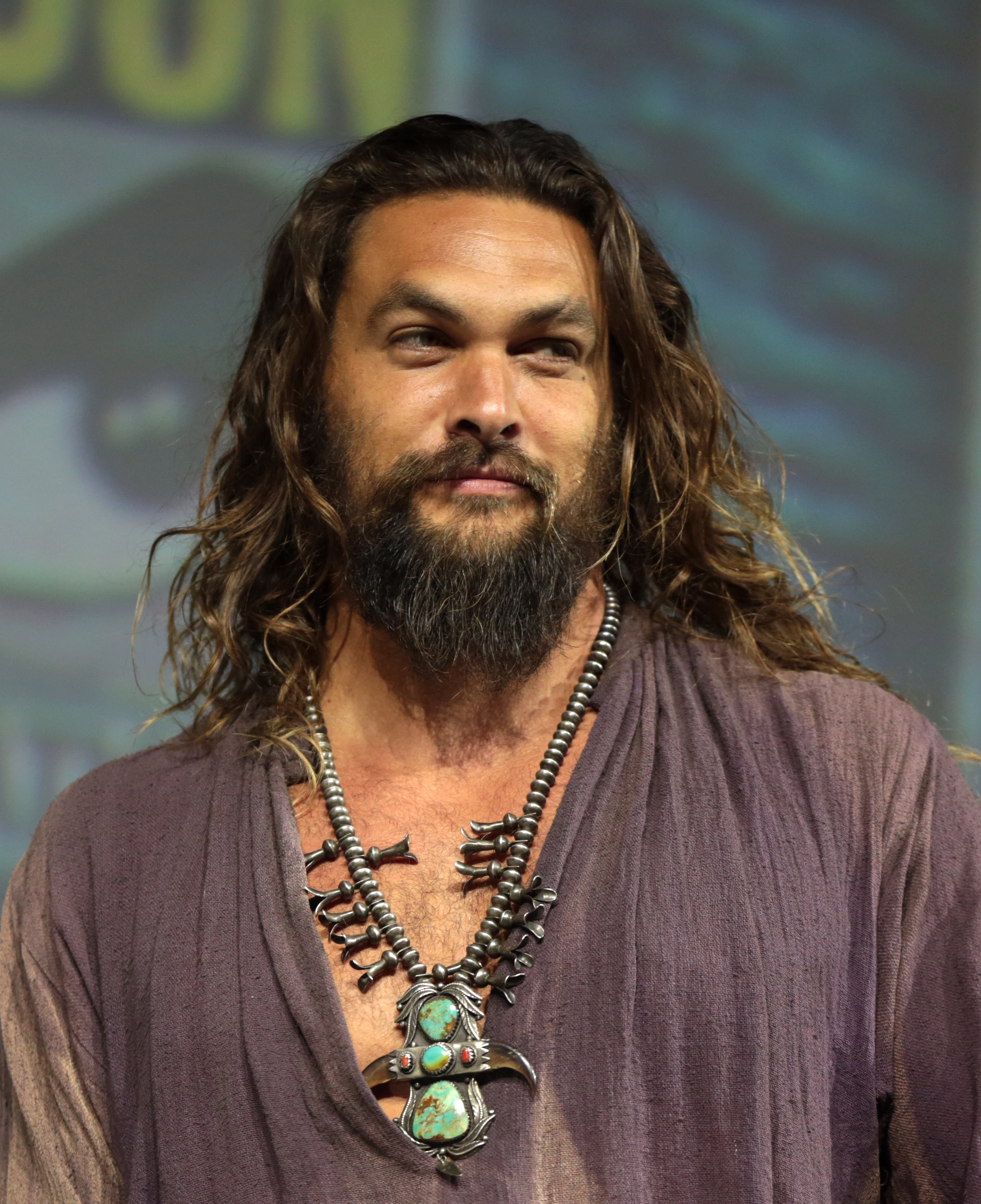
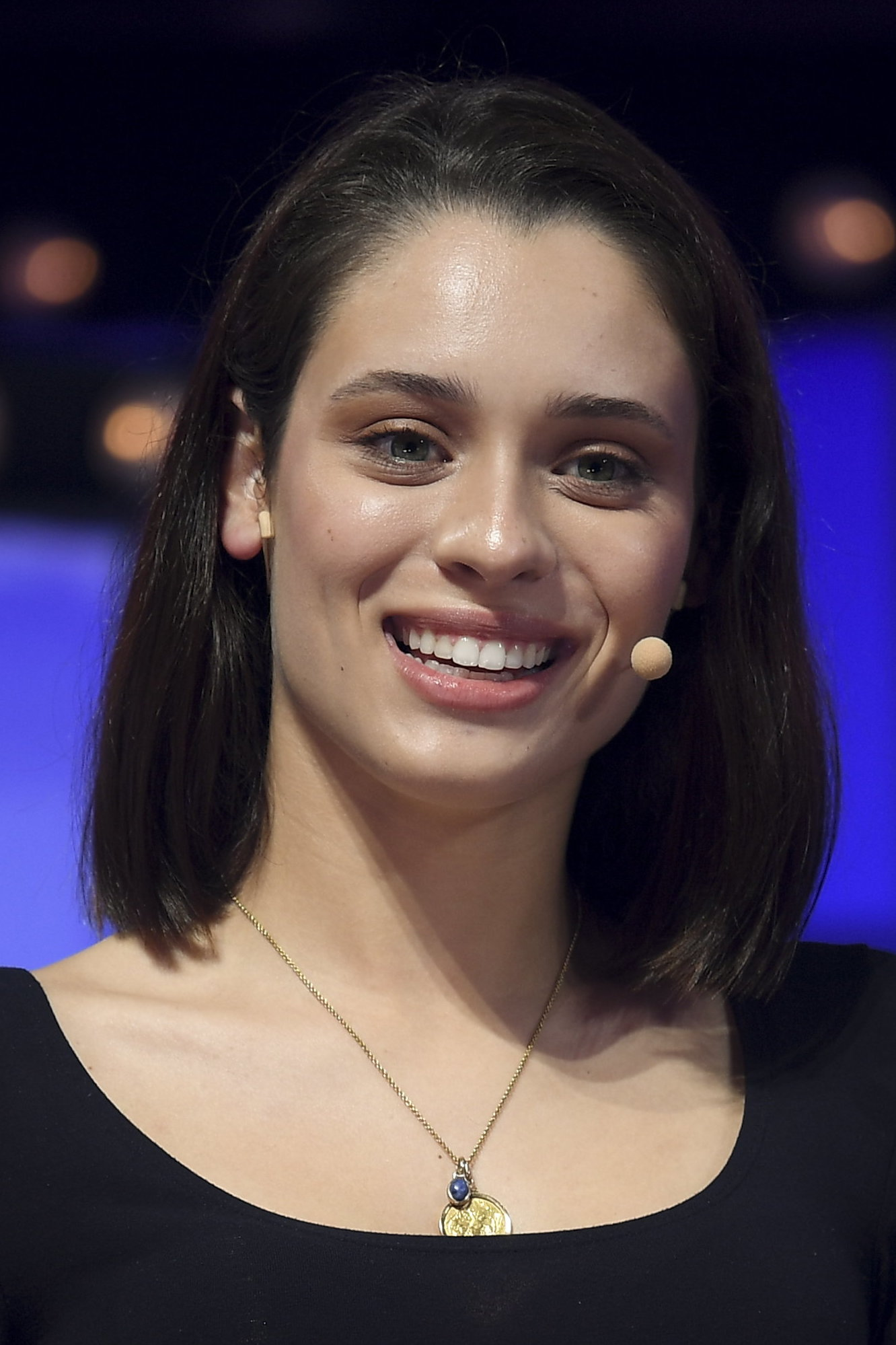
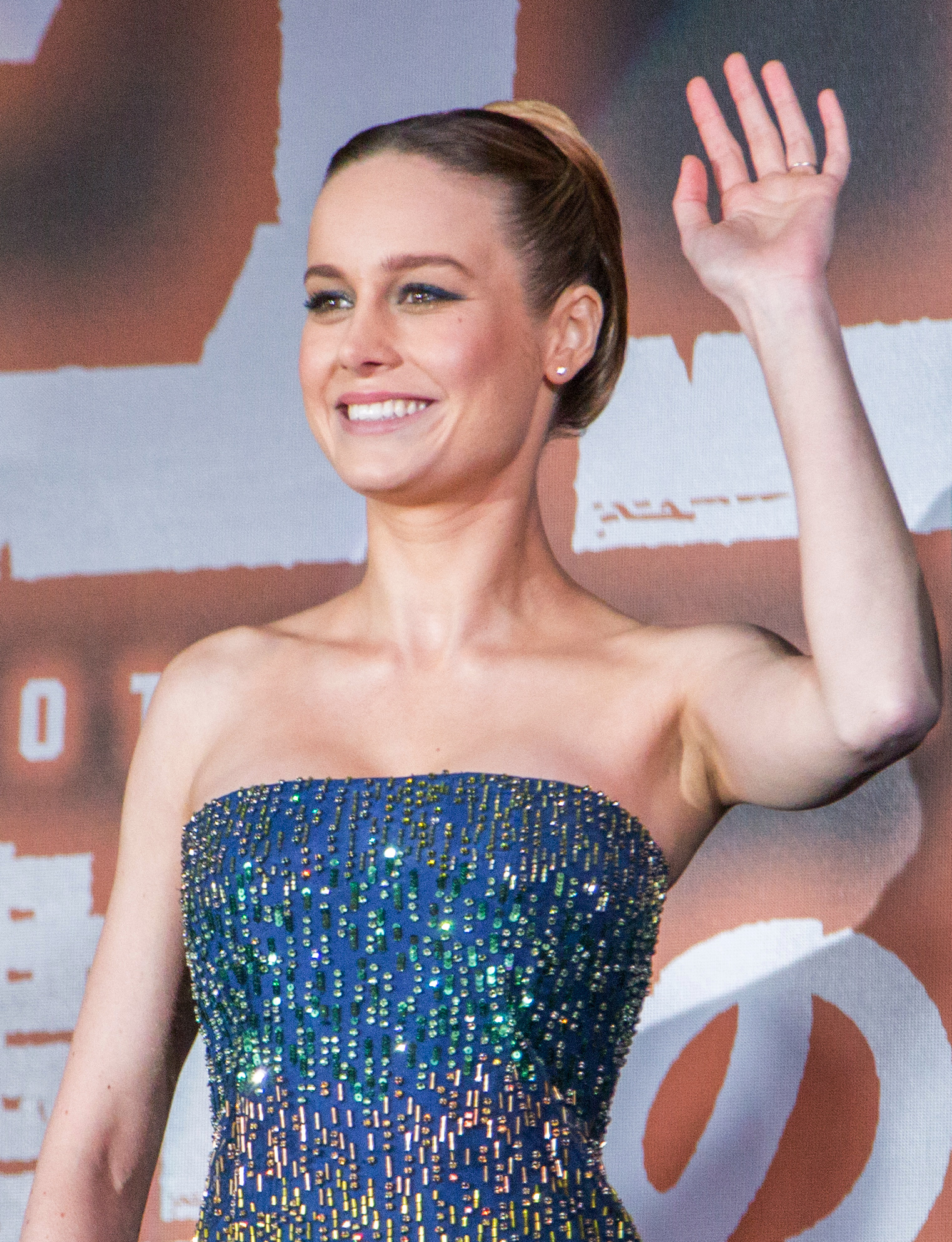
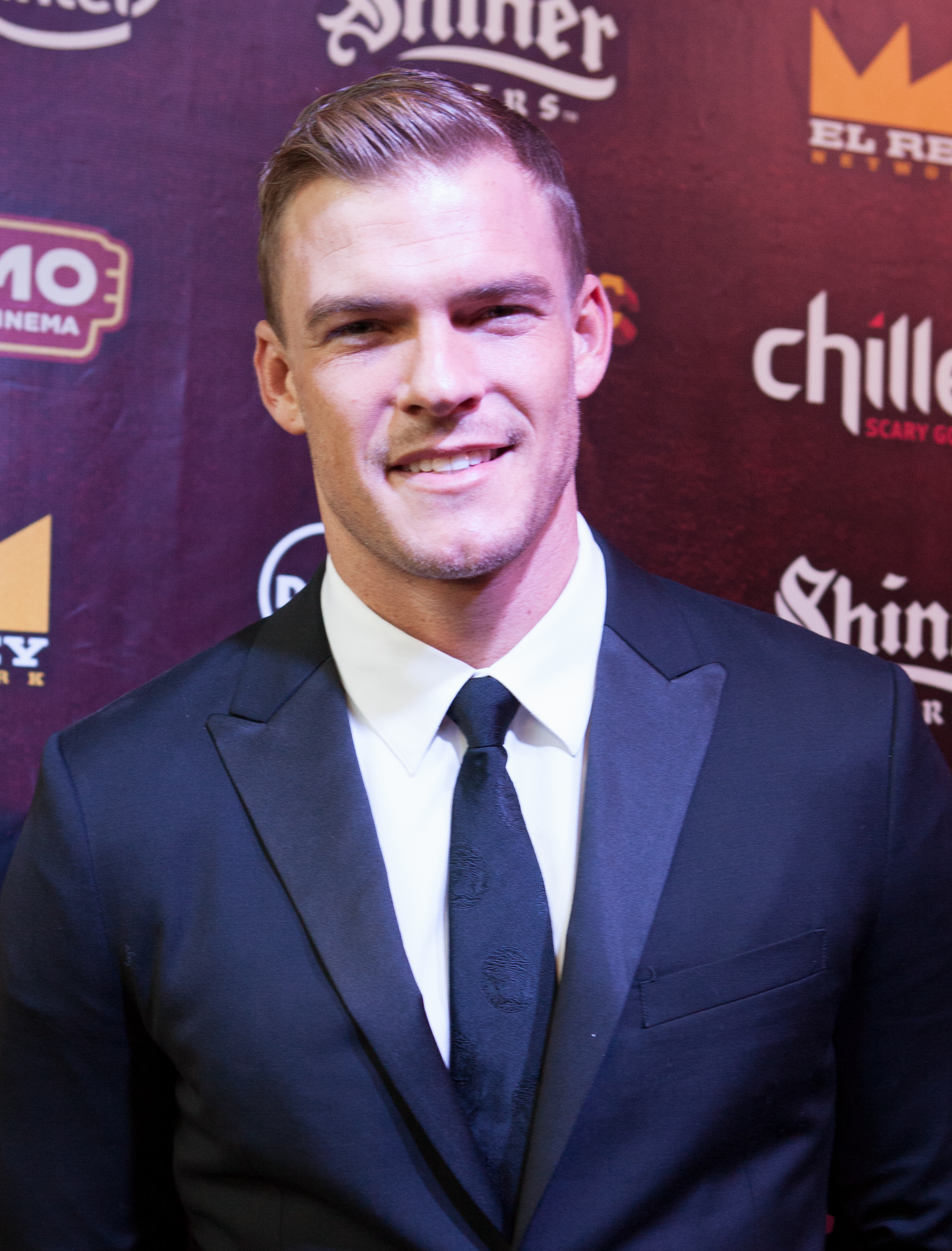
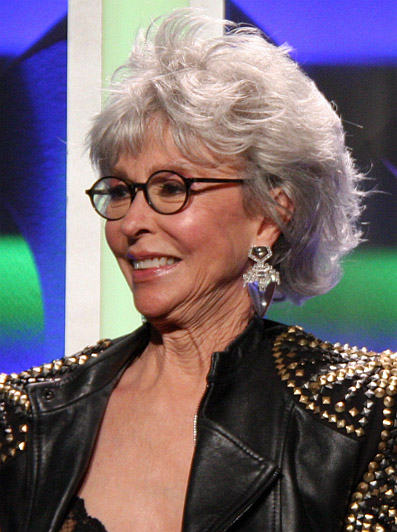
Jason Momoa, Daniela Melchior, Brie Larson, Alan Ritchson and Rita Moreno joined the main cast for Fast X.

In June 2021, Diesel announced the film would be split in a two-part culmination to the franchise, with principal photography slated to begin in January 2022 and take place back-to-back. In December 2021, Dwayne Johnson ruled out returning as Luke Hobbs for Fast X, and labeled an Instagram post by Diesel asking for his return as "manipulation", with publications indicating he was referring to a feud with Diesel stemming from Diesel's role as a producer on The Fate of the Furious (2017). He ultimately reprised his role in a mid-credits scene cameo appearance.

In early 2022, Jason Momoa was cast as Dante, the villain, while Daniela Melchior, Brie Larson, and Alan Ritchson joined the cast by that April. Keanu Reeves was originally approached to play Aimes, having been previously in talks to join the franchise as the villainous Eteon Director in Hobbs & Shaw (2019): Ritchson was ultimately cast after being contacted by Lin while Ritchson was filming Ordinary Angels (2024). Ritchson accepted the role while production on Ordinary Angels was halted due to a blizzard affecting the film's Winnipeg set. Ritchson assumed the directorial change would subsequently result in his own replacement but he was retained on Fast X by producer Jeff Kirschenbaum. Larson was initially hesitant to immediately join another franchise after starring in the Marvel Cinematic Universe (MCU), saying, "I was scared of what would happen [by joining Fast & Furious]. But what I always come back to is, I have to live with myself in a way that nobody else has to. The choices I make, I have to live with, whether I regret them or not", but stated Fast & Furious was her "dream franchise", saying, "I've been begging to be in this for years. Being part of something you've watched your whole life and that you love is an amazing feeling".

In a March 2023 interview with Total Film, Larson revealed she would portray Tess, the daughter of government agent and covert operations team leader Mr. Nobody; she described Tess as "a bridge", saying, "she doesn't go along with the Agency. She believes in the legacy her father set up, standing with Dom and the Toretto family". Describing Momoa's addition, Leterrier said Dante is "an incredible new character. It's 1,000 per cent Momoa", while Michelle Rodriguez said Dante is "malicious but he can be playful. It's like a fresh energy. There's something charming about him". She later labeled Dante as the best male villain in the franchise, describing him as "revenge with a smirk". After being cast, Momoa was initially apprehensive over filming conditions due to the reports of conflict on set between Diesel and Lin, and said he accepted the role to play against type. In May, Rita Moreno was cast as Abuelita, the grandmother of Dom, Jakob, and Mia, with Leterrier describing her inclusion as the "guiding light that Dom is following", adding, "[Abuelita] is his conscience, [she is one] of the people that keep him grounded. When your grandmother you haven't seen for years gives you a message that becomes guiding for the second part of your life, you listen". In a February 2023 interview with Collider, Moreno's grandson said he pitched for her inclusion in Fast X after he met Diesel at the premiere for West Side Story (2021), which starred Moreno.

On December 23, 2022, it was revealed that Gal Gadot, who portrayed Gisele Yashar in three previous installments, filmed a scene for Fast X; according to social media reports, she appeared in one of two versions of the film screened three days prior, with further details about the nature of her return undisclosed. Gadot's potential return was met with mixed reception by fans and critics; some criticized the franchise's history of reviving dead characters to capitalize on star power, labeling it "ineffective" fan service which negatively impacts the previous installments and the story of the franchise. Others were positive about Gadot's potential return, citing her portrayal of one of the franchise's most popular characters. In a February 2023 interview with ComicBook, Sung Kang refused to rule out Gadot's character being resurrected in Fast X. As the final cast rounded out, it sparked debate that it could create a story problem for the film; writing for Screen Rant, Ryan Northrup said, "With such a large cast, it's uncertain whether Fast X will be able to serve [every] character in a satisfying way. With many new and returning characters, [every] arc may not be as fleshed out [and if] new characters aren't given much screen time or development, [it will be] a disappointment. [It may be] up to the finale to rectify [it]".

A month later, a leaked email from The Hollywood Reporter revealed some crew returned after principal photography had completed to film a "button or tag" (a mid or post-credits scene) that will feature "a guest cameo". Gadot and Johnson ultimately reprised their roles in cameo appearances. Rodriguez and Diesel later said Gadot's return had been planned for previous installments (going as far as to film unused cameos), with Diesel reasoning the decision to include Gadot in Fast X was done because it "fit the [film]". He also said, "Doing tags is tricky because you want great talent but at the same time you have to be very careful to maintain the emotional state of your audience".

Following the release of the film's trailer on February 9, 2023, Leterrier hinted archival footage featuring Paul Walker from previous films may be used in Fast X, saying, "Brian is very much alive in [this franchise]. This [film] jumps back and forth between the past and the present. You will see Brian in the past, you won't see Brian in the present. [His] family is part of this franchise. It has to be the right moment, the right tone [if] Brian has to re-enter the franchise. [It must be] as perfect as how he left". Regarding Walker's inclusion, Rodriguez said, "It's really hard to [make the films] without a blessing of some sort from [his] family because it's everything. Without that kind of like that love from them, we would be lost". She also revealed Furious 7 is her favorite film in the franchise, citing its emotional tribute to Walker. Diesel similarly commented on Walker's potential inclusion in the film in a March 2023 interview with Total Film, saying, "[Universal] made a bold, righteous, and daring decision to keep Brian O'Conner alive. I couldn't image this saga ending without truly saying goodbye to Brian".

=== Filming ===
Principal photography began on April 21, 2022, with the film's title being revealed and Michelle Rodriguez, Tyrese Gibson, Chris "Ludacris" Bridges, Jordana Brewster, Nathalie Emmanuel, Sung Kang, and Charlize Theron confirmed to reprise their roles. According to Diesel, an earlier draft excluded Brewster's character, which he overturned. Fast X's production budget was initially reported to be $300 million in May 2022, which was revised to $340 million that November; the cast was reportedly paid $100 million for their involvement, including $20 million for Diesel. Other costs for the rising budget included increases in production costs caused by global inflation and charges for pandemic testing requirements mandated by COVID-19 safety protocols: an estimated $22.6 million was spent on production staff, which peaked at 211 people not including freelancers or agency workers (who represent the majority of a film crew). According to unnamed sources reporting to Radar, Diesel reportedly "stressed" over the increased budget and the creative decisions in Fast X; sources wrote Diesel is considered by Universal as "simultaneously the greatest star [they've] had and their biggest headache" and that "[Diesel] doesn't let anybody forget [how] the Fast & Furious franchise is important to the whole [film] industry". In April 2024, it was revealed in a report by Forbes that the total amount spent by Universal on Fast X was $453.6 million, which would have made it the most expensive film of all-time: the net cost was revealed to be $378.8 million, owing to a $74 million tax reimbursement paid to the studio by the UK government for staging production in the country.

A week after filming commenced, Lin exited the film as director due to "creative differences", leaving primary production stalled. However, Lin remained on board as a producer. Later reports alleged that Lin clashed on set with Diesel, who purportedly arrived out of shape, was often late, and did not remember his lines. Lin was also upset with rewrites to his screenplay, as well as changing filming locations and one of the film's villains having yet to be cast; a disagreement with Diesel reportedly escalated to the point it caused Lin to shout, "This movie is not worth my mental health". Lin reportedly forewent pay in the region of $10–20 million in his departure. Second unit production remained ongoing in the United Kingdom while the studio sought a replacement director and Universal Pictures reportedly spent $1 million a day to pause production. Former Fast & Furious directors F. Gary Gray and David Leitch, who previously directed The Fate of the Furious and Hobbs & Shaw respectively, were considered by the studio to replace Lin, however neither were seen as likely to step in due to their commitments with Lift and The Fall Guy (both 2024), respectively. Furious 7 director James Wan, who was once considered to direct The Fate of the Furious and F9 but declined due to his straining experience on Furious 7, was seen as a "viable option" but was tied up with commitments to Aquaman and the Lost Kingdom (2023), the final DC Extended Universe (DCEU) film. Variety reported hiring an "A-list" director was not probable without drastic changes to the screenplay and Universal would likely turn to a second unit director "well-versed" in big-budget action films. On May 2, 2022, Louis Leterrier was announced as Lin's replacement; he was previously shortlisted by Universal to direct The Fate of the Furious.

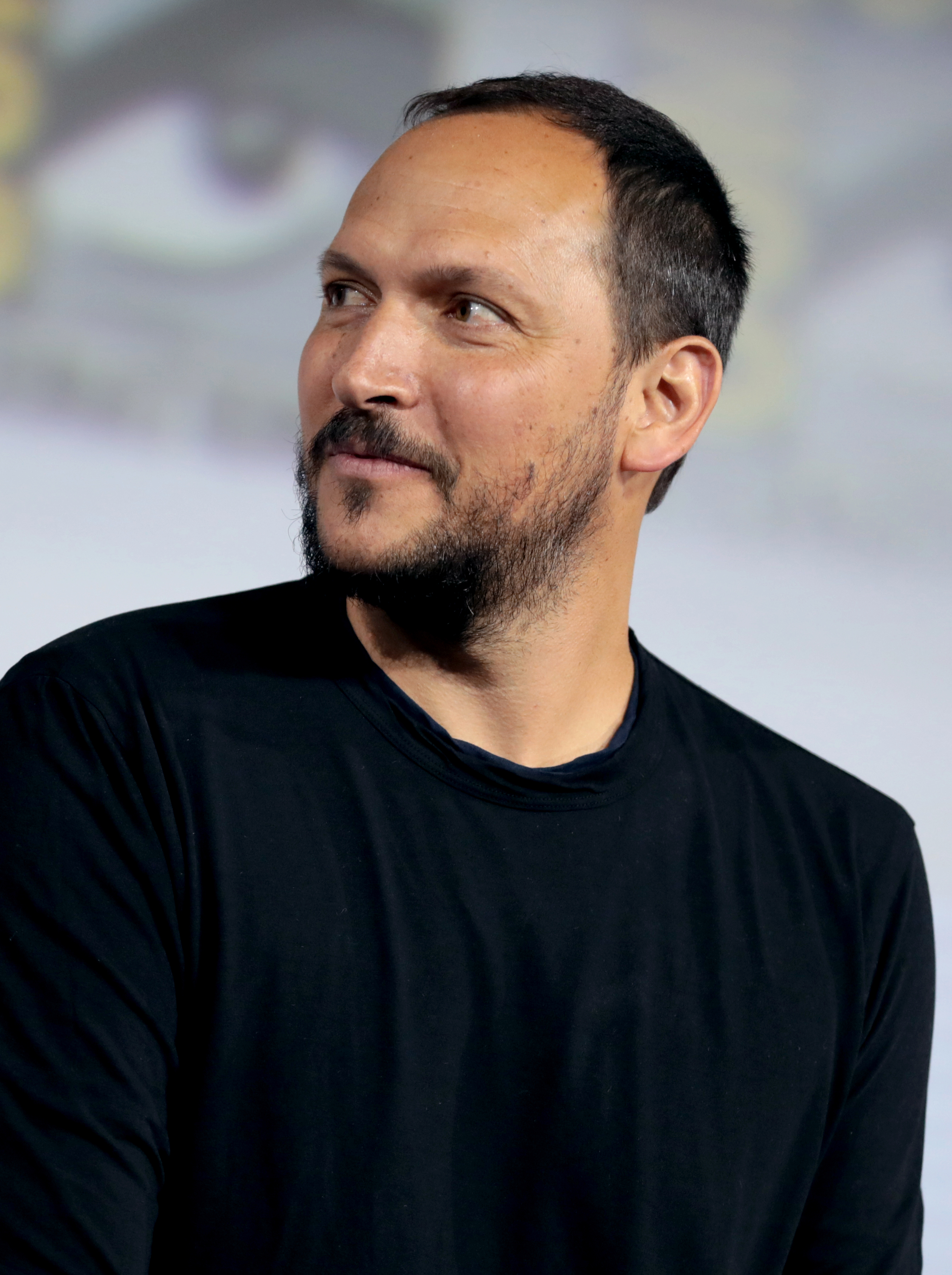
Louis Leterrier replaced Lin as director a week after filming began

Leterrier had an established relationship with Universal, having directed the MCU film The Incredible Hulk (2008), and he was knowledgeable about the franchise; he and franchise star Jason Statham went to watch the first installment in Paris in 2001 while on a break from filming The Transporter (2002). Leterrier joined filming in London after scheduling and contractual considerations were confirmed; he later revealed he initially rejected the offer to direct the film, labeling it a "massive" task. Leterrier went onto use elements of Lin's original contributions, such as the established crew, as well as Lin's shot lists and storyboards, to complete the film. Production in London concluded in mid-August, with scenes filmed at Warner Bros. Studios, Leavesden. Rodriguez later revealed a fight sequence between her and Theron was shot without a principal director, being done while studio negotiations with Leterrier were ongoing. Describing his style for the film, Leterrier said, "I'm more practical than other directors, and I brought [the franchise] back to earth", revealing he favored more practical stunts (including a return of racing scenes featuring a "vertical quarter mile race") enhanced with visual effects, as opposed to the extensive use of computer-generated imagery (CGI) in the recent installments.

Filming took place in Genzano di Roma in mid-May. Filming took place in Rome for two weeks in mid-May, and one week in mid-July, with scenes being shot at the Via Cristoforo Colombo, Lungotevere, Via dei Fori Imperiali, Ponte Umberto I, Ponte Vittorio Emanuele II, and the area around the Castel Sant'Angelo and the Spanish Steps. Filming then took place in Turin between May 24 and June 6, with action sequences filmed at the Piazza Crimea and Corso Fiume, Piazza Vittorio Veneto, Murazzi del Po, Via Roma, and the Piazza IV Marzo. To allow filming in Turin, local authorities, the Film Commission Torino Piemonte, and city councilors were required to conduct a five-month planning schedule from September 2021 to January 2022, collaborating with the Departments of Culture to coordinate the city's major events, roads and transport, public, and security around the film's requirements. This included managing the overflight of drones and limitations on circulation made necessary for the management and safety of the set.

Momoa began shooting his scenes on May 16. Like previous installments, Diesel supervised writing and design of the film's action sequences; according to unnamed sources to The Hollywood Reporter, Diesel's creative control and frequent last-minute changes reflect "a process [which] is like a mosaic that doesn't stop moving", labeling him "demanding" and a perfectionist. On June 6, it was reported a stuntman was injured in an accident after being hit by part of a car after an explosion. On July 22, in an interview with Deadline Hollywood while at San Diego Comic-Con, Rodriguez announced she had completed filming her scenes and said "only four [or] five weeks [are] left" in production. Filming in Angelino Heights (the location of the Toretto house) faced protest from some local residents after production gave notice of the filming of a sequence which would involve "simulated emergency services activity, aerial photography, wetting down of street and atmospheric smoke". According to those residents, the protest was to raise awareness for road safety education, claiming the franchise caused their neighborhood to become a hot spot for fans to engage in street racing and other dangerous activity. Filming managed to occur following the protest on August 26, while other portions were filmed in Portugal, including Lisbon, Almada, Viseu, and Vila Real. Conceição Azevedo, the mayor of Viseu, announced filming would take place on IP5, a highway in the Vouzela municipality, during an interview with Lusa News Agency. Ritchson finished filming his scenes by August 16, and hinted at flying cars in the film, stating "we're going to take it to the sky".

During filming, Sofia Noronha, a producer for Sagesse Productions (the company in charge of overseeing production of Fast X in Portugal) said a "brutal economic investment" will be made in the country by the film. Highlighting the weather, affordability through tax breaks, and flexibility of the production, Noronha argued "investments [from film] made in the country is almost double that tax incentive. The [producing] country always benefits". This was echoed during filming in Turin, with it reported the two-week schedule generated €3.8 million for the local economy, coming mainly from expenses related to location rent, hospitality, technical staff and local workforce employment, security and sanitation, and storage and unloading. It was also reported the film regularly brought troupes of close to 400 people (5 times above average for comparable films) and often collaborated with hundreds of local professionals on the research of locations and finalization of the working filming plan. In a statement, Beatrice Borgia, President of Film Commission Torino Piemonte, said "Fast X is a confirmation of the key role Turin and Piedmont has gained in filmmaking. [We have] proved to have all what is needed to host complex productions: skilled professionals, supportive institutions, and amazing locations".

==== Vehicles ====
Fast X is the first film in the series to feature electric cars, with leaked set photos featuring the 2024 Dodge Charger Daytona SRT Banshee Concept and the gull-winged DeLorean Alpha5. Other vehicles include the 2022 TorRed Dodge Charger R/T, the 2023 Dodge Charger SRT Hellcat Redeye, and the 1970 Charger R/T, the latter a franchise staple. On June 27, 2022, it was reported Fast X would include the fan-favorite orange and black Veilside Mazda RX-7 FD Fortune, which first featured in The Fast and the Furious: Tokyo Drift (2006). The inclusion of the electric Dodge Chargers in the film was confirmed upon release of the first trailer on February 9, 2023, with the "Greys of Thunder" Dodge Charger Daytona SRT also appearing in other promotional material. In an interview with Fox News, a Dodge spokesperson said the company "has a long-standing marketing partnership with Fast & Furious", which will continue with Fast X. Other vehicles which featured in the film include the foreign-made Lamborghini Gallardo, Alfa Romeo 159 and 2000 GTV, Nissan Silvia, Porsche 911 997 GT3 RS, Pagani Huayra Tricolore, and the Datsun 240Z, as well as the U.S.-made Chevrolet Impala and El Camino, Lenco BearCat Armoured Vehicle, and the 1966 Ford Fairlane. In an interview with vehicle co-ordinator Dennis McCarthy, who worked on every Fast & Furious film since Tokyo Drift, each significant car featured on screen required around seven duplicates, resulting in an estimated 200 cars built for Fast X to race-car standards required for the stunt work. In April 2023, Momoa revealed that he personally contacted Jochen Zeitz, the CEO of Harley-Davidson, to secure six motorcycles to be used in the film for his character. He is seen riding the Harley-Davidson Pan America throughout the film, which was modified with an upgraded exhaust system and extra shielding.

=== Post-production ===
Dylan Highsmith and Kelly Matsumoto, both of whom were two of the three co-editors on F9, return as editors. Peter Chiang returns as the visual effects supervisor for the production, after doing so for F9, with DNEG and Industrial Light & Magic as the returning visual effects vendors. In a July 2022 interview with The Hollywood Reporter, Michelle Rodriguez praised the addition of Leterrier and his predominantly French-speaking creative team, labeling it "the French takeover, dude". She stated Leterrier "came with all this energy of love [from] a real fan of [the] franchise who really wants to take it places that it hasn't gone before. It reminds you [how] beautiful and magical [filmmaking] is". Several aerial shots were filmed with first-person view (FPV) drones with an attached WarpCam piloted by Johnny Schaer, similar to the filming techniques used for the action sequences in Michael Bay's Ambulance (2022). Schaer previously supervised the drone-led filming in Rawson Marshall Thurber's Red Notice (2021).

To create Fast X's flashback sequence, the filmmakers used the dailies from Fast Five sourced from the archival department at Universal to secure "alternate takes and different angles". The pre-existing and unused footage was then composited to create the sequence, with characters into the footage using motion control photography and CGI. In March 2023, the writing credits were finalized; Mazeau and Lin received screenplay credits, and both shared story credits with Zach Dean, while Suzan-Lori Parks and Mark Bomback also received off-screen credits for additional literary material. In May, despite his initial refusal to return to the franchise, it was revealed that Dwayne Johnson accepted a late-stage return as Luke Hobbs in the film's mid-credits scene.

=== Music ===
The first single for the film's soundtrack, "Let's Ride", was released on February 10, 2023, performed by YG, Ty Dolla Sign, and Lambo4oe. The soundtrack features hip hop, pop, reggaeton, electronic rock, and rhythmic Latin tracks. The second song from the film, "Won't Back Down", performed by YoungBoy Never Broke Again, Bailey Zimmerman, and Dermot Kennedy, was released on May 4. The soundtrack of the film was released on May 19, by Artist Partner Group.

In March 2023 during post-production, Brian Tyler returned to composed the film score. Tyler had previously scored six of the franchise's installments, starting with Tokyo Drift. The official score album was being released on June 2, 2023, by Back Lot Music.

== Marketing ==
Parts of Fast X previewed at CineEurope in Barcelona in June 2022, including a first look at Jason Momoa and Brie Larson. Speaking of the film, Universal Pictures International President of Distribution, Veronika Kwan Vandenberg, stated the studio's drive was to continue to "cater to the diverse tastes" expected from the franchise. At the 2022 Grio Awards, Tyrese Gibson stated he watched the completed film on October 20, 2022, describing it as "crazy" with "just too much magic", and announced an extended version of the film's trailer would first premiere at Super Bowl LVII on February 12, 2023. This was seemingly confirmed in a December 2022 social media post by Vin Diesel, who wrote the trailer was "less than two months away", and was made it official in January 2023 post. In a January 2023 report by Collider, it was confirmed the first trailer would debut worldwide on February 10, 2023 (after being screened at a private fan event a day prior); it was three minutes long, and was followed with a Super Bowl spot alongside Dungeons & Dragons: Honor Among Thieves, Cocaine Bear, Scream VI, 65, Air, Guardians of the Galaxy Vol. 3 and The Flash (all 2023). Beginning February 1, to promote the release of the trailer, official recuts of the trailers of each of the previous nine films, dubbed "Legacy Trailers", were released daily in conjunction with IGN. The fan event took place at L.A. Live in downtown Los Angeles, being hosted by Maria Menounos and featuring Diesel, Rodriguez, Gibson, Ludacris, and Cody Walker, the brother of the series' longtime initial star Paul Walker. Similar fan events also took place in Mexico, France, and Japan but did not feature the cast.

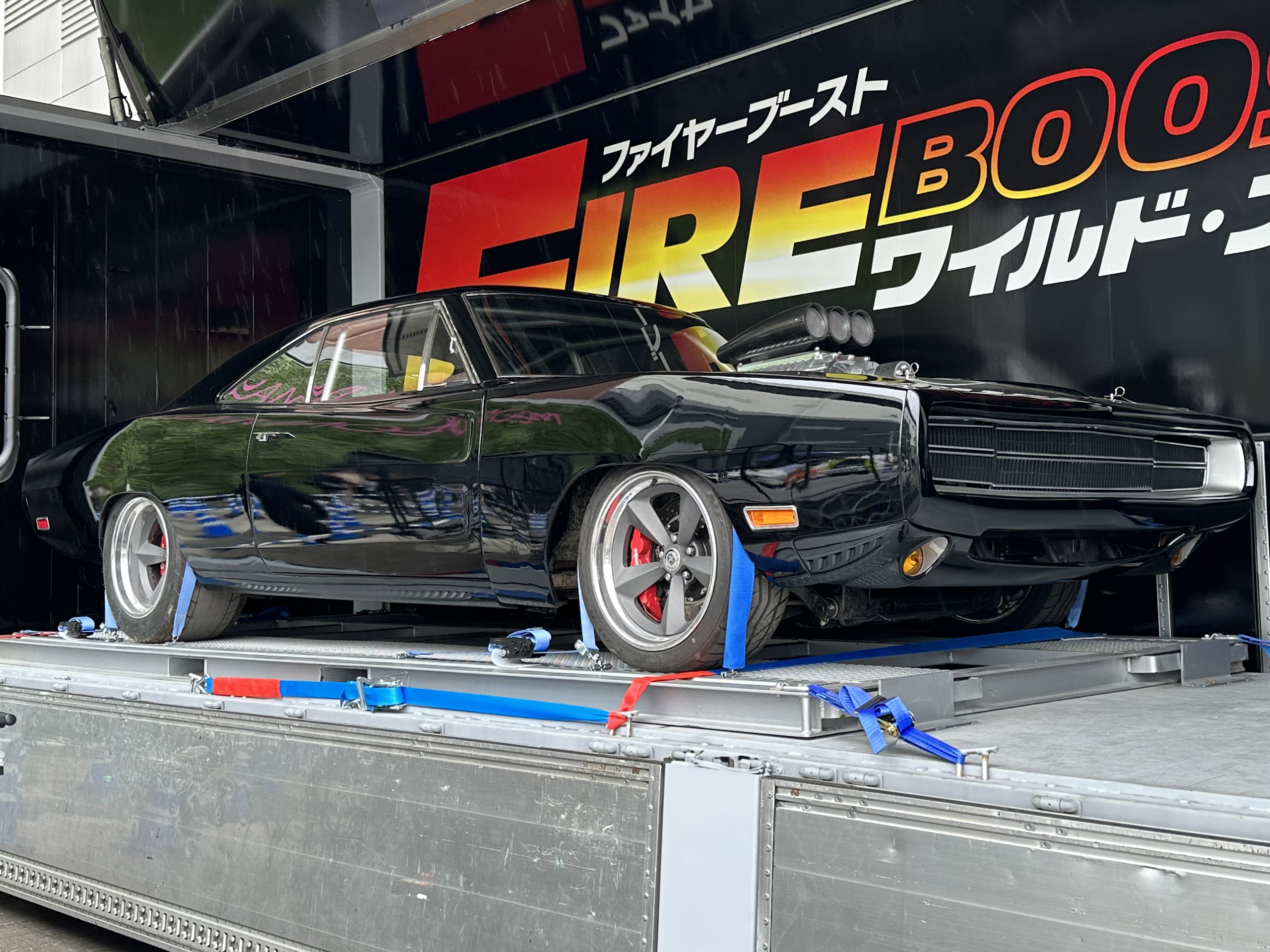
To promote Fast X, cars used in the film went on display at exhibitions across the world, such as the 1970 Dodge Charger operated by Diesel (pictured in Japan).

On February 1, the film's teaser poster was released, depicting Diesel alone in the center, bowing his head and clutching a cross between his fists on a dark to light backdrop. Writing for Collider, Safeeyah Kazi said his positioning depicts "an intense prayer" with the "small amount of light [from the cross] engulfing his fist acting as the optimism in the dark". She also said that the relative simplicity of the poster compared to the "color explosion" for F9 could indicate a grittier storyline in Fast X. Kazi wrote the film's "the end of the road begins" tagline depicted "a new level of intensity", and speculated it could refer to the end for some of the franchise's characters. In an analysis by Matt Singer of WBUF, Singer described the poster as "somber", noting it as "remarkably tense" compared to the posters for other entries in the franchise. Stills from the film detailing Momoa, Larson, and Diesel's characters were publicly released on February 9, and was followed by a teaser showcasing the main cast a day later. The official trailer then released soon after, featuring an orchestral flip of "Notorious Thugs" by The Notorious B.I.G. and Bone Thugs-n-Harmony from the former's album Life After Death (1997). The trailer was mostly positively received; writing for GQ, Grant Rindner labeled the trailer "glorious absurdity", stating it is "as glossy and over-the-top as recent features". He commended the return of racing scenes, saying it "restores the original feeling" of the films, and said the music was an "operatic nail-biter".

According to data from social media analytics company RelishMix, the film's Super Bowl trailer (dubbed "The Big Game Trailer") clocked 94.1 million views across social media in the 24-hour period following the game; it was the third most viewed trailer that aired at the event, behind Guardians of the Galaxy Vol. 3 (134.1 million views) and The Flash (97.4 million). It was the highest-viewed trailer which did not debut at the event, but its view count was down from the 110.9 million views received by F9's Super Bowl trailer in 2020, prior to that film's eventual delay. According to unnamed sources reporting to Variety, the first trailer accumulated an estimated 295 million views globally within the first 72 hours of release; Instagram drove nearly 30% of views, followed by TikTok (25%), Facebook (22%), YouTube (18%) and Twitter (6%), with a majority of viewership coming in from international territories. Fast X also trended as the top topic on Twitter in the U.S. immediately after the trailer debut. Similar to other Fast & Furious releases, Hot Wheels announced a themed basic assortment of cars set to feature in Fast X, which is set to be released with the film.

On March 14, 2023, the official theatrical poster was released; writing for Collider, Aidan King positively reviewed the poster, saying the vehicles placed around the characters are similar to a "high-octane drag race", indicating a return to the franchise's history as car-oriented films. He also noted the characters "loom above the drag [race] scene", referencing the franchise's thematic shift away from car culture. Two featurettes were released, first on March 31 and then on April 7, 2023, with the main cast giving a behind-the-scenes look (with previously unseen footage) at the production of the film. An additional featurette highlighting Diesel and Perry's characters was released on May 5, with the pair and Leterrier providing commentary.

On April 19, the second full-length trailer and the film's official synopsis was released; it was generally praised by critics for its action and Momoa's presentation. On May 2, a character trailer featuring Diesel and Rodriguez, titled "Fast X: Open Road", was released; writing for /Film, Bill Bria described it as "reflective". The trailer featured elements of Max Richter's "On the Nature of Daylight" and Dinah Washington's contributions from "This Bitter Earth", which Bria said "lent even more gravitas to the Dom/Letty highlight reel". He further praised the combination, stating "visuals so nakedly frivolous and music so achingly earnest" created "an exquisite tension". Two days later, the free to play 8-bit style game Fast X: Let's Race was launched online. The game features multiple top-down race courses set in the film's locations of Los Angeles, Rio de Janeiro, and Rome. Diesel and Rodriguez then appeared in promotional spots at the 2023 Miami Grand Prix, while in the United Kingdom, the film partnered with the Capital radio network to launch a competition for a listener to win a trip to Rome. The extended four and a half-minute final trailer was released on May 15.

On May 16, Philips announced a partnership with Universal Pictures in the Philippines, where one could win tickets alongside purchases of an Evnia gaming monitor. Universal also partnered with Frito-Lay's Ruffles to create limited-edition Fast X potato chips, which come with raffle tickets where fans could win a ticket; a lucky prize included the 2023 Dodge Charger R/T.

== Release ==
=== Theatrical ===
Fast X premiered on May 12, 2023, at the Colosseum in Rome. It was initially scheduled for release on April 2, 2021, but was postponed to April 7, 2023, and finally May 19. These shifts were reportedly made in response to the COVID-19 pandemic, which led to F9's eventual postponement to June 2021 that caused Fast X to be delayed. It was widely released in IMAX and other premium large formats including ScreenX. The film was cleared for release in China on March 28, 2023, marking one of the first large American films released in the country in 2023; Fast & Furious films have grossed over $1.2 billion in China since the release of Fast & Furious 6 (2013), and was one of the first countries where F9 (2021) was released, being five weeks ahead of its domestic release.

=== Home media ===
Fast X was released by Universal Pictures Home Entertainment on premium video on demand on June 9, 2023; on 4K Ultra HD, Blu-ray, and DVD on August 8; Physical copies contain an audio commentary, behind-the-scenes featurettes, a blooper reel, and two music videos. The film was made available to stream on Peacock on September 15, 2023.

== Reception ==
=== Box office ===
Fast X grossed $146.1 million in the United States and Canada, and $581.6 million in other territories, for a worldwide total of $727.7 million. Prior to its release, TheWrap estimated the film would need to gross $800–850 million worldwide in order to turn a profit during its theatrical run. Variety later reported that the film "barely crawled into the black" during its theatrical run, but would post a modest profit for the studio through home video sales and ancillary revenue streams. In a 2024 report by Forbes, Universal's share of the film's box office gross amounted to $357.2 million, representing a $20.8 million loss on the film's $378.8 million budget.

In the United States and Canada, tickets went on sale at midnight on February 9, 2023, a day prior to the premiere of the trailer. According to a Fandango study, which surveyed over 6,000 ticket buyers between February and March 2023, Fast X was revealed to be the sixth-most anticipated film of the summer. In April 2023, box office projections estimated that the film would gross $65–75 million in its opening weekend. By the week of its release, estimates had been lowered to $60 million. The film made $28 million on its first day, including $7.5 million from Thursday previews. It went on to debut to $67 million from 4,046 theaters, topping the box office. Writing for TheWrap, Jeremy Fuster predicted that Fast X may be less profitable than some of its predecessors, citing the film's sudden increased overall production budget (at 70% larger than F9) and the expected large marketing budget. In its second weekend, the film made $23 million (dropping 66%), finishing second behind newcomer The Little Mermaid. In its third weekend, Fast X finished in fourth place and made $9.2 million for a drop of 61% behind The Little Mermaid, The Boogeyman and Spider-Man: Across the Spider-Verse.

In the United Kingdom, tickets went on sale on May 5. The film was projected to gross around $280 million worldwide in its opening weekend, including about $220 million from 84 countries. Like its domestic debut, the film ended up slightly out-performing projections, making $252.7 million internationally and a total of $320 million worldwide. It was the sixth-best opening weekend for a studio film since 2019, and second-biggest non-superhero title (behind Avatar: The Way of Water). Its largest markets were China ($78 million), Mexico ($16 million), France ($9.6 million), and Brazil ($9.6 million). The film set records for the highest-opening weekend release for a foreign film in Pakistan, with 19.98 crore ($701,052).

It would remain Universal's twentieth highest-grossing film of all time worldwide until 2024 with the release of Wicked.

=== Critical response ===
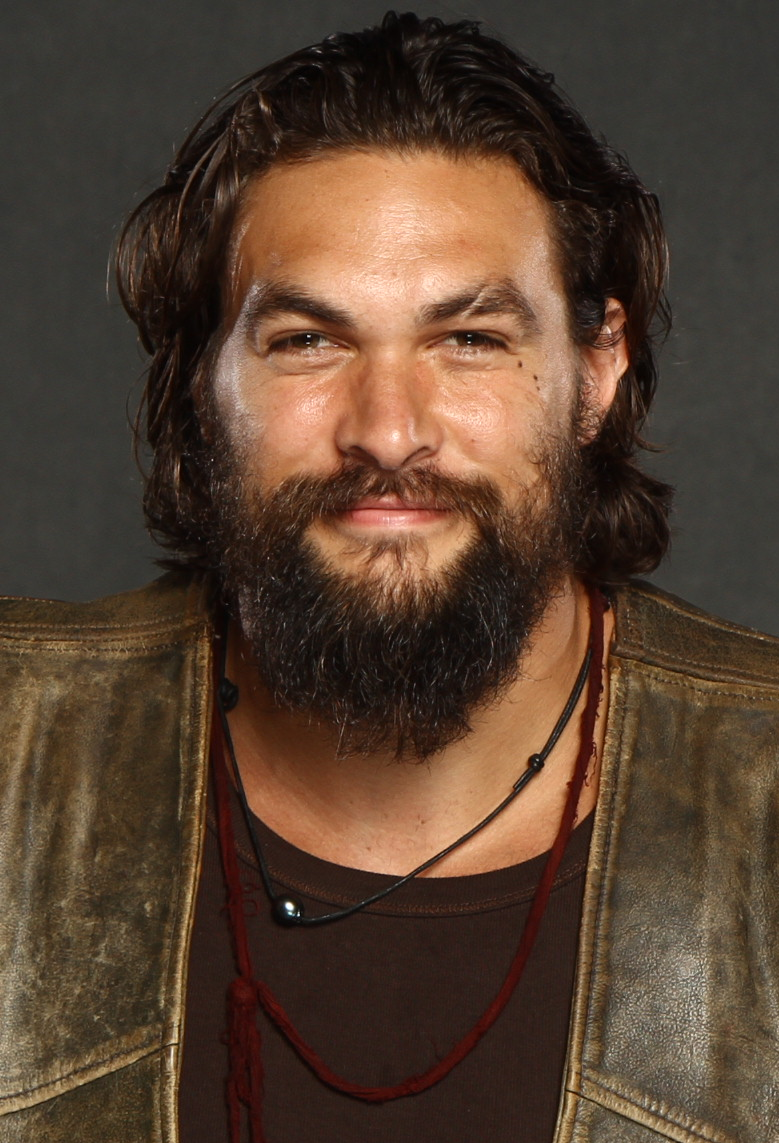
Despite mixed reception for the film, Jason Momoa's performance was praised by critics.

On the review aggregator website Rotten Tomatoes, 56% of 310 critics' reviews are positive, with an average rating of 5.7/10. The website's consensus reads: "As irredeemably silly as it is satisfyingly self-aware, Fast X should rev the engines of longtime fans while leaving many newcomers in neutral." Metacritic, which uses a weighted average, assigned the film a score of 56 out of 100, based on 59 critics, indicating "mixed or average" reviews. Audiences surveyed by CinemaScore gave the film an average grade of "B+" on an A+ to F scale, the same as F9 and the first film but below other installments. PostTrak reported filmgoers gave the film an 82% positive score, with 67% saying they would definitely recommend it.

Momoa's performance was widely praised by critics; Eric Eisenberg of CinemaBlend said Momoa "plays Dante like [the] Fast & Furious version of The Joker", concluding it was a "delightful" portrayal of a "gleeful psychopath". Liam Crowley of Comicbook seconded this view, calling Momoa "hilarious", while Screen Rant's Joseph Deckelmeier said Momoa brings "magic" to a performance which "oozes charisma". In a mixed review, Brian Truitt of USA Today also praised Momoa's performance but criticized the screenplay, saying, "Laws of physics are pummeled at length and all logic is shot out of a cannon [with] its bizarre character choices and decisions". The Chicago Sun-Times's Richard Roeper gave the film two out of four stars and was more critical of Momoa's performance, writing, "[He] comes across as more of a preening, performance-art, sociopathic clown than a truly menacing villain". Clarisse Loughrey of The Independent said that an "arbitrary" plot serves a "biblically-scaled soap opera [that] happily rewrites the laws of gravity and physiology to put a smile on its audience's faces", and praised the cast performances, namely Momoa's.

In a less positive review, Charles Pulliam-Moore of The Verge criticized the return of former characters, saying the film has "convoluted twists and turns" which contribute to making it feel "exciting, but airless". He also wrote the large cast made its characters "feel like souped-up cameos meant to remind you of the past rather than figures organically existing in the present—especially when they just pop up out of nowhere, which happens more often than you'd expect". He also criticized the screenplay, saying "[Dom and Dante's] conflict ends up feeling like something that was mapped out on paper, but was not crafted tightly enough for on-screen". This was echoed by Den of Geek's Don Kay, who lamented the lack of character beats for the supporting cast and the lack of stakes in the plot, although he praised Cena's performance, writing, "He plays to his comedic strengths and gets by on his sheer charisma". Johnny Oleksinski of the New York Post gave the film a one out of four rating, describing it as "another moronic Fast film that plods along like 99 Bottles of Beer on the Wall and features increasingly fake chases". James Verniere of the Boston Herald gave it a C+ and wrote, "Dimwitted takes on The Godfather films with street racers instead of gangsters".

Alison Willmore of Vulture criticized Leterrier's direction, writing the film "plays like it was made by an AI versed in the existing [films] but not quite up to spitting out something coherent itself" and called its plot "deliriously unwieldy". She also criticized its cast as being bloated and its dialogue as feeling "engineered to be clipped and used without context for promotional purposes", concluding watching Fast X "feels like sustaining a head injury". Writing for Slant, Greg Nussen criticized the acting performances and cinematography, calling it "overly lit [with] ultra-saturated images" and wrote that the film was "closer to fan fiction or self-parody than the real deal". Writing for The Wall Street Journal, Kyle Smith also criticized Leterrier's direction as overzealous, saying, "Leterrier rarely misses an opportunity to shred the storyline [to] end up with confetti, serving ridiculous action scenes [that] require much narrative corner-cutting".

In a scathing review, GameSpot's Phil Owen said the film possesses "blurry backgrounds and weird close-up shots", negatively comparing it to low-budget films, and called the editing "distractingly frenetic". He also said the storyline "just rehashed plot threads and set pieces from past [films]", criticized the ending, and called Diesel's performance a "full-on parody of himself: [he plays] a bland character". Kevin Maher of The Times called the film a "jaded and lackadaisical patch-up job", criticizing the cast performances, while Rolling Stone's Chris Vognar said that the cast (besides Momoa) "mailed [their] performances in" and called the film uninspiring, writing, "Fast X feels like it was written by a software program".

=== Accolades ===
Fast X was nominated in five categories at the 2023 Golden Trailer Awards: "Legacy Ride" (TRANSIT) for Best Action and Best Music, "Last Ride" (AV Squad) for Best Summer 2023 Blockbuster Trailer, "Clash" (TRANSIT) for Best Sound Editing in a TV Spot (for a Feature Film), and "Ensemble Shoot" (AV Squad) for Best Action/Thriller TrailerByte for a Feature Film. It won Best Action TV Spot (for a Feature Film) for "Ahead" (AV Squad). It became a runner-up for Best Supporting Actor (Momoa) and received a nomination for Best Stunts at the 6th Hollywood Critics Association Midseason Film Awards. The film garnered nominations for Best Music Supervision – Film and Best Soundtrack Album at the 14th Hollywood Music in Media Awards. At the 51st Saturn Awards, Fast X received nominations for Best Action or Adventure Film and Best Editing. It was nominated for Best Stunts at the 2nd Astra Film Creative Arts Awards. Diesel was nominated for Worst Actor at the 44th Golden Raspberry Awards.

== Sequel ==
After Fast X's release, Diesel announced plans for two sequels, depending on the film's performance. However, Leterrier did not confirm if the eleventh film would be the final installment. A standalone sequel starring Johnson and Momoa, titled Fast & Furious Presents: Hobbs & Reyes, was soon announced. Reports in May 2023 suggested that while Fast X would lead into the eleventh film, Fast X's budget and relatively modest box office performance meant that the sequel could be the franchise's last. In January 2024, it was rumored that the eleventh film would be "a throwback to the original" with a new antagonist, rather than Dante. Diesel confirmed in February 2024 that the eleventh film would be the franchise's last.

In May 2024, the film was delayed from April 4, 2025, to an unspecified date in 2026, and was delayed again in June 2025 to April 2027. Diesel later stated that Brian O'Conner would return in the eleventh film and it "will go back to the roots of the franchise", hinting a return to the franchise's street racing elements. However, in October 2025, The Wall Street Journal reported that the film could be canceled if its budget exceeds $200 million and that Universal sought to reduce the film's cast and stunts. That same month, Diesel stated that the film's budget issues were resolved and that production would begin by the end of the year, though planned spin-offs were put on hold. On January 30, 2026, the sequel's title was revealed as Fast Forever. It is set to be theatrically released on March 17, 2028, and will serve as the final main installment in the franchise. In March 2026, Michael Lesslie was hired as the film's screenwriter, replacing Zach Dean and Aaron Rabin. In August 2026, Diesel announced the screenplay was completed and that filming would begin that December.
