= Reach Out Worldwide =

American nonprofit organization

Reach Out Worldwide is a 501(c)(3) registered nonprofit founded in 2010 by Paul Walker that helps bring first responders to disaster areas to augment local relief efforts. Their teams typically consist of medical technicians, doctors, nurses, paramedics, firefighters, and construction workers. The group's goal is to air-drop into disaster zones the minute the news hits the wires. Paul Walker's brother, Cody Walker, is the current Chief Executive Officer of Reach Out Worldwide. Deployment Operations are run by the Incident Command and Director, Jill Ashlock.

Paul Walker organized a relief team in response to the 2010 Haiti earthquake, and, following their return, he founded Reach Out Worldwide to help fill the gap between available resources and the requirement for personnel in post-disaster situations. Reach Out Worldwide's work is mainly the result of volunteers that focus on quick deployments to areas that are small or remote and are often the first assistance a town or village sees. Domestically, they assist with clean up efforts ranging from mucking and gutting flood damaged homes, clearing access ways, and taking down damaged trees. Internationally, Reach Out Worldwide sends teams of medical and EMS professionals to provide medical aid and distribute supplies.

== Missions ==
Reach Out Worldwide has provided support in the following disasters:

Missions
Date	Disaster	Notes
September 2026	2026 Nepal-Tibet floods	Food, water, first aid
August 2026	Indiana, Ohio, Kentucky and West Virginia floods	Muck out, demo, water rescue, property recovery
June/July 2026	2026 Venezuela earthquakes	Cargo load, supply distribution
May 2026	Tornadoes in Lincoln County, Massachusetts and surrounding communities	Saw teams, debris removal, food distribution
March 2026	Tornado outbreak of 10-12 March, 2026	Debris removal, lot clearing, roof tarping
November – January 2026	Hurricane Melissa	Supply distribution, Starlink communication distribution, roof tarping, Norwood Basic School roof repair, home repair, new builds
July 2025	Tropical Storm Chantal	Muck and gut, debris removal
July 2025	July 2025 Central Texas floods	Supply and heavy equipment distribution, search and rescue, debris removal
April 2025	Kentucky Tornado outbreak and floods of April 2–7, 2025	Muck and gut, debris removal
February 2025	February 2025 North American storm complex	Muck and gut, debris removal
January – June 2025	2025 California wildfires	Supply distribution
December 2024	Park Fire	Supply distribution
October 2024	Hurricane Milton	Supply distribution, search and rescue, muck and gut
October 2024	Hurricane Helene	Search and rescue, supply distribution, muck and gut, home improvement
July 2024	Hurricane Beryl	Starlink communication device distribution
April 2024	February 2024 Texas wildfires	Infrastructure rebuild for Texan ranchers
December 2023	2023 Hendersonville tornado	Tree and debris removal, lot clearing
August 2023	2023 Hawaii wildfires	Immediate emergency supply distribution in August 2023, tree removal for replanting efforts in February 2024
April 2023	2023 Little Rock tornado	Tree removal, roof tarping, chainsaw, heavy equipment
March 2023	Tornado outbreak of March 24–27, 2023	Tree removal, roof tarping, chainsaw, heavy equipment
February 2023	2023 Turkey–Syria earthquakes	Search and rescue
September/October 2022	Hurricane Ian	Rescue, debris removal, muck and gut
December 2021	2021 Western Kentucky tornado	Tree and debris removal, muck and gut, chainsaw, heavy equipment
August – October 2021	Hurricane Ida	Debris removal, muck and gut, chainsaw, heavy equipment, home rebuild
August 2021	Siege of Kabul	Humanitarian aid
August 2021	2021 Tennessee floods	Debris removal, muck and gut
June 2021	Tropical Storm Claudette	Tree and debris removal, chainsaw, heavy equipment
April 2021	Nashville floods	Debris removal, muck and gut
March 2021	Tornado outbreak sequence of March 24–28, 2021	Tree and debris removal, roof tarping
September 2020 – February 2021	West Coast wildfires	Immediate emergency supply distribution
September 2020	Hurricane Laura	Debris removal, recovery
August 2020	2020 Midwest derecho	Supply contribution
March 2020	Tennessee Tornado outbreak of March 2–3, 2020	Tree and debris removal, roof tarping
January 2020	Australia bushfires	Ash out, tree and debris removal
September – November 2019	Tropical Storm Imelda	Muck and gut, home rebuilding
September 2019	Hurricane Dorian	Medical, supply distribution, resource coordination, debris removal, muck and gut
June 2019	2019 Arkansas River floods	Debris removal, muck and gut
May 2019	Tornado outbreak of May 20–23, 2019	Tree and debris removal, roof tarping, resource coordination
March 2019	Alabama Tornado outbreak of March 3, 2019	Chainsaw, debris removal
December 2018/ January 2019	2018 California wildfires	Supply distribution
October 2018	Hurricane Michael	Chainsaw, debris removal
October 2018	2018 Sulawesi earthquake and tsunami	Medical, water filtration
September 2018	Hurricane Florence	Rescue, debris removal, muck and gut
June 2018	2018 Volcán de Fuego eruption	Medical, home building
September/October 2017	Hurricane Maria	Debris and tree removal
September 2017	Hurricane Irma	Search and rescue, debris removal
September/October 2017	Hurricane Harvey	Water and supply distribution, debris removal, medical
March 2017	Arkansas-Missouri Flood	Muck and gut
January 2017	Georgia's Tornado outbreak of January 21–23, 2017	Tree and debris removal
December 2016	2016 Great Smoky Mountains wildfires	Ash out, debris and tree removal
October 2016	Hurricane Matthew	Medical
March 2016 - September 2016	2016 Louisiana floods	Muck and gut
February 2016	Cyclone Winston	Medical
October 2015	October 2015 North American storm complex	Muck and gut
June 2015	2015 Texas–Oklahoma flood and tornado outbreak	Tree and debris removal
April 2015	April 2015 Nepal earthquake	Medical
March 2015	Cyclone Pam	Medical
February 2015	January 2015 North American blizzard	Snow removal
April 2014	Arkansas Tornado outbreak of April 27–30, 2014	Tree and debris removal
November 2013	Typhoon Yolanda	Medical
November 2013	Typhoon Haiyan	Medical
November 2013	2013 Washington, Illinois tornado	Tree and debris removal
October 2013	2013 Colorado floods	Tree, debris and mud removal
May 2013	2013 El Reno tornado	Tree and debris removal
December 2011	Tropical Storm Washi	Medical
October 2010	2010 Mentawai earthquake and tsunami	Medical
March 2010	2010 Chile earthquake	Medical
January 2010	2010 Haiti earthquake	Medical

=== April 2015 Nepal Earthquake ===
This was the first mission led by Cody Walker following the death of Paul Walker. The nine-member mobile disaster medical team consisted of one doctor and several local firefighter-paramedics, including one from the Orange County Fire Authority and three from the Pasadena Fire Department. Reach Out Worldwide treated 400 cases in 96 hours in rural villages cut off from supplies due to dangerous roads.

==== Game4Paul ====
Reach Out Worldwide held the charity event Game4Paul on May 9, 2015, raising over $100,000 in fundraising. This event has subsequently been held in September 2016 (raising over $130,000), October 2017, and October 2018. In 2017, Microsoft released a limited edition Xbox One to raffle with all proceeds going to Reach Out Worldwide. In 2018 Microsoft partnered with Reach Out Worldwide for Game4Paul again.
