= Paul Walker =

American actor (1973–2013)

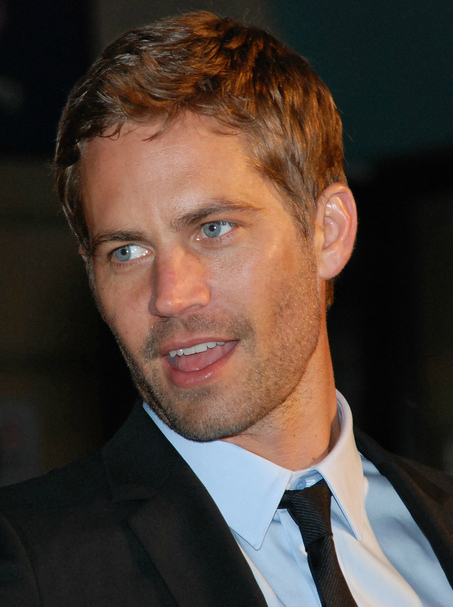
- Walker in 2009
- Born: Paul William Walker IV; September 12, 1973; Glendale, California, U.S.
- Died: November 30, 2013 (aged 40); Santa Clarita, California, U.S.
- Burial place: Forest Lawn Memorial Park; Hollywood Hills, California, U.S.
- Occupation: Actor
- Years active: 1975–2013
- Children: Meadow Walker
- Relatives: Cody Walker (brother)

Paul William Walker IV (September 12, 1973 – November 30, 2013) was an American actor. He was best known for his role as Brian O'Conner in the Fast & Furious franchise (2001–2015).

Walker began his career as a child actor in the 1980s, gaining recognition in the 1990s after appearing in the television soap opera The Young and the Restless; he received praise for his performances in the teen comedy She's All That and the comedy-drama Varsity Blues (both 1999), and rose to international fame by starring in The Fast and the Furious (2001).

He also starred in the commercially successful road thriller Joy Ride (2001), becoming an action star. He followed this with the box-office disappointments Into the Blue (2005) and Running Scared (2006). However, he earned praise for his performance in the survival drama Eight Below and for his portrayal of Hank Hansen in Flags of Our Fathers (both 2006). Outside of these, Walker largely appeared in low-budget action films, but starred in the commercially successful heist film Takers (2010).

Walker died in a single-vehicle collision on November 30, 2013, as a passenger in a speeding Porsche Carrera GT. His father and daughter filed separate wrongful death lawsuits against Porsche, which resulted in settlements. At the time of his death, Walker had not completed filming Furious 7 (2015); it was released after rewrites and stand-ins, including his brothers Cody and Caleb, were used to complete the film while the song "See You Again" by Wiz Khalifa and Charlie Puth was commissioned as a tribute.

== Early life and education ==
Paul William Walker IV was born on September 12, 1973, in Glendale, California, a suburb of Los Angeles. His mother, Cheryl (née Crabtree), was a fashion model, and his father, Paul William Walker III, was a sewer contractor and former amateur boxer who was a two-time Golden Gloves champion. Walker's paternal grandfather, William, had a short-lived boxing career as "Irish" Billy Walker and raced factory cars for Ford in the 1960s.

Walker had four younger siblings: Aimee, Ashlie, Caleb, and Cody. He spent most of his early life in the Sunland neighborhood of Los Angeles and graduated from high school at Village Christian School in 1991. He later attended several community colleges in Southern California, majoring in marine biology.

== Career ==
=== 1975-1985: Early career in commercials and television ===
Walker began a modeling career as a toddler, starring in a television commercial for Pampers at age two. He continued to appear in commercials, most notably for Showbiz Pizza in 1984, before beginning an acting career on television that year, appearing in the teen anthology series CBS Schoolbreak Special. Walker continued to work in television until 1996, across several genres; he appeared in two episodes of the fantasy drama Highway to Heaven between 1984 and 1986, and secured his first leading role in 1986, appearing as Jeremy Beatty in the sitcom Throb. He continued to feature on sitcoms in the early 1990s, with guest roles in Charles in Charge, Who's the Boss?, and the short-lived What a Dummy. In 1993, he portrayed Brandon Collins on the soap opera The Young and the Restless; he and co-star Heather Tom, who played Victoria Newman, gained fame and were nominated for Outstanding Lead Actor and Actress in a Soap Opera at the Youth in Film Awards. Walker's final television role was on Touched by an Angel, although he appeared as himself, alongside his sister Ashlie, as contestants on a 1988 episode of the game show I'm Telling!, in which they finished in second place.

=== 1986-2000: Transition to film ===
Walker began his film career in 1986, appearing mainly in low-budget B films. His first role was in the horror comedy Monster in the Closet, and a year later, he starred in The Retaliator (retroactively subtitled Programmed to Kill), a science fiction film. In 1994, he returned to film, starring in Tammy and the T-Rex, but secured his first feature film role in the comedy Meet the Deedles in 1998; although commercially and critically unsuccessful, it allowed Walker to secure supporting roles in the films Pleasantville (1998), Varsity Blues (1999), She's All That (1999), and The Skulls (2000).

"[Walker] is that guy. As a director, [Walker is] completely supportive of my vision of what the film is. And even better, he's completely game for it."

— Wayne Kramer, who directed and cast Walker in Running Scared (2006).

=== 2001-2003: Breakthrough and international fame ===
In 2001, Walker's breakthrough role was starring opposite Vin Diesel in the action film The Fast and the Furious; it was commercially successful, and subsequently launched a media franchise. The film also established Walker as a film star and leading man, as his performance garnered the MTV Movie Award for Best On-Screen Team (shared with Diesel) in 2002. Walker starred in the critically successful thriller Joy Ride (2001). Walker was originally set to play Jim Street in S.W.A.T. (2003) and had even started training for the part, but backed out to reprise his role as Brian O'Conner in the 2003 sequel 2 Fast 2 Furious, along with the short film The Turbo Charged Prelude for 2 Fast 2 Furious. The role of Jim Street went to Colin Farrell.

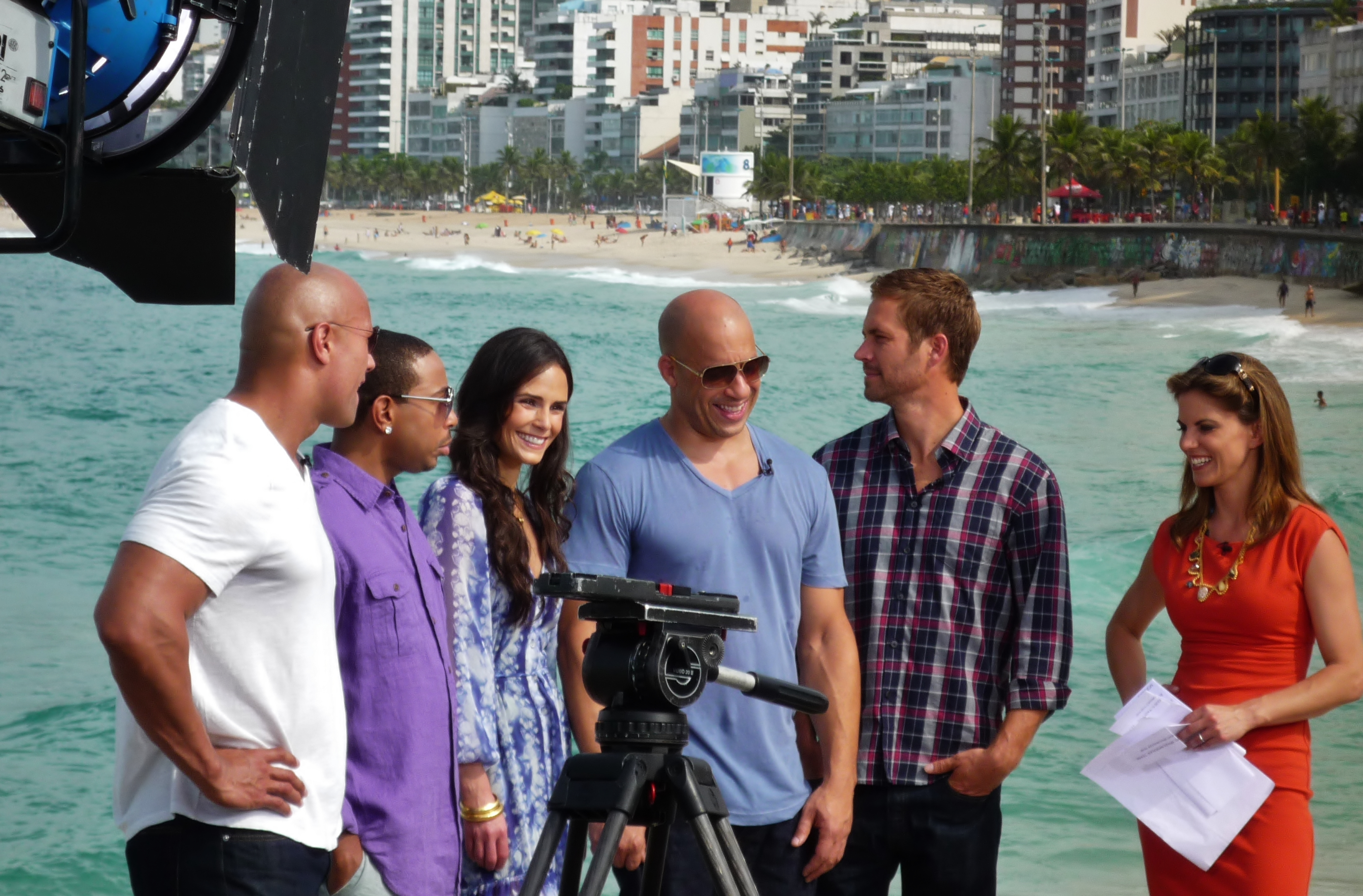
Picture of Fast Five cast (from left) Dwayne Johnson, Ludacris, Jordana Brewster, Vin Diesel, and Walker with Natalie Morales for NBC's Today Show taken in April 2011

=== 2004-2008: Starring in low-budget films ===
After this, Walker starred in either in low-budget or commercially unsuccessful films for a time, notably Noel (2004) and Into the Blue (2005). Walker portrayed Hank Hansen in Clint Eastwood's war film Flags of Our Fathers (2006) and starred in the survival drama Eight Below, both released in 2006. Eight Below garnered critical acclaim and opened in first place at the box office, grossing over US$20 million during its opening weekend. Walker then starred in the independent film The Lazarus Project, which was released on DVD on October 21, 2008.

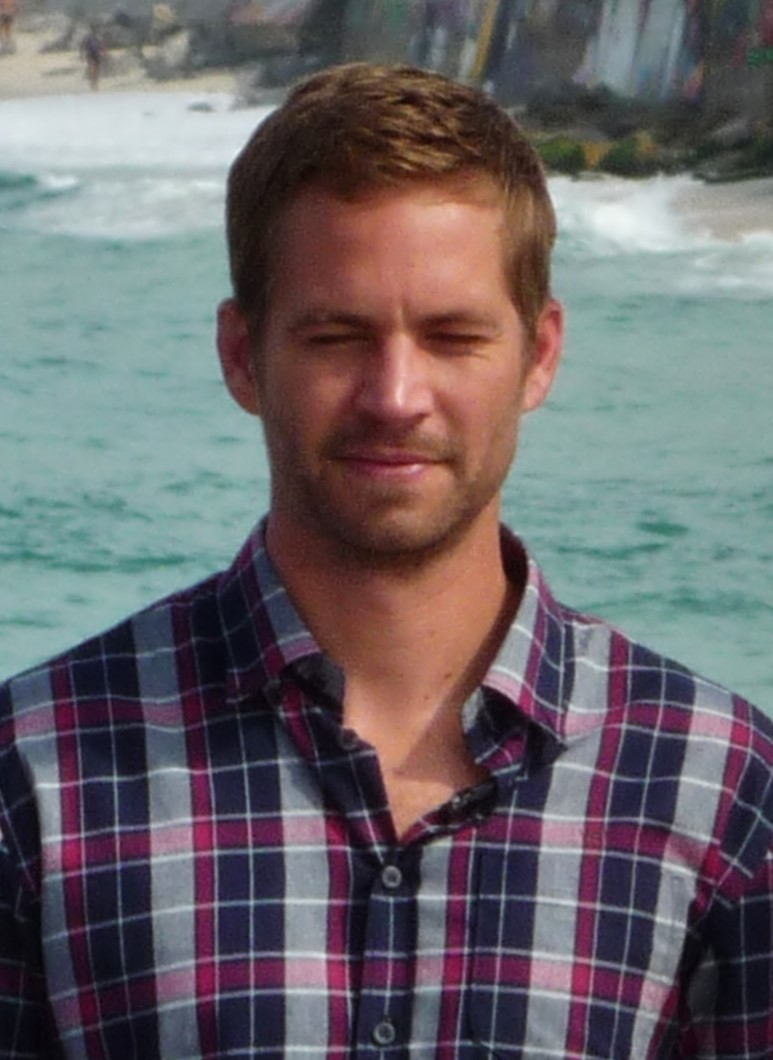
Walker in 2011

=== 2009-2013: Return to the Fast & Furious franchise and producing debut ===
Despite initial reluctance, Walker reprised his role as Brian O'Conner after six years, in Fast & Furious (2009). The film became the highest-grossing film in the franchise up until that point. He then reprised his role in the fifth (2011) and sixth (2013) installments of the franchise, which were commercially successful, while his performances were praised. Walker also reprised his role in an episode in the talk-show Conan, which was released on May 9, 2013. Walker was nominated for Choice Movie Actor – Action at the 2011 Teen Choice Awards for the former, and nominated for Choice Movie: Chemistry (with Diesel and Dwayne Johnson) and won his second MTV Movie Award for Best On-Screen Duo with Diesel for the latter. Walker also starred in the heist film Takers (2010), and returned to modeling in 2011, appearing as the face of fragrance brand Cool Water. In 2012, he founded the film production company Laguna Ridge Pictures, which signed a first-look deal with Fast & Furious distributor Universal Pictures. In 2013, Walker made his debut as an executive producer with the thriller film Vehicle 19 and went on to produce the crime comedy film Pawn Shop Chronicles.

=== 2013-2015: Final films and planned film roles ===
After he died in 2013, three films starring Walker were released; the thriller film Hours (2013), which he also served as an executive producer, and in the action film Brick Mansions (2014), itself a remake of the French film District 13 (2004). He also starred in Furious 7 (2015), but died before he had wrapped up filming. It was originally set to release in 2014, but was pushed back to recreate Walker's likeness. At the time of his death, he had completed about half of his scenes in the movie. The filmmakers hired Peter Jackson's Weta Digital visual effects house to recreate Walker's likeness for the remaining scenes. To complete Walker's unfinished performance, the filmmakers created approximately 350 visual effects shots. About 90 shots used outtakes and archive footage of Walker from previous Fast & Furious films, which underwent digital relighting and compositing to seamlessly integrate them into newly filmed scenes, while the remaining 260 shots featured his brothers, Caleb and Cody Walker, along with co-star John Brotherton, as stand-ins. The film was released in 2015. Walker posthumously won the award for Choice Movie Actor: Action at the 2015 Teen Choice Awards, and was nominated for Choice Movie: Chemistry (shared with Diesel, Johnson, Michelle Rodriguez, Tyrese Gibson, and Ludacris). Brick Mansions (2014) and Furious 7 (2015) were dedicated to Walker's memory.

Walker was also set to play Dawson Cole in the romantic drama film The Best of Me (2014) and Agent 47 in the video game adaptation film Hitman: Agent 47 (2015) after wrapping up production of Furious 7 (2015), but died before both productions began. His roles went to James Marsden and Rupert Friend, respectively. It was later revealed Walker declined the role of Superman in Superman Returns (2006), allegedly due to the "Superman curse" and the celebrity associated with the role.

== Personal life ==
Raised in a Mormon household, Walker became a non-denominational Christian as an adult. He lived in Santa Barbara with his dogs. He and Rebecca Soteros, a childhood friend with whom he had an on-and-off relationship, had a daughter, Meadow Rain Walker. Meadow lived with her mother in Hawaii for 13 years and, in 2011, moved to California to live with Walker. Vin Diesel, Walker's close friend, is Meadow's godfather. At the time of his death, Walker was in a relationship with Jasmine Pilchard-Gosnell, whom he began dating when she was 16 and he was 33.

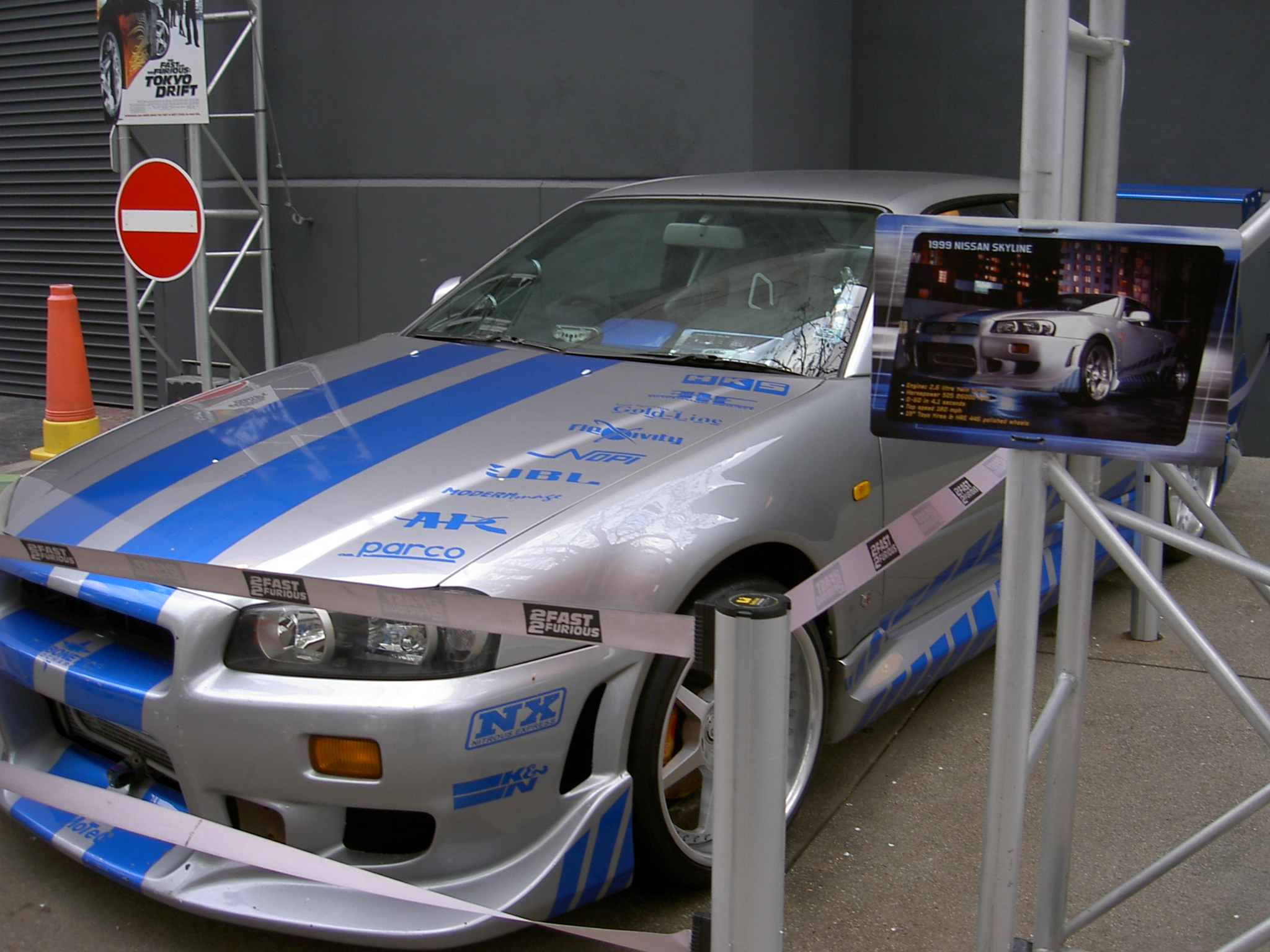
Walker drove a R34 Nissan Skyline GT-R V-Spec in 2 Fast 2 Furious. He later owned the car.

In addition to Diesel, Walker was also close friends with fellow Fast & Furious co-star Tyrese Gibson.

He held a brown belt in Brazilian jiu-jitsu under Ricardo "Franjinha" Miller at Paragon Jiu-Jitsu and was awarded his black belt by Miller posthumously. Walker founded the humanitarian aid nonprofit charity Reach Out Worldwide (ROWW) with financial adviser Roger Rodas in response to the 2010 Haiti earthquake. He traveled to a number of disaster-stricken areas to supply aid until his death.

Walker had an interest in marine biology, and joined the board of directors of The Billfish Foundation in 2006. He fulfilled a lifelong dream by starring in the National Geographic Channel series Expedition Great White (retroactively retitled Shark Men), which premiered in June 2010. Walker spent 11 days catching and tagging seven great white sharks off the coast of Mexico. The expedition, led by Chris Fischer, founder and CEO of Fischer Productions, and Brett McBride and Michael Domeier of the Marine Conservation Science Institute, took measurements, gathered DNA samples, and fastened real-time satellite tags to the sharks to study migratory patterns, especially those associated with mating and birthing, over five years.

A car enthusiast, Walker competed in the Redline Time Attack racing series, racing on the AE Performance Team in a BMW E92 M3. His car was sponsored by Etnies, Brembo, Öhlins, Volk, OS Giken, Hankook, Gintani, and Reach Out Worldwide. He had been preparing for an auto show prior to his death. Walker owned Always Evolving, a Valencia high-end vehicle performance shop, where Rodas, a pro-am racer, served as CEO. Walker had a large collection of about 30 cars, a portion of which he co-owned with Rodas. In January 2020, 21 vehicles owned by Walker were sold for a combined $2.33 million during spirited bidding at an annual car auction in Arizona.

== Death ==
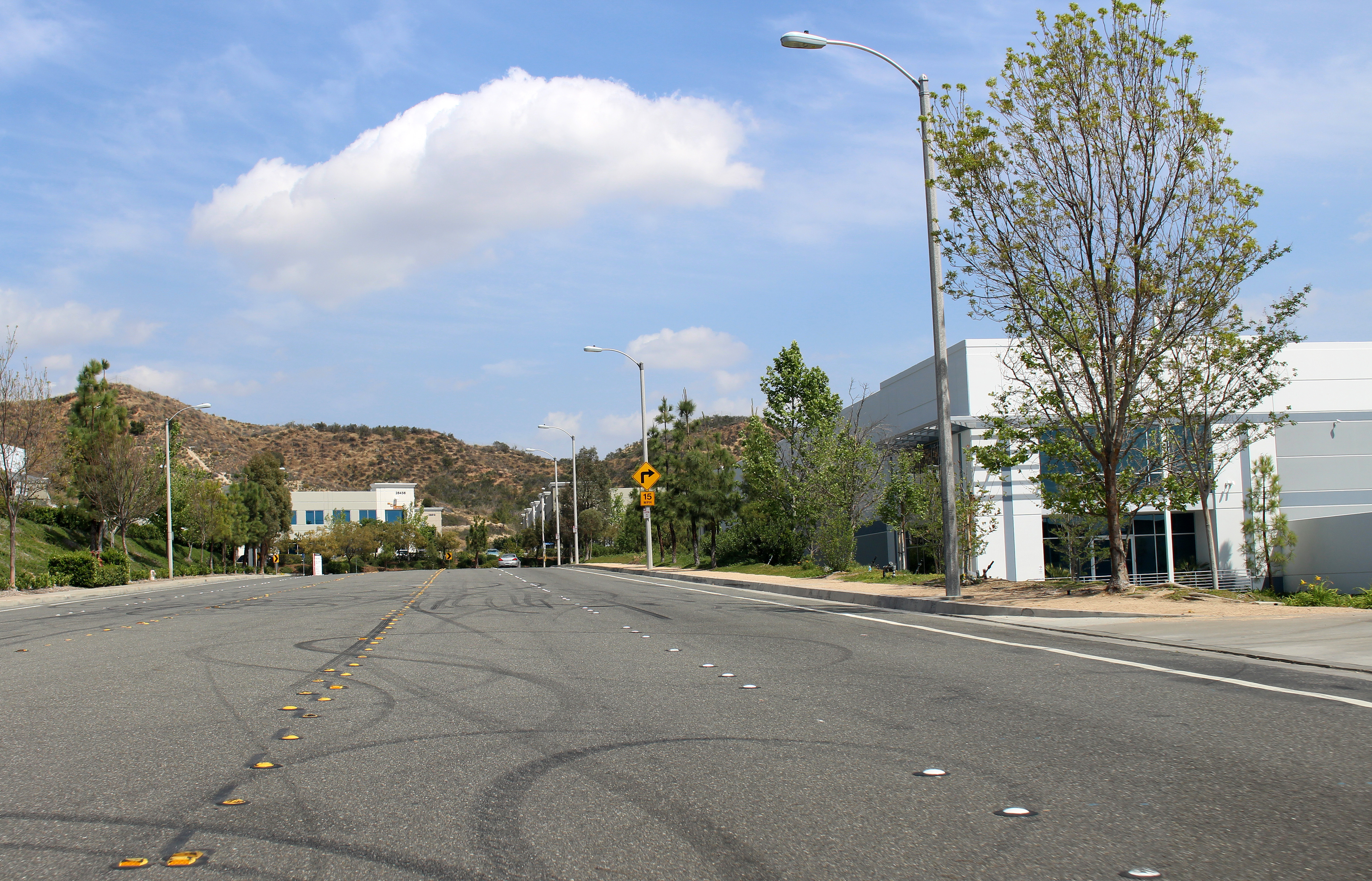
The site of Walker's death on Hercules Street in Santa Clarita, 2015

On November 30, 2013, at about 3:30 p.m. PST, Walker, 40, and Roger Rodas, 38, left an event for Walker's charity Reach Out Worldwide for victims of Typhoon Haiyan, with Rodas driving his red 2005 Porsche Carrera GT. Traveling between 80 mph (130 km/h) and 93 mph (150 km/h) in a 45 mph (72 km/h) speed zone on Hercules Street in Valencia, a neighborhood of Santa Clarita, California, Rodas lost control of the car, which crashed into a concrete lamp post and two trees, catching fire within seconds after impact. Forensic evidence indicated that both men were knocked unconscious by the impact. Rodas died instantly from multiple traumatic injuries, while Walker died within seconds from the combined effects of trauma and burns. Both bodies were burned beyond recognition.

The curve where Walker and Rodas died is a popular spot for drifting cars. No alcohol or other drugs were found in either man's system, and neither mechanical failure nor road conditions appeared to play a role. Police found no evidence of drag racing. The investigation concluded that the car’s speed and the age of its tires were the primary causes of the crash.

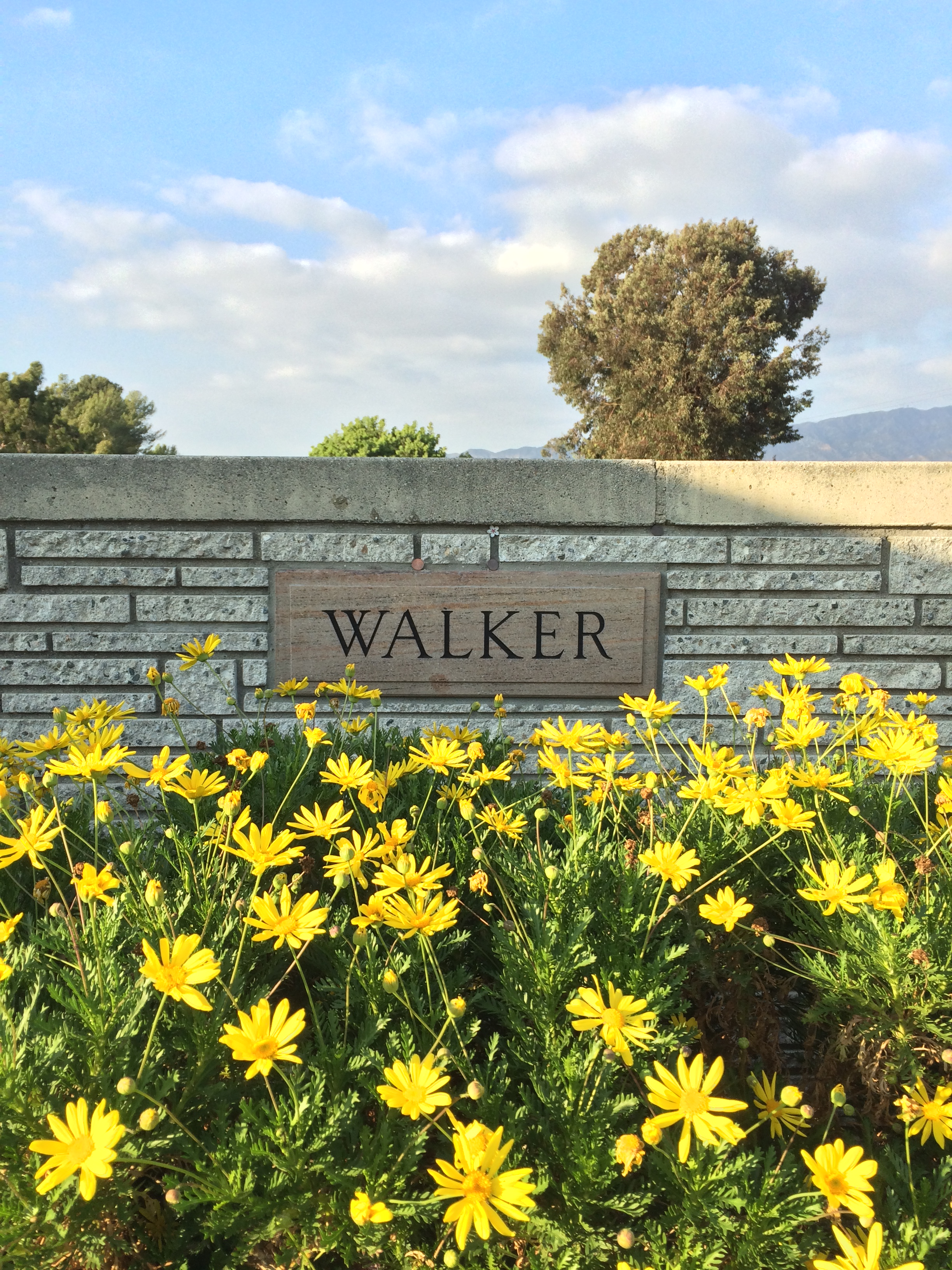
Grave of Paul Walker at Forest Lawn Hollywood Hills

With Furious 7 in the middle of filming at the time of Walker's death, Universal announced an indeterminate hiatus on the production, citing a desire to speak with his family before determining how to proceed with the film.

Numerous friends and movie stars posted tributes to Walker on social media. His remains were cremated, and his ashes were buried in a non-denominational ceremony at Forest Lawn Memorial Park. His life was later chronicled in the documentary I Am Paul Walker, released on August 11, 2018.

=== Lawsuits ===
In December 2014, Walker's father filed a wrongful death claim against Rodas's estate, seeking the return of "a proportionate share" of revenue generated by a group of automobiles that were jointly owned by both Walker and Rodas. Walker's daughter received a $10.1M settlement in 2016.

In September 2015, Walker's daughter filed a wrongful death lawsuit against Porsche, claiming that the Porsche Carrera GT had numerous design defects, including a history of instability, and that its seat belt placement could cause harm upon impact. Porsche denied any wrongdoing and blamed Walker, stating: "The perils, risk, and danger were open and obvious and known to him, and he chose to conduct himself in a manner to expose himself to such perils, dangers, and risks, thus assuming all the risks involved in using the vehicle." Walker's father and daughter both reached separate out-of-court settlements with Porsche. In April 2016, U.S. District Court Judge Philip S. Gutierrez ruled in favor of Porsche in a separate lawsuit filed by Rodas's widow Kristine.

== Legacy and posthumous recognition ==
=== Film legacy and recognition ===
Following his death, Walker's legacy continued through various tributes and recognitions. The final scene of Furious 7 (2015), accompanied by the song "See You Again" by Wiz Khalifa featuring Charlie Puth, was widely viewed as a farewell to his character Brian O'Conner and Walker himself, and became closely associated with his legacy. As a tribute to Walker, his character Brian O'Conner was kept alive within the Fast & Furious universe rather than killed off, remaining referenced in later installments and making an off-screen cameo in his signature car at the end of F9 (2021). Walker also appeared posthumously via archival footage in a flashback scene from Fast Five (2011) in Fast X (2023).

A documentary about his life, I Am Paul Walker, was released in 2018, and he was posthumously nominated to receive a star on the Hollywood Walk of Fame in 2022.

=== Reach Out Worldwide and The Paul Walker Foundation ===
In January 2014, his brother Cody Walker joined Reach Out Worldwide (ROWW), helping continue his late brother's humanitarian work through the disaster-relief organization Walker founded in 2010. On September 12, 2015, what would have been Walker's 42nd birthday, his daughter Meadow Walker founded The Paul Walker Foundation in his memory, supporting ocean conservation through grants and educational initiatives.

== Awards and nominations ==
Year	Award	Category	Nominated work	Result
2002	MTV Movie Award	Best On-Screen Team	The Fast and the Furious	Won (Note: Shared with Vin Diesel)
2002	MTV Movie Award	Best Breakthrough Performance - Male	The Fast and the Furious	Nominated
2011	Teen Choice Awards	Choice Movie Actor – Action	Fast Five	Nominated
2013	Teen Choice Awards	Choice Movie: Chemistry	Fast & Furious 6	Nominated (Note: Shared with Vin Diesel and Dwayne Johnson)
2014	MTV Movie Award	Best On-Screen Duo	Fast & Furious 6	Won
2015	Teen Choice Awards	Choice Movie Actor: Action	Furious 7 (posthumously)	Won
2015	Teen Choice Awards	Choice Movie: Chemistry	Furious 7 (posthumously)	Nominated (Note: Shared with Vin Diesel, Michelle Rodriguez, Tyrese Gibson, Dwayne Johnson, Ludacris)
