= USS Indianapolis: Men of Courage =

2016 film by Mario Van Peebles (Does not recount specific details of film.)

- Official release poster
- Directed by: Mario Van Peebles
- Written by: Cam Cannon; Richard Rionda Del Castro
- Produced by: Michael Mendelsohn; Richard Rionda Del Castro
- Starring: Nicolas Cage; Tom Sizemore; Thomas Jane; James Remar; Matt Lanter; Brian Presley; Cody Walker
- Cinematography: Andrzej Sekuła
- Edited by: Robert A. Ferretti
- Music by: Laurent Eyquem
- Production companies: Hannibal Classics; Patriot Pictures
- Distributed by: Saban Films
- Release dates: August 24, 2016 (Philippines); October 14, 2016 (United States)
- Running time: 130 minutes
- Country: United States
- Language: English
- Budget: $40 million
- Box office: $1,663,785

USS Indianapolis: Men of Courage (also titled USS Indianapolis: Disaster in the Philippine Sea) is a 2016 American war disaster film directed by Mario Van Peebles and written by Cam Cannon and Richard Rionda Del Castro, based largely on the true story of the loss of the ship of the same name in the closing stages of World War II. The film stars Nicolas Cage, Tom Sizemore, Thomas Jane, Matt Lanter, Brian Presley, and Cody Walker. Principal photography began on June 19, 2015, in Mobile, Alabama.

The film premiered in the Philippines on August 24, 2016. It was released as a digital rental on iTunes and Amazon in the United States on October 14, 2016, and in limited theaters during the Veterans Day weekend. The film underperformed at the box office and received negative reviews from critics.

== Plot ==
In 1945, the Portland-class heavy cruiser USS Indianapolis, commanded by Captain Charles B. McVay III, delivers parts of the atomic bomb that would later be used to bomb Hiroshima at the end of World War II. While crossing the Philippine Sea, on July 30, 1945, the unescorted ship is torpedoed and sunk by the Imperial Japanese Navy (IJN) submarine I-58, taking 300 crewmen with it to the bottom of the Philippine Sea, and the rest climb out of the ship and were left stranded at sea for five days without food and water in shark-infested waters.

With no hope for five days, most of the remaining crewmembers are eaten by sharks or die of salt water poisoning by drinking seawater, which also caused some of those injured to die from seasickness and infectious wounds. Others swim off from their groups after hallucinating a non-existent island, never to be seen again. On the fifth day, the surviving crew are spotted by a PBY Catalina, and rescue later arrives. Only 316 survived the disaster.

Looking for a scapegoat for its own gross negligence, the US Navy court-martials and convicts Captain McVay for "hazarding his ship by failing to zigzag." Despite having been found not guilty by overwhelming evidence supporting McVay, as well as testimony from the former captain of the IJN's I-58 submarine, Captain McVay, already under pressure by the media and from the deceased crewmen's relatives, committed suicide in 1968. The movie's postscript states that Captain McVay was posthumously exonerated of all charges by President Bill Clinton in 2000.

While the credits roll, two Navy sailors recount the sharks in the waters, and real footage of the rescue is shown, along with many still shots of lost sailors.

== Cast ==
- Nicolas Cage as Captain Charles B. McVay III
- Tom Sizemore as Chief Petty Officer McWhorter
- Thomas Jane as Lieutenant Adrian Marks
- Matt Lanter as Petty Officer First Class Brian "Bama" Smithwick
- James Remar as Rear Admiral William S. Parnell
- Brian Presley as Waxman
- Yutaka Takeuchi as Commander Mochitsura Hashimoto
- Johnny Wactor as Connor
- Adam Scott Miller as Mike D'Antonio
- Cody Walker as Petty Officer Third Class West
- Callard Harris as Lieutenant Standish
- Mandela Van Peebles as Theodore
- Craig Tate as Garrison
- Joey Capone as Alvin
- Emily Tennant as Clara
- Shamar Sanders as Quinn
- Max Ryan as Lieutenant Wilbur "Chuck" Gwinn
- Patrice Cols as Jean-Pierre
- Currie Graham as Captain Ryan, Prosecutor In McVay's Court Martial.
- Matthew Pearson as "Deuce"
- Timothy Patrick Cavanaugh as Commander Cavanaugh
- Jose Julian as Sanchez
- Weronika Rosati as Louise, McVay's Wife
- Mattie Liptak as Paul
- Justin Nesbitt as Lindy

== Production ==
=== Development ===
The project USS Indianapolis: Men of Courage, set in July 1945, is about the Navy ship USS Indianapolis and was first announced in 2011 by Hannibal Classics. Near the end of World War II, when the ship was returning from the US base on the island of Tinian after delivering important parts for the atomic bomb known as Little Boy, it was torpedoed by I-58. Only 317 of the 1,197 people on board the ship survived to be rescued; almost 300 went down with the ship, and more than 500 who survived the sinking were killed by dehydration, exposure, salt water poisoning, or shark attacks over the next five days. Cam Cannon and Richard Rionda Del Castro, the latter also being engaged as a producer, wrote the script for the film. The focus of the film is on the bravery of the crewmen aboard Indianapolis.

On December 17, 2013, Hannibal set Mario Van Peebles to direct the film, and Patriot Pictures would finance and Rionda Del Castro would produce along with Michael Mendelsohn. The studio (Hannibal) had developed the film in five years by consulting the survivors of the disaster, including the US Navy and the US Coast Guard. The US Navy helped with the completion and finalization of the last draft of the script.

Walt Conti of Edge Innovations provided the animated sharks, and the production reportedly secured two fully-operational World War II-era warbirds to portray the airplanes that were involved in the real rescue operations after the disaster. Silo Inc. and Hydroflex were attached to handle digital effects and underwater filming for the film, respectively. The battleship USS Alabama and USS Drum, preserved as museum ships at the Battleship Memorial Park near Mobile, Alabama, were used to depict Indianapolis and the Japanese submarine.

The film is dedicated to the men of the USS Indianapolis and their families.

=== Pre-production ===
On February 5, 2015, Nicolas Cage was set to play the lead role of Captain Charles McVay in the film.

Matt Lanter was set on April 1, 2015, to play a US Navy diver, named Chief Petty Officer Brian "Bama" Smithwick. Lanter revealed to the producers after his audition that his grandfather, Kenley Lanter, was a Signalman on Indianapolis. Furthermore, Lanter's father, Joe Lanter, is a chairman of Second Watch, an organization of survivors and their families. Joe Lanter and his co-chair, Maria Bullard, stayed in contact with the producers during pre-production and were welcomed to the set during photography.

On May 13, 2015, Variety revealed that Tom Sizemore, Thomas Jane and Brian Presley had also joined the cast of the film, in which Sizemore would play McWhorter, one of the crew on the ship, while Jane was to play the pilot Chuck Gwinn.

In May 2015, Saban Films acquired the North American distribution rights to the film. On May 18, 2015, Sizemore's role was confirmed by Variety.

On July 15, 2015, Cody Walker was cast in the film to play one of the crewmen aboard the ship.

=== Filming ===
Principal photography on the film began on June 19, 2015, in Mobile, Alabama with many scenes shot aboard the battleship USS Alabama. Filming was also to take place in San Francisco and Kyoto, Japan, but the producers later opted to double Mobile for both San Francisco and Japan. On June 27, 2015, filming was underway in Orange Beach.

A World War II-era vintage PBY-6A Catalina amphibious seaplane was being used for the filming on June 29, 2015, when it took on water and beached near the Flora-Bama lounge, Orange Beach. There were no injuries during the incident, and the rescue team secured the pilot and co-pilot. Producers had to put the production on hold temporarily to save the plane, but "the salvage company was unable to save the aircraft," which was broken apart, according to the producers. The plane was provided by firefighters from Washington and was being piloted by Fred and Jayson Owen.

After filming on July 14 in downtown Mobile, Cage met a real Navy veteran named Richard Stephens on a bench at Bienville Square. Stephens was one of the survivors of the ship, so Cage and Stephens had an extended discussion about the disaster.

== Reception ==
On review aggregator Rotten Tomatoes the film holds an approval rating of 17% based on 12 reviews, with an average rating of 3.4/10. On Metacritic, the film has a weighted average score of 30 out of 100, based on eight critics, indicating "generally unfavorable reviews".

Frank Scheck of The Hollywood Reporter referred to the movie as "slapdash", and called the special effects "garish and unconvincing"; the movie's sharks he thought were "Sharknado-style". Glenn Kenny of RogerEbert.com thought, just as Scheck and many other reviewers did, that such a "harrowing" story would have been adapted to the screen far earlier. His consensus was the film was "not exactly unwatchable", but also "completely not worthy of watching", with its "lazy inattention to period detail", summing it up as "two-hours plus of bumbling and pandering".

Neil Genzlinger of The New York Times criticized the film's "lack of subtlety" in dealing with such an "almost unbelievable" story. He called the characters' storylines away from the main plot "flimsy" and the special effects "rickety", and noted that the film's "leaden" treatment of the central story "suck[ed] all the drama out of it".
