= Meadow Walker =

American model (born 1998)

- Born: Meadow Rain Walker; November 4, 1998 (age 28)
- Occupations: Model; actress
- Years active: 2016–present
- Spouse: Louis Thornton-Allan (m. 2021; div. 2024)
- Parents: Paul Walker (father); Rebecca Soteros (mother)
- Relatives: Cody Walker (uncle)

Meadow Rain Walker (born November 4, 1998) is an American model. She is the daughter of actor Paul Walker, who died in 2013.

== Early life ==
Walker was born on November 4, 1998, the daughter of actor Paul Walker and Rebecca Soteros. She is of Greek and Swedish descent through her mother. She grew up in Hawaii and, in 2011, moved to live with her father in California aged 13. Her father died in 2013, after which there was a custody battle. Her parents kept her out of the spotlight, and she did not seek publicity until she started her modeling career. She kept her father's collection of crystals.

== Career ==
Walker first signed with DNA Models in 2017. She has worked with Proenza Schouler and did a tie-in with Givenchy, opening Givenchy's Fall-Winter ready-to-wear show in March 2021, then wearing Givenchy at her wedding later that year. At the Schouler shows, she has worked alongside Ella Emhoff.

In 2023, she made her acting debut in the form of a cameo appearance as an unnamed flight attendant in Fast X, the tenth installment of the Fast & Furious film series that her father was best known for. Her late father also appeared in the film via archival footage from Fast Five.

== Personal life ==
Walker has an interest in yoga, acupuncture and holistic medicine. She continues her father's charitable work through the conservation organization The Paul Walker Foundation, which she founded in 2015. The organization offers grants to marine biology students. She has also worked with Soma Sara, who runs the anti-rape movement Everyone's Invited.

In August 2021, Walker announced her engagement to actor Louis Thornton-Allan. Meadow married Thornton-Allan in the Dominican Republic in October 2021, following the two-month engagement. The wedding was highly publicized, including an interview with Vogue. She was given away by her father's Fast & Furious co-star Vin Diesel, who is her godfather.

In June 2022, she revealed that she had an abortion in 2020. In December 2023, she announced her separation from Louis Thornton-Allan. Meadow filed for divorce on February 15, 2024, and requested that Thornton-Allan not receive spousal support. Their divorce was finalized in June 2024.

== Filmography ==
=== Film ===
Year	Title	Role	Notes
2023	Fast X	Flight attendant	Cameo
2026	The Crack of Dawn	Self	Short
