= Cody Walker (actor) =

American actor

- Born: Cody Beau Walker; Los Angeles, California, U.S.
- Education: University of California, Santa Barbara
- Occupation: Actor
- Years active: 2013–present
- Spouse: Felicia Knox (m. 2015)
- Children: 3
- Relatives: Paul Walker (brother); Meadow Walker (niece)

Cody Beau Walker is an American actor. He is the youngest brother of the late actor Paul Walker; and helped complete the final scenes for Paul's character, Brian O'Conner, in the film Furious 7 (2015) following his brother's death. He went on to appear in films USS Indianapolis: Men of Courage (2016) and The Last Full Measure (2020).

== Early life ==
His mother, Cheryl (née Crabtree), was a fashion model, and his father, Paul William Walker III, was a sewer contractor and former amateur boxer, who was a two-time Golden Gloves champion. Walker's paternal grandfather, William, had a short-lived boxing career as "Irish" Billy Walker, while another raced factory cars for Ford in the 1960s. Walker grew up with four siblings: Aimee, Ashlie, Caleb, and actor Paul.

Walker graduated from La Cañada High School in 2006 and subsequently earned a Bachelor's Degree in Cultural Anthropology from the University of California, Santa Barbara. He is a licensed paramedic after completing Emergency Medical Technician (EMT) certification from University of California, Los Angeles, Center for Prehospital Care. Walker moved to Coos County, Oregon, and worked as a paramedic in an ambulance for nearly three years.

== Career ==
Walker made his debut in the action film Furious 7 (2015) after his older brother Paul Walker died on November 30, 2013, in a single-vehicle accident. Cody and Caleb Walker both stepped in to help finish their brother's scenes as Brian O'Conner in the movie, which was still filming at the time of Paul's death. Furious 7 premiered in Los Angeles on April 1, 2015, and was theatrically released in the United States on April 3, exactly six years after the fourth film was released. Upon release, the film became a critical and financial success, and it grossed $397.6 million worldwide during its opening weekend, which was the highest of all-time at the time. The film grossed over $1.5 billion worldwide, making it the third highest-grossing film of 2015 and the fourth highest-grossing film of all time at the time of release. After his appearance in Furious 7, Walker decided to pursue acting, and signed with Paradigm Talent Agency in 2015.

There were some reports that he would be in The Fate of the Furious (2017) as a new role, or replace his older brother in the role of Brian O'Conner; however, it was later announced that the character would not return to the franchise.

In 2018, Walker and his brother Caleb have stated that they would be open to reprising their roles as stand-ins for their late brother Paul's character, Brian O'Conner, in a future Fast & Furious film, provided it was done respectfully and tastefully. In 2026, Walker stated that he would not reprise his role as a stand-in for Brian O'Conner in the final installment, Fast Forever (2028), and expressed that any decision regarding the use of his late brother's likeness should involve Paul's daughter, Meadow Walker.

He portrayed Petty Officer Third class James West in the World War II film USS Indianapolis: Men of Courage (2016) alongside Nicolas Cage and Matt Lanter. The film is based largely on the true story of the loss of the ship of the same name in the closing stages of the Second World War. He appeared in the documentary film I Am Paul Walker (2018) that aired on Paramount Network. Walker played Eric Shaw in the action-adventure film Shadow Wolves (2019), which was originally planned to be a television series. He appeared in the war drama film The Last Full Measure (2020) as Young Kepper. Beginning in the fall of 2023, Walker and his wife Felicia will be the new hosts of a renovation series known as Fast: Home Rescue for broadcast syndication to be produced by Byron Allen's company Futureman Media Group.

== Philanthropy ==
Walker is the chief executive officer for his brother Paul's charity foundation, Reach Out Worldwide, that helps bring first responders to disaster areas to augment local relief efforts. In November 2020, Reach Out Worldwide donated 120 cases of hand sanitizer to North Bend Fire Department during COVID-19 pandemic. Walker is the co-founder of car show FuelFest, which returned for the fourth time in June 2022. The car show benefits Reach Out Worldwide.

== Personal life ==
Walker married his girlfriend of seven years, Felicia Knox, on August 15, 2015, in Gold Beach, Oregon. The couple have three children together.

== Filmography ==
=== Film ===
Year	Title	Role	Notes
2015	Furious 7	Brian O'Conner	Finished scenes for Paul Walker after his brother's death
2016	USS Indianapolis: Men of Courage	Petty Officer Third class James West	
2018	In Memory of Paul: Car Show 2018	Himself	Short film
2019	Shadow Wolves	Eric Shaw	
2019	The Last Full Measure	Young Kepper	

=== Television ===
Year	Title	Role	Notes
2016	In the Rough	Blake McCracken	5 episodes
2018	I Am Paul Walker	Himself	Documentary
2022–present	Fast: Home Rescue	Himself (Host)	The Weather Channel

=== Music videos ===
Year	Title	Artist	Role
2019	"The Difference (Goshdamn)"	Caroline Jones	Lead talent
2019	"Chasing Me"	Caroline Jones	Lead talent
