= Fast & Furious =

Universal Pictures media franchise

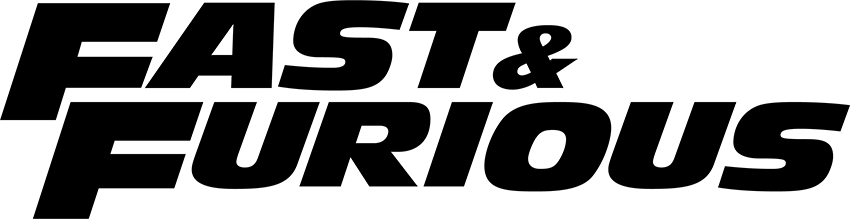
- Official franchise logo
- Created by: Gary Scott Thompson
- Original work: The Fast and the Furious (2001)
- Owner: Universal Pictures
- Years: 2001–present
- Based on: "Racer X" by Kenneth Li

Films and television
- Animated series: Fast & Furious Spy Racers (2019–2021)

Games
- Traditional: Fast & Furious: Highway Heist

Miscellaneous
- Theme park attractions: The Fast and the Furious: Extreme Close-Up (2006–2013); Fast & Furious: Supercharged (2015–2026); Fast & Furious: Hollywood Drift (2026–present)

Official website
- Official website

Fast & Furious (formerly known as The Fast and the Furious) is an American action media franchise centered on a series of films revolving around street racing, heists, and spies. The franchise also includes short films, a television series, toys, video games, live shows, theme park and museum attractions. The films are distributed by Universal Pictures.

The first film, based on the 1998 Vibe magazine article "Racer X" by Ken Li and written by Gary Scott Thompson, Erik Bergquist, and David Ayer, was released in 2001. The first four films focused on illegal street racing, culminating in Fast & Furious (2009). The series moved towards heists and espionage with Fast Five (2011), which was followed by five further films in that genre. An eleventh and final film, Fast Forever, is set to be released in 2028.

Universal expanded the franchise with the short films The Turbo Charged Prelude for 2 Fast 2 Furious (2003) and Los Bandoleros (2009) and the spin-off film Hobbs & Shaw (2019), while its subsidiary DreamWorks Animation followed this with the six-season animated streaming television series Fast & Furious Spy Racers (2019–2021). Soundtrack albums have been released for all the films, as well as compilation albums containing existing music heard in the films.

The series has been commercially successful. It is Universal's biggest franchise and the eighth highest-grossing film series, with a combined gross of over $7 billion. Critical reception of the franchise has been mixed, though the fifth through ninth entries have been more positively received.

== Films ==
Fast & Furious films
Film	U.S. release date	Directed by	Screenplay by	Produced by
The Fast and the Furious	June 22, 2001	Rob Cohen	David Ayer, Erik Bergquist & Gary Scott Thompson; Story: Gary Scott Thompson; Based on: "Racer X" by Ken Li	Neal H. Moritz
2 Fast 2 Furious	June 6, 2003	John Singleton	Derek Haas & Michael Brandt; Story: Haas, Brandt & Thompson	Neal H. Moritz
The Fast and the Furious: Tokyo Drift	June 16, 2006	Justin Lin	Chris Morgan	Neal H. Moritz
Fast & Furious	April 3, 2009	Justin Lin	Chris Morgan	Vin Diesel, Moritz & Michael Fottrell
Fast Five	April 29, 2011	Justin Lin	Chris Morgan	Vin Diesel, Moritz & Michael Fottrell
Fast & Furious 6	May 24, 2013	Justin Lin	Chris Morgan	Diesel, Moritz & Clayton Townsend
Furious 7	April 3, 2015	James Wan	Chris Morgan	Diesel, Moritz & Fottrell
The Fate of the Furious	April 14, 2017	F. Gary Gray	Chris Morgan	Diesel, Morgan, Moritz & Fottrell
F9	June 25, 2021	Justin Lin	Lin & Daniel Casey; Story: Lin, Casey & Alfredo Botello	Joe Roth, Diesel, Lin, Neal H. Moritz, Townsend, Samantha Vincent & Jeff Kirschenbaum
Fast X	May 19, 2023	Louis Leterrier	Dan Mazeau & Lin; Story: Zach Dean, Mazeau & Lin	Diesel, Lin, Moritz, Vincent & Kirschenbaum
Fast Forever	March 17, 2028	Louis Leterrier	Michael Lesslie	Moritz, Diesel, Johnson, Kirschenbaum, Roth, Vincent

=== The Fast and the Furious (2001) ===
Brian O'Conner, an LAPD officer, goes undercover in the street racing world to investigate a group of unknown truck hijackers, believed to be led by Dominic Toretto, a professional street racer.

=== 2 Fast 2 Furious (2003) ===
Brian O'Conner, who is now living in Miami, teams up with Roman Pearce, his estranged childhood friend, to go undercover for the U.S. Customs Service to bring down drug lord Carter Verone in exchange for the erasure of their criminal records.

This is the only film in the main series without Vin Diesel as Dominic Toretto.

=== The Fast and the Furious: Tokyo Drift (2006) ===
High school car enthusiast Sean Boswell is sent to live in Tokyo with his father in order to avoid time in prison and finds solace in the city's drifting community.

Vin Diesel makes a cameo appearance as Dominic Toretto at the end of the film.

=== Fast & Furious (2009) ===
Dominic Toretto and Federal Bureau of Investigation (FBI) agent Brian O'Conner are forced to work together to avenge the murder of Toretto's lover Letty Ortiz and apprehend drug lord Arturo Braga.

The film is set five years after the events of The Fast and the Furious, and before Tokyo Drift, with Sung Kang reprising his role as Han Lue from the latter film.

=== Fast Five (2011) ===
Dom and Brian, along with Dom's sister Mia plan a heist to steal $100 million from corrupt businessman Hernan Reyes while being pursued for arrest by U.S. Diplomatic Security Service (DSS) agent Luke Hobbs.

The film is also set before the events of Tokyo Drift. Despite not appearing in the film, a picture of Michelle Rodriguez as Letty Ortiz is seen in the mid-credits scene, where Eva Mendes reprises her role as Monica Fuentes from 2 Fast 2 Furious.

=== Fast & Furious 6 (2013) ===
Dominic Toretto, Brian O'Conner and their team are offered amnesty for their crimes by Luke Hobbs, in exchange for helping him take down a skilled mercenary organization led by Owen Shaw, one member of which is Toretto's former lover Letty Ortiz.

The film is the final film to be set before the events of Tokyo Drift. Jason Statham appears as Owen's older brother Deckard Shaw in the credits scene, seemingly killing Han, as seen in Tokyo Drift.

=== Furious 7 (2015) ===
Dominic Toretto, Brian O'Conner, and their team are recruited by covert ops leader Mr. Nobody to prevent terrorist Mose Jakande from obtaining a hacking program known as God's Eye.

The film is set after the events of Fast & Furious 6 and continues from the ending of Tokyo Drift, with Lucas Black reprising his role as Sean Boswell. It also marks the final appearance of Paul Walker as Brian O'Conner, due to his death in 2013.

=== The Fate of the Furious (2017) ===
Cyberterrorist Cipher coerces Dominic Toretto into working for her and turns him against his team, forcing them to take down Cipher and reunite with him.

This is the first film since Tokyo Drift not to feature Paul Walker as Brian O'Conner and Jordana Brewster as Mia Toretto.

=== F9 (2021) ===
Dominic Toretto and his family must stop a world-shattering plot headed by Cipher and Dominic's estranged younger brother Jakob, played by John Cena.

The film is set two years after the events of The Fate of the Furious. This is the first film since Fast & Furious not to feature Dwayne Johnson as Luke Hobbs. Jason Statham appears as Deckard Shaw in the mid-credits scene, while Jordana Brewster returns to the franchise in her role of Mia Toretto, along with Sung Kang as Han Lue, who is revealed to be alive, and Lucas Black as Sean Boswell. Shad Moss and Jason Tobin reprise their roles as Twinkie and Earl, respectively, from Tokyo Drift.

=== Fast X (2023) ===
Dominic Toretto must protect his family from Dante Reyes, who pursues revenge for his father's death and the loss of their fortune.

The film is set two years after the events of F9 and ten years after Fast Five. Dwayne Johnson returns to the main franchise as Luke Hobbs in the mid-credits scene, while Gal Gadot reprises her role as Gisele Yashar, who is revealed to have survived the events of Fast & Furious 6, in the ending scene.

== Spin-off ==
Film	U.S. release date	Director(s)	Screenwriter(s)	Producer(s)
Hobbs & Shaw	August 2, 2019	David Leitch	Drew Pearce & Morgan; Story: Morgan	Morgan, Hiram Garcia, Jason Statham & Dwayne Johnson

=== Hobbs & Shaw (2019) ===
Luke Hobbs and Deckard Shaw team up with Deckard's sister Hattie to battle cybernetically enhanced terrorist Brixton Lore threatening the world with a deadly virus.

== Future ==
- Fast Forever: On April 19, 2023, Louis Leterrier was announced as the director of an untitled sequel to Fast X and Hobbs & Reyes, while Christina Hodson and Oren Uziel were announced as screenwriters five days later. Later that month at CinemaCon, Vin Diesel revealed the eleventh film would be released in 2025. The project was put on hold due to the 2023 Writers Guild of America and SAG-AFTRA strikes. While Fast X led the development of the eleventh film, its budget and modest box office performance meant that the project's continuation would serve as a finale. It was reported that an eleventh film could be "a throwback to the original film", and consist of a single mission and a different antagonist instead of Dante. In February 2024, Diesel confirmed that the eleventh film would be the final installment. In May 2024, Leterrier announced that the film was delayed to 2026. The next month, it was announced that Zach Dean replaced Hodson and Uziel as the writer. In November 2024, it was announced that the film would be released in March 2026. In June 2025, Diesel announced the film would now release in April 2027, claiming the film would go back to the roots of the franchise, while also saying that Brian O'Conner was due to return. On October 3, 2025, a report from The Wall Street Journal said that a spokesperson for Universal confirmed that the film had no release date and was facing potential cancelation due to Universal unwilling to greenlight it if the budget goes over $200 million. The studio also wished to either cut screentime from members of the cast, or remove them entirely from the film. In January 2026, it was announced that the film is officially titled Fast Forever, and was scheduled to be released on March 17, 2028. In March 2026, Michael Lesslie was announced as the new screenwriter replacing Zach Dean. In August 2026, Diesel claimed Lesslie's script was "the best script I have read in decades." Later that month, Diesel revealed that filming would begin that December. Leterrier later conflicted this statement by claiming he had not read a final script, despite remaining attached as director.
- Hobbs & Reyes: In November 2019, producer Hiram Garcia confirmed that all creatives involved have intentions in developing a sequel to Hobbs & Shaw, with conversations regarding the project ongoing. By March 2020, Dwayne Johnson confirmed that a sequel was officially in development, while the creative team was not yet decided. Garcia confirmed the project was in active development a month later, citing the box office performance of Hobbs & Shaw, and announced Chris Morgan would return to write. Johnson expressed excitement for the sequel that same month, stating that it will introduce new characters. In November 2021, Johnson revealed that he had developed an original idea for the sequel, which he described as "the antithesis of Fast & Furious" and that he presented the concept to Universal Pictures chairwoman Donna Langley, as well as Garcia and Morgan. He elaborated the sequel would take immediate precedence over the rest of his film-slate, and further teased its development would progress after he completed the holiday-action film Red One (2024). Later that month, Garcia confirmed that work on the screenplay is ongoing, calling the film "very ambitious". In December 2022, Universal Pictures producer Kelly McCormick stated the film's production has been stalled. In June 2023, Johnson announced plans for a direct Hobbs & Shaw sequel were postponed, and that a standalone sequel serving as a direct continuation to Fast X (2023) that would bridge into the eleventh main film was in development. The film's title, Hobbs & Reyes, was then announced, with Johnson and Jason Momoa set to star. Morgan was set to return to write the film, with Garcia, Johnson, Dany Garcia, Vin Diesel, Samantha Vincent, Jeff Kirschenbaum, and Neal H. Moritz set to produce.
- Untitled stand-alone film: In 2024, Zach Dean (the writer of Fast X) was hired to write an untitled stand-alone film.
- Untitled female-led spin-off: In 2015, Diesel said major spin-offs were in development. A female spin-off was confirmed in 2019 with Nicole Perlman, Lindsey Anderson Beer, and Geneva Robertson-Dworet as screenwriters.

== Short films ==
Film	U.S. release date	Director(s)	Screenwriter(s)	Story by	Producer(s)	Running time
The Turbo Charged Prelude for 2 Fast 2 Furious	June 3, 2003	Philip G. Atwell	Keith Dinielli	Keith Dinielli	Chris Palladino	6 mins
Los Bandoleros	July 28, 2009	Vin Diesel	T.J. Mancini	Vin Diesel & T.J. Mancini	Vin Diesel, Jessy Terrero & Samantha Vincent	20 mins

The short films were either released direct-to-video or saw limited theatrical distribution, being mostly included as special features for The Fast and the Furious, 2 Fast 2 Furious, and Fast & Furious, as part of the DVD releases. The films, which range from 10 to 20 minutes, are designed to be self-contained stories that provide backstory for characters or events introduced in the films. They were also designed to bridge the chronological gap that was created when the initial lead characters departed the series.

In March 2025, Diesel announced that he would return as director for a short which will take place chronologically before the final film.

=== The Turbo Charged Prelude for 2 Fast 2 Furious (2003) ===
Following the events of The Fast and the Furious, Brian O'Conner escapes from Los Angeles to avoid law enforcement until his eventual arrival in Miami in 2 Fast 2 Furious.

=== Los Bandoleros (2009) ===
Set between the events of The Fast and the Furious and Fast & Furious, Dominic Toretto lives as a wanted fugitive in the Dominican Republic. He eventually reunites with Letty and other associates to plan the hijacking of a gasoline shipment to help an impoverished neighborhood.

== Television ==
Series	Season	Episodes	Originally released	Network	Showrunner(s)	Executive Producer(s)
Fast & Furious Spy Racers	1	8	December 26, 2019	Netflix	Tim Hedrick & Bret Haaland	Vin Diesel, Tim Hedrick, Bret Haaland, Chris Morgan & Neal H. Moritz
Fast & Furious Spy Racers	2	8	October 9, 2020	Netflix	Tim Hedrick & Bret Haaland	Vin Diesel, Tim Hedrick, Bret Haaland, Chris Morgan & Neal H. Moritz
Fast & Furious Spy Racers	3	8	December 26, 2020	Netflix	Tim Hedrick & Bret Haaland	Vin Diesel, Tim Hedrick, Bret Haaland, Chris Morgan & Neal H. Moritz
Fast & Furious Spy Racers	4	8	April 16, 2021	Netflix	Tim Hedrick & Bret Haaland	Vin Diesel, Tim Hedrick, Bret Haaland, Chris Morgan & Neal H. Moritz
Fast & Furious Spy Racers	5	8	August 13, 2021	Netflix	Tim Hedrick & Bret Haaland	Vin Diesel, Tim Hedrick, Bret Haaland, Chris Morgan & Neal H. Moritz
Fast & Furious Spy Racers	6	12	December 17, 2021	Netflix	Tim Hedrick & Bret Haaland	Vin Diesel, Tim Hedrick, Bret Haaland, Chris Morgan & Neal H. Moritz

=== Fast & Furious Spy Racers (2019–2021) ===
Tony Toretto (voiced by Tyler Posey), Dominic Toretto's cousin, is recruited by a government agency together with his friends to infiltrate an elite racing league serving as a front for a crime organization called SH1FT3R that is bent on world domination.

Fast & Furious Spy Racers is an animated series produced by DreamWorks Animation Television, based on the film franchise. Vin Diesel reprises his role as Dominic Toretto, voicing the character in brief appearances. It is executive produced by Tim Hedrick, Bret Haaland, Diesel, Neal H. Moritz and Chris Morgan. Hedrick and Haaland also serve as the show's showrunners. The series' first season was released on Netflix on December 26, 2019, and its second season on October 9, 2020. Its third season was released on December 26, the fourth season on April 16, 2021. The fifth was released on August 13, and the sixth and final season premiered on December 17, 2021.

=== Untitled Peacock series ===
In May 2026, Diesel announced that four live-action Fast & Furious television series were in various stages of development for Peacock. Mike Daniels and Wolfe Coleman are set to be the showrunners for the first planned series, while Nick Wootton and Charmaine DeGraté, Ingrid Escajeda, and Joe Henderson were hired by Universal to write pilot episodes for the three other series. In October 2026, it was announced that the first series had officially been greenlit, with a set premiere date of 2028.

== Cast and crew ==
=== Principal cast ===
List indicator

This section includes characters who will appear or have appeared in multiple Fast & Furious films and related media.

- An empty grey cell indicates the character was not in the media, or that the character's official presence has not yet been confirmed.

Main cast of the Fast & Furious films
Character	Main films	Short films	Television series	Spin-off films
Dominic "Dom" Toretto	Vin Diesel	Vin Diesel	Vin Diesel	
Brian O'Conner	Paul Walker (Note: After Paul Walker's death in a single vehicle accident on November 30, 2013, halfway through filming Furious 7, his brothers, Caleb and Cody, and John Brotherton (who also appears in the film as Sheppard), were hired as stand-ins to film his remaining scenes, with Paul's face, recreated by CGI or archive footage, placed over theirs.)	Paul Walker		
Han Lue	Sung Kang	Sung Kang		
Letty Ortiz	Michelle Rodriguez	Michelle Rodriguez		
Luke Hobbs	Dwayne Johnson			Dwayne Johnson
Deckard Shaw	Jason Statham			Jason Statham
Queenie Shaw	Helen Mirren			Helen Mirren
Roman Pearce	Tyrese Gibson			
Tej Parker	Chris "Ludacris" Bridges			
Jakob Toretto	John Cena			
Mia Toretto	Jordana Brewster			
Ramsey	Nathalie Emmanuel			
Mr. Nobody	Kurt Russell			
Cipher	Charlize Theron			
Vince	Matt Schulze			
Tego Leo	Tego Calderón	Tego Calderón		
Rico Santos	Don Omar	Don Omar		
Elena Neves	Elsa Pataky			
Gisele Yashar	Gal Gadot			
Sean Boswell	Lucas Black			

== Additional crew and production details ==
Film/Television	Crew/detail					
Film/Television	Composer(s)	Cinematographer(s)	Editor(s)	Production companies	Distributing company	Running time
The Fast and the Furious	BT	Ericson Core	Peter Honess; Dallas Puett	Neal H. Moritz Productions; Mediastream Film GmbH & Co. Productions KG	Universal Pictures	106
2 Fast 2 Furious	David Arnold	Matthew F. Leonetti	Bruce Cannon; Dallas Puett	Neal H. Moritz Productions; Mikona Productions GmbH & Co. KG	Universal Pictures	108
The Fast and the Furious: Tokyo Drift	Brian Tyler	Stephen F. Windon	Fred Raskin; Thomas Douglas; Dallas Puett; Kelly Matsumoto	Original Film; Relativity Media; MP Munich Pape Filmproduction	Universal Pictures	104
Fast & Furious	Brian Tyler	Amir Mokri	Fred Raskin; Thomas Douglas; Christian Wagner	Original Film; One Race Films; Relativity Media	Universal Pictures	107
Fast Five	Brian Tyler	Stephen F. Windon	Fred Raskin; Kelly Matsumoto; Thomas Douglas; Christian Wagner	Original Film; One Race Films Relativity Media	Universal Pictures	130
Fast & Furious 6	Lucas Vidal	Stephen F. Windon	Greg D'Auria; Dylan Highsmith; Kelly Matsumoto; Thomas Douglas; Christian Wagner; Leigh Folsom Boyd	Original Film; One Race Films; Relativity Media	Universal Pictures	130
Furious 7	Brian Tyler	Marc Spicer; Stephen F. Windon	Kirk Morri; Dylan Highsmith; Thomas Douglas; Christian Wagner; Leigh Folsom Boyd	MRC; China Film; Original Film; One Race Films	Universal Pictures	137
The Fate of the Furious	Brian Tyler	Stephen F. Windon	Paul Rubell; Christian Wagner	China Film; Original Film; One Race Films	Universal Pictures	136
Hobbs & Shaw	Tyler Bates	Jonathan Sela	Christopher Rouse	Seven Bucks Productions; Chris Morgan Productions	Universal Pictures	137
Fast & Furious Spy Racers	Ryan Lofty; Jay Vincent	—N/a	—N/a	Universal Pictures; DreamWorks Animation Television	Netflix; NBCUniversal Syndication Studios	23–24
F9	Brian Tyler	Stephen F. Windon	Greg D'Auria; Dylan Highsmith; Kelly Matsumoto	Original Film; One Race Films; Roth/Kirschenbaum Films; Perfect Storm Entertainment	Universal Pictures	143
Fast X	Brian Tyler	Stephen F. Windon	Corbin Mehl; Laura Yanovich; Dylan Highsmith; Kelly Matsumoto	Original Film; One Race Films; Roth/Kirschenbaum Films; Perfect Storm Entertainment	Universal Pictures	141

== Production ==
=== Development ===
==== Main films ====
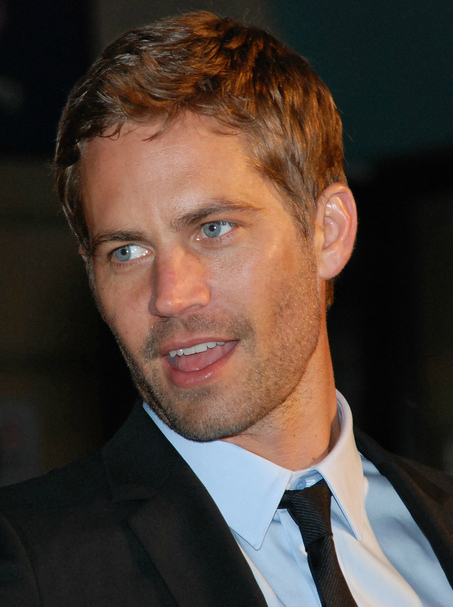
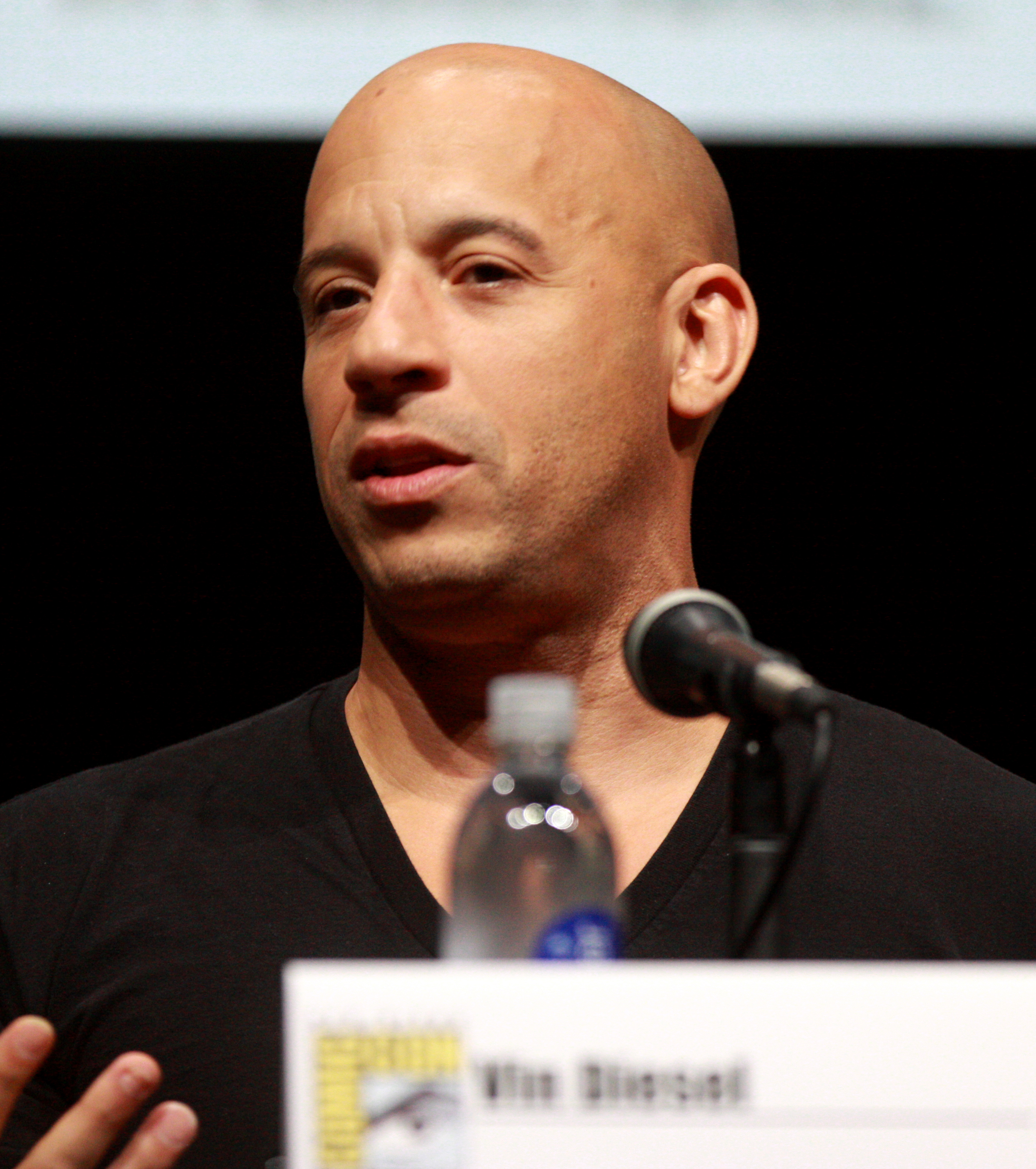
The series helped further the careers of Paul Walker (top) and Vin Diesel (bottom).

In 2000, actor Paul Walker had worked with director Rob Cohen on The Skulls. Cohen secured a deal with producer Neal H. Moritz for an untitled action film for Universal Pictures, and approached Walker and asked him to suggest his "dream" action film; Walker suggested a mash-up of the films Days of Thunder (1990) and Donnie Brasco (1997). Soon thereafter, Cohen and Moritz brought him the Vibe magazine article "Racer X" by Ken Li, published in May 1998, which detailed underground street racing operating in New York City, and suggested a story set to follow Walker as an undercover cop tasked with infiltrating the world of underground street racing in Los Angeles inspired by the article. Upon hearing this, Walker signed on immediately; finding his co-star proved difficult. The studio warmed toward the idea of Timothy Olyphant in the role of Dominic Toretto, due to the success of the blockbuster Gone in 60 Seconds (2000), but he declined. Moritz persisted on Vin Diesel following his performance in Pitch Black (2000), with Diesel accepting after proposing several script changes. Moritz had difficulty choosing between the titles Racer X (after the article), Redline, Race Wars and Street Wars, but was ultimately inspired by a documentary on American International Pictures, which included the 1954 film The Fast and the Furious. Moritz was traded use of some stock footage to its director, Roger Corman, in exchange for a license to use the title. Upon release in June 2001, the film shattered box office expectations and a sequel was green-lit.

Diesel declined to return for the sequel, saying that the screenplay was inferior to its predecessor. Cohen also declined the sequel, opting to develop the film XXX (2002), which starred Diesel in the lead role. To account for these changes, Universal commissioned the writers to create a standalone sequel with Walker in the lead and brought in John Singleton as the new director. Filming was delayed by a year and the production location shifted to Miami. Tyrese Gibson, who worked with Singleton on the film Baby Boy (2001), was hired as Walker's new co-star for what was also the first entry in the series to feature long-running cast member Ludacris.

Universal attempted to bring back Diesel for the third installment, but he again declined due to other projects and a dislike for the script. After failing to secure the returns of Walker or any other member of the original cast, Universal ordered a stand-alone film of the franchise. Screenwriter Chris Morgan subsequently attempted to revive the series primarily for car enthusiasts, introducing new characters, focusing on a car-related subculture and moving the series to Tokyo; Japan contains one of the world's largest automotive industries. It is the first film in the series to start its tradition of filming in locations outside the United States. Impressed by his work on Better Luck Tomorrow (2002), which shared similar elements with Tokyo Drift, Moritz hired director Justin Lin. The third film marked the first appearance in the Fast & Furious franchise of Han Lue, portrayed by Sung Kang, a character who originated from Lin's Better Luck Tomorrow. Although the relation between Better Luck Tomorrow and Fast & Furious was originally left unaddressed, both Lin and Kang repeatedly confirmed during the following years that it was the same character, and that Better Luck Tomorrow doubled as Han's origin story, retroactively making the film part of the Fast & Furious continuity. Moreover, with Tokyo Drift, the series was able to bring Diesel in for a cameo appearance, in exchange for letting the actor's production company acquire the rights to the Riddick character. The third film was the least financially successful of the franchise, received lukewarm reception and left the future of the franchise in limbo.

Away from the franchise, Diesel made a string of box office or critical flops, including The Chronicles of Riddick (2004), The Pacifier (2005) and Find Me Guilty (2006), but his cameo in Tokyo Drift generated interest in reviving the series. After signing Diesel and confirming the return of Lin, Universal worked to track the first film's original co-stars and re-signed Walker, Michelle Rodriguez and Jordana Brewster in mid-2008. Walker was initially reluctant to rejoin the franchise after six years, but Diesel assured him that film would be considered the first "true" sequel. Morgan returned to write after the critical praise for the character Han Lue. Given the apparent death of the character in the third film, the timeline of the franchise was altered to account for his appearance. With the emphasis on car culture toned down, the fourth film, Fast & Furious, was a commercial success. Although critical reception was mixed, it reinvigorated the franchise, as well as the star power of Diesel and Walker.

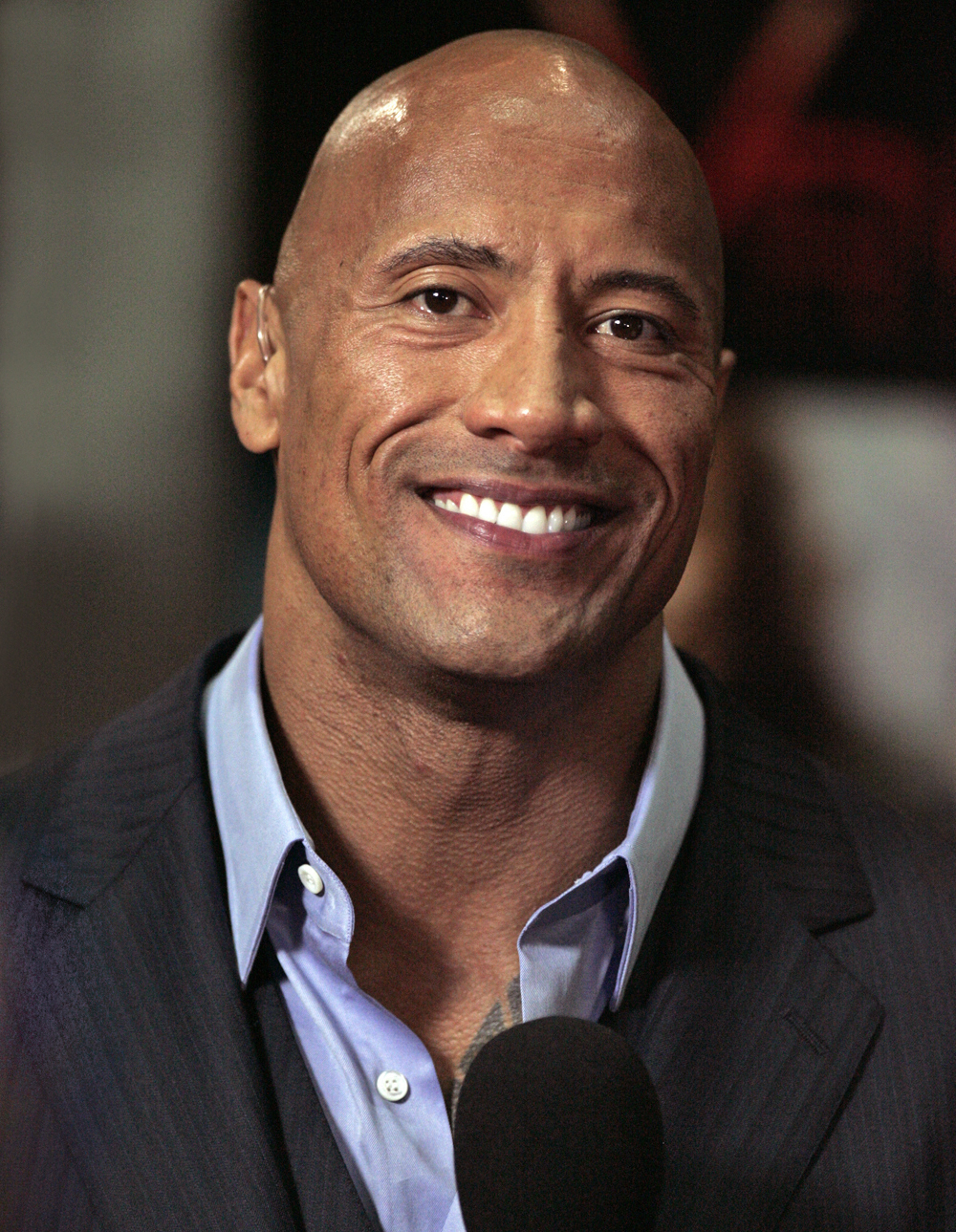
Dwayne Johnson joined the cast in Fast Five and headlined the first spin-off film.

In 2011, Fast Five was released. While developing the film, Universal completely departed from any street racing elements prevalent in previous films, to transform the franchise into a heist action series involving cars. By doing so, they hoped to attract wider audiences that might otherwise be put off by a heavy emphasis on cars and car culture. Fast Five is considered the transitional film in the series, featuring only one car race and giving more attention to action set pieces such as gun fights, brawls and the heist. Fast Five was initially conceived to conclude the franchise, but following positive reception at test screenings, alongside its eventual strong critical and commercial performance, Universal proceeded to develop a sixth film. Furthermore, the film is noted for the addition of Dwayne Johnson to the cast, whose performance was critically praised.

In late 2011, the Los Angeles Times reported that Universal was approaching the sixth and seventh installment with a single storyline running through both films, with Morgan envisaging themes of freedom and family, but later shifted to account for the studio's wishes to incorporate elements of espionage. Lin revealed that he had, after discussions with Diesel, storyboarded, previsualized and began editing a twelve-minute finale for Fast & Furious 6, before filming was completed on Fast Five. Upon release, the sixth film became the highest-grossing film in the series, grossing $788 million worldwide.

Universal lacked a major event film for 2014 and rushed the seventh film into pre-production in mid-2013 due to its status as a bankable asset. Lin decided not to return to direct the seventh film, as he was still performing post-production on Fast & Furious 6. James Wan, primarily known for horror films, took over directorial duties. In November 2013, Walker died in a car crash, and the seventh film was delayed to 2015 that December. His brothers Caleb and Cody were hired as stand-ins to recreate Walker's likeness using CGI, reworking his character arc as "retired". Furious 7 (2015) was released to critical and commercial success as the third-highest-grossing film of 2015. Universal unveiled plans for three sequels to Furious 7 in November 2014.

The toll of multiple re-shoots dissuaded Wan from returning to the franchise and Universal hired F. Gary Gray to helm the eighth film, The Fate of the Furious. This film was to begin a new trilogy to conclude the franchise. The film was released in 2017 and received mixed reviews from critics, many of whom praised the performances and action sequences, but criticized the storyline and the long running time. It was an unabashed commercial success, grossing over $1.2 billion worldwide. Universal later announced that final two films will be released in May 2020 and April 2021, with Lin returning to direct. It was announced that Brewster would reprise her role as Mia Toretto, while screenwriter Daniel Casey was hired for the ninth film; F9 is the first film since Tokyo Drift not to be written by Morgan. Pre-production began in February 2019 in London, and filming began in June and concluded in November. John Cena was cast as the film's villain, portraying Jakob Toretto, Dom's brother. Moreover, Sung Kang returned as Han, while the film is the first to star Helen Mirren and saw Lucas Black reprise his role as Sean Boswell from Tokyo Drift. F9 was originally scheduled to be theatrically released on May 22, 2020, but was pushed back a year to April 2, 2021, due to the COVID-19 pandemic. It was then pushed back to May 28, 2021, and finally released in the United States on June 25. It broke pandemic box office records, grossing $726 million worldwide.

Fast X was designed to be the final movie of the franchise which later evolved in becoming a two part finale. Justin Lin was brought back to direct both movies but left the process early on due to on set differences with Vin Diesel. Louis Leterrier was then hired as his replacement to direct the two part finale. At Universal's request, the two part finale was changed to a trilogy. However, Fast X under performed at the box-office and given its massive budget of nearly $400 million USD, Universal now opted for a standalone sequel which will serve as a finale to the entire franchise and if it can be produced for $200 million USD. This led to protracted negotiations but a sequel to Fast X, Fast Forever was announced on January 30th 2026 after three years of postponement, with a expected release date of March 17th 2028. Paul Walker's character, Brian O'Conner, will return, and the film will end the franchise after 27 years.

==== Spin-off films ====
In 2015, Diesel announced that potential spin-offs were in the early stages of development. In 2019, Diesel announced a film that will focus on the female characters from the Fast & Furious and mentioned that there are three spin-off films in development. Nicole Perlman, Lindsey Anderson Beer and Geneva Robertson-Dworet will serve as co-screenwriters on the project.

The first spin-off, Fast & Furious Presents: Hobbs & Shaw, was announced in 2018 and starred Johnson and Jason Statham. In late 2017, Variety reported Morgan had written the script, while David Leitch would direct. Originally, the ninth film in the main series was supposed to be released in April 2019, followed by the tenth in April 2021. Instead, Universal opted to proceed with the spin-off, to occupy the 2019 release date. This caused tensions between Johnson, Diesel and Gibson, with Gibson responding through an Instagram post, criticizing Johnson for causing the ninth film to be delayed. Johnson called out his male co-stars after completing The Fate of the Furious in a now deleted Instagram post saying, "My male co-stars however are a different story. Some conduct themselves as stand up men and true professionals, while others don't. The ones that don't are too chicken shit to do anything about it anyway. Candy asses. When you watch this movie next April and it seems like I'm not acting in some of these scenes and my blood is legit boiling—you're right." Johnson later cited scheduling issues as his refusal to participate in F9 and later confirmed he will not be in the final two Fast & Furious films (Fast X and its sequel), despite Vin Diesel asking him to return in an Instagram post, with Johnson calling Diesel's attempt "manipulative". However, Johnson made a cameo appearance at the end of Fast X which indicated his potential involvement in its sequel.

In October 2018, long-term producer Neal H. Moritz filed a lawsuit against Universal Pictures for breach of oral contract and committing promissory fraud, after the distributor removed him as lead producer for Hobbs & Shaw. Furthermore, it was revealed in May 2019 that Universal had dropped Moritz from all future Fast & Furious installments. His lawsuit was settled in September 2020, and Moritz would later return to the series with F9.

=== Television series ===
In April 2016, DreamWorks Animation was acquired by NBCUniversal for $3.8 billion, with the acquisition including a first look deal with the company to produce animated projects based on or with films under the Universal Pictures banner. In April 2018, streaming service Netflix green-lit the series Fast & Furious Spy Racers, with Bret Haaland, Neal H. Mortiz, Vin Diesel, Tim Hedrick and Chris Morgan as executive producers and Hedrick and Haaland as showrunners. The series premiered on December 26, 2019, and ran for six seasons.

== Reception ==
Box office performance of Fast & Furious films
Film	U.S. release date	Budget	Box office gross				Ref.
Film	U.S. release date	Budget	Opening weekend (Domestic)	U.S. and Canada	International	Worldwide	Ref.
The Fast and the Furious	June 22, 2001	$38 million	$40,089,015	$144,745,925	$62,771,584	$207,517,509	
2 Fast 2 Furious	June 6, 2003	$76 million	$50,472,480	$127,154,901	$109,195,760	$236,350,661	
The Fast and the Furious: Tokyo Drift	June 16, 2006	$85 million	$23,973,840	$62,514,415	$96,450,195	$158,964,610	
Fast & Furious	April 3, 2009	$85 million	$70,950,500	$155,064,265	$205,302,605	$360,366,870	
Fast Five	April 29, 2011	$125 million	$86,198,765	$209,837,675	$416,300,000	$626,137,675	
Fast & Furious 6	May 24, 2013	$160 million	$97,375,245	$238,679,850	$550,001,118	$788,680,968	
Furious 7	April 3, 2015	$190 million	$147,187,040	$353,007,020	$1,162,334,379	$1,515,341,399	
The Fate of the Furious	April 14, 2017	$250 million	$98,786,705	$226,008,385	$1,009,996,733	$1,236,005,118	
Fast & Furious Presents: Hobbs & Shaw	August 2, 2019	$200 million	$60,038,950	$173,956,935	$586,775,991	$760,732,926	
F9	June 25, 2021	$200 million	$70,043,165	$173,005,945	$553,223,556	$726,229,501	
Fast X	May 19, 2023	$378.8 million	$67,017,410	$145,960,660	$568,594,889	$714,555,549	
Total		$1.749 billion		$2,010,132,811	$5,326,557,035	$7,476,903,108	

Critical and public response to the Fast & Furious films
Film	Critical		Public
Film	Rotten Tomatoes	Metacritic	CinemaScore
The Fast and the Furious	55% (155 reviews)	58 (34 reviews)	B+
2 Fast 2 Furious	37% (160 reviews)	38 (36 reviews)	A−
The Fast and the Furious: Tokyo Drift	38% (141 reviews)	45 (32 reviews)	A−
Fast & Furious	29% (178 reviews)	46 (28 reviews)	A−
Fast Five	78% (207 reviews)	66 (41 reviews)	A
Fast & Furious 6	71% (210 reviews)	61 (39 reviews)	A
Furious 7	82% (279 reviews)	67 (50 reviews)	A
The Fate of the Furious	67% (310 reviews)	56 (45 reviews)	A
Fast & Furious Presents: Hobbs & Shaw	67% (342 reviews)	60 (54 reviews)	A−
F9	59% (316 reviews)	58 (54 reviews)	B+
Fast X	57% (315 reviews)	56 (59 reviews)	B+

== Music ==
Details of the soundtracks to Fast & Furious films
Title	U.S. release date	Length	Performed by	Label
The Fast and the Furious: Original Motion Picture Soundtrack	June 5, 2001	72:13	Various Artists	Murder Inc. Def Jam; Universal
More Fast and Furious	December 18, 2001	51:06	Various Artists	Island
The Fast and the Furious (Original Motion Picture Score)	February 2026	44:00	BT	Binary Acoustics
2 Fast 2 Furious: Soundtrack	May 27, 2003	42:29	Various Artists	Def Jam South; Disturbing Tha Peace
The Fast and the Furious: Tokyo Drift (Original Motion Picture Soundtrack)	June 20, 2006	38:29	Various Artists	Universal Motown
The Fast and the Furious: Tokyo Drift (Original Motion Picture Score)	June 27, 2006	64:10	Brian Tyler	Varèse Sarabande
Fast & Furious: Original Motion Picture Soundtrack	March 31, 2009	44:01	Various Artists	Star Trak; Interscope
Fast & Furious: Original Motion Picture Score	April 28, 2009	78:11	Brian Tyler	Varèse Sarabande
Fast Five: Original Motion Picture Soundtrack	April 25, 2011	50:48	Various Artists	ABKCO
Fast Five: Original Motion Picture Score	May 3, 2011	77:52	Brian Tyler	Varèse Sarabande
Fast & Furious 6: Original Motion Picture Soundtrack	May 17, 2013	50:18	Various Artists	Def Jam
Furious 7: Original Motion Picture Soundtrack	March 17, 2015	60:05	Various Artists	Atlantic
Furious 7: Original Motion Picture Score	March 31, 2015	76:42	Brian Tyler	Back Lot
The Fate of the Furious: The Album	April 14, 2017	49:50	Various Artists	APG; Atlantic
The Fate of the Furious: Original Motion Picture Score	April 28, 2017	77:16	Brian Tyler	Back Lot
Fast & Furious Presents: Hobbs & Shaw (Original Motion Picture Soundtrack)	July 26, 2019	50:10	Various Artists	Back Lot
Fast & Furious Presents: Hobbs & Shaw (Original Motion Picture Score)	August 2, 2019	40:33	Tyler Bates	Back Lot
Road to Fast 9	July 31, 2020	35:17	Various Artists	Atlantic
F9: The Fast Saga (Original Motion Picture Soundtrack)	June 17, 2021	39:12	Various Artists	Atlantic
F9: The Fast Saga (Original Motion Picture Score)	July 2, 2021	114:16	Brian Tyler	Back Lot
Fast X: Original Motion Picture Soundtrack	May 19, 2023	49:49	Various Artists	APG
Fast X: Original Motion Picture Score	June 2, 2023	103:47	Brian Tyler	Back Lot

Singles from soundtracks to Fast & Furious films
Title	U.S. release date	Length	Artist(s)	Label
"Good Life (Remix)"	2001	3:59	Faith Evans, Ja Rule, Vita and Caddillac Tah	Murder Inc. Def Jam
"Act a Fool"	May 20, 2003	4:30	Ludacris	Def Jam South; DTP
"Tokyo Drift"	June 7, 2006	4:51	Teriyaki Boyz	Star Trak
"Blanco"	March 24, 2009	3:23	Pitbull and Pharrell Williams	Star Trak
"Danza Kuduro"	August 15, 2010	3:19	Don Omar and Lucenzo	ABKCO
"How We Roll (Fast Five Remix)"	April 23, 2011	3:56	Don Omar, J-Doe, Reek da Villian and Busta Rhymes	ABKCO
"Furiously Dangerous"	April 25, 2011	4:04	Ludacris, Slaughterhouse and Claret Jai	ABKCO
"We Own It"	June 12, 2013	3:47	2 Chainz and Wiz Khalifa	Def Jam
"Ride Out"	February 17, 2015	3:31	Kid Ink, Tyga, Wale, YG and Rich Homie Quan	Atlantic
"How Bad Do You Want It (Oh Yeah)"	February 23, 2015	3:44	Sevyn Streeter	Atlantic
"See You Again"	March 10, 2015	3:49	Wiz Khalifa and Charlie Puth	Atlantic
"Go Off"	March 2, 2017	3:37	Lil Uzi Vert, Quavo and Travis Scott	APG; Atlantic; Universal
"Hey Ma"	March 10, 2017	3:14	Pitbull, J Balvin and Camila Cabello	APG; Atlantic; Universal
"Good Life"	March 17, 2017	3:45	G-Eazy and Kehlani	APG; Atlantic; Universal
"Gang Up"	March 24, 2017	3:51	Young Thug, 2 Chainz, Wiz Khalifa and PnB Rock	Atlantic
"Horses"	March 31, 2017	4:09	PnB Rock, Kodak Black, and A Boogie Wit Da Hoodie	APG; Atlantic
"Getting Started"	July 2, 2019	2:45	Aloe Blacc and JID	Black Lot
"One Shot"	June 18, 2020	3:16	YoungBoy Never Broke Again and Lil Baby	Never Broke Again
"Convertible Burt"	July 2, 2020	2:55	Tory Lanez and Kevin Gates	—N/a
"I Won"	June 4, 2021	2:55	Ty Dolla Sign, Jack Harlow and 24kGoldn	Atlantic; Universal
"Fast Lane"	June 11, 2021	2:52	Don Toliver, Lil Durk and Latto	Atlantic; Universal
"Bussin Bussin"	June 18, 2021	2:20	Lil Tecca	Atlantic; Universal
"What You Do"	July 27, 2022	3:14	James T. Crawford	UPM
"Let's Ride"	February 10, 2023	3:11	YG, Ty Dolla Sign and Lambo4oe	APG; Universal
"Gasolina (Safari Riot Remix)"	April 19, 2023	2:32	Daddy Yankee and Myke Towers	APG; Universal
"Won't Back Down"	May 4, 2023	2:49	Youngboy Never Broke Again, Bailey Zimmerman and Dermot Kennedy	APG; Universal
"Toretto"	May 12, 2023	3:11	J Balvin	APG; Universal
"Angel Pt. 1"	May 18, 2023	2:55	Kodak Black, NLE Choppa, Jimin, Jvke and Muni Long	APG; Atlantic

== Other media ==
=== Theme park and museum attractions ===
After the release of Tokyo Drift in 2006, Universal began introducing theme park attractions. From 2006 to 2013, The Fast and the Furious: Extreme Close-Up attraction was included as part of the Studio Tour at Universal Studios Hollywood. The tour's tram would enter a small arena, which featured a demonstration of prop vehicles being manipulated by articulated robotic arms.

Another attraction, Fast & Furious: Supercharged, opened as part of the Studio Tour at Universal Studios Hollywood in 2015. The tour's tram passes the Dodge Chargers used in the fifth film, as riders are shown a video of Luke Hobbs, who informs them a high-valued witness sought by Owen Shaw is on the tram. The tram enters a warehouse party, where the cast appear via a Pepper's ghost effect, before the party is shut down by the FBI and the tram moves into a motion simulator where a chase sequence ensues, led by Roman Pearce, Letty Ortiz and Dominic Toretto. A similar attraction opened at Universal Studios Florida in 2018. In the queue, guests pass through a garage with memorabilia from the films before getting a video call from Tej Parker and Mia Toretto inviting them to a party. Guests board "party buses", where they get the video message from Hobbs and the ride proceeds as it does in the Hollywood version. The Hollywood version closed on March 11, 2025, while the Florida version closed on August 17, 2026.

On July 12, 2023, it was announced that a Fast & Furious-themed roller coaster was being built at Universal Studios Hollywood. The coaster was revealed as Fast & Furious: Hollywood Drift and will open in 2026. The coaster train features four passenger cars from the movies that individually spin 360 degrees. The four cars are modeled after Dominic Toretto's 1970 Dodge Charger R/T, Han Lue's 1997 Mazda RX-7 and both Brian O'Conner's 2002 Nissan Skyline GT-R R34 / 1994 Toyota Supra MK IV.

A similar version of the coaster will open at Universal Studios Florida in 2027.

From March 14, 2026 to April 2027, the Petersen Automotive Museum is holding an exhibit titled "A Fast & Furious Legacy: 25 Years of Automotive Icons" features several cars from the franchise, including the Nissan 240SX and 1993 Toyota Supra from the first film, the 2001 Honda S2000 from the second film, and the 1968 Dodge Charger R/T and a 1993 Mazda RX-7 driven by Diesel in the first film.

=== Tour ===
In 2018, Universal announced Fast & Furious Live, a series of live shows which combine stunt driving, pyrotechnics and projection mapping to recreate scenes from the films and perform other stunts. During production, thousands of stunt performers and drivers auditioned and were required to undergo a four-month training camp if selected. Additionally, parkour athletes and stunts requiring both drivers and parkour practitioners, also featured.

The tour was panned by critics. Ryan Gilbey of The Guardian wrote "large sections of seating were closed off; entire rows in the rest of it were empty" and "the only danger in Fast & Furious Live is the audience might die of carbon monoxide poisoning. Or boredom." Adam White of The Daily Telegraph gave the show a two out of five rating, commenting that "Fast & Furious Live often feels like an elaborate if lethargic playground game, one hinging almost entirely on imagination."

The tour was a financial failure; the show's production company entered administration in summer 2018 and all the cars and equipment was auctioned off in 2019.

=== Video games ===
A video game based on the first movie was planned to be released in November 2003 for the PlayStation 2 and in 2004 for the Xbox, but was cancelled for unknown reasons. It was planned to be developed by Genki and published by Vivendi Universal Games under the Universal Interactive label.

The arcade racing game The Fast and the Furious, loosely based on the first installment, was released in 2004 by Raw Thrills. It was designed by Eugene Jarvis, the creator of the Cruis'n series of games, and shares much of the same gameplay. It was ported to the Wii without the Fast & Furious license as Cruis'n in 2007. Three arcade sequels followed, The Fast and the Furious: Drift in 2007, drawing on elements of the third film, Fast & Furious: SuperCars in 2011, and Fast & Furious Arcade in 2022.

A 2006 game The Fast and the Furious was released for the PlayStation 2 and PlayStation Portable and drew heavy inspiration from Tokyo Drift. It received mixed reviews and sold moderately.

A mobile game also titled The Fast and the Furious was likewise released in 2004, followed by a sequel, 2 Fast 2 Furious, released in the same year exclusively for mobile phones and based on the second film. Several other games have been released for iOS and Android devices, including Fast & Furious, Fast Five, Fast & Furious: Adrenaline, Fast & Furious 6: The Game, Fast & Furious: Legacy and Fast & Furious Takedown.

Fast & Furious: Showdown was released in 2013 for Microsoft Windows, Xbox 360, PlayStation 3, Wii U, and Nintendo 3DS. It marked the second game for consoles, and players controls multiple characters; its narrative was designed around the gap between the fifth and sixth film. It was released to negative reviews and middling financial success.

Various cars, locations and characters from the franchise appeared in the Facebook game Car Town.

In 2015, in a deal with Microsoft Studios, an expansion of Forza Horizon 2 was released for Xbox 360 and Xbox One, titled Forza Horizon 2 Presents: Fast & Furious. It was released to promote Furious 7 and received generally positive reception, although some critics lamented the limited involvement from the titular characters. In 2017, the vehicular soccer game Rocket League released a downloadable content (DLC) pack in promotion for The Fate of the Furious, where players would be able to purchase the Dodge Charger from the film as well as its exclusive wheels and six other new customizations.

Fast & Furious Crossroads was announced at The Game Awards 2019. The game was originally scheduled for release in May 2020 but was delayed due to logistical problems caused by the COVID-19 pandemic. It was eventually released for Microsoft Windows, PlayStation 4, and Xbox One on August 7, 2020 to largely negative reception.

Fast & Furious: Spy Racers Rise of SH1FT3R was released in 2021. The 2023 release Hot Wheels Unleashed 2: Turbocharged features crossover themed vehicles from the franchise, followed by a car pack expansion of the game Forza Horizon 5 released in December 2023, featuring five vehicles from Fast X.

=== Toys ===
In 2002, RadioShack sold ZipZaps micro radio-controlled car versions of cars from the first film, while diecast metal manufacturer Racing Champions released replicas of cars from the first two installments in different scales from 1/18 to 1/64, in 2004.

AMT Ertl rivaled the cars released by Racing Champions by producing 1/24-scale plastic model kits in 2004, while Johnny Lightning, under the JL Full Throttle Brand, released 1/64 and 1/24 models of the cars from Tokyo Drift. These models were designed by renowned diecast designer Eric Tscherne. In 2011, Universal licensed the company Greenlight to sell model cars from all films in anticipation for Fast Five. Since 2013, Hot Wheels has released 1/64 models of every car from and since the sixth installment.

In 2020, LEGO produced a set in their Technic line of Dom's Dodge Charger. In June 2022, The Lego Group unveiled Dominic Toretto's 1970 Dodge Charger R/T which was released as part of the Lego Speed Champions theme on August 1, 2022. It consists of 345 pieces, and includes a Dominic Toretto minifigure. On January 1, 2023, the LEGO Group released Brian O'Conner's Nissan Skyline GT-R, also as part of the Speed Champions theme. It consists of 319 pieces, and includes a Brian O'Conner minifigure.

=== Board games ===
Game Salute released a board game based on the series called Fast & Furious: Full Throttle in 2015. It is a card-based game which uses hand management and grid movement to simulate a street race. Players can choose from 12 of the movie characters and customise their cars to create a game advantage. The board game was launched on Kickstarter in April 2015, and was successfully funded. Another game released in 2015 was Atlas Games' Fast and Fhtagn, a Fast & Furious cross over with Cthulhu theming. The competitive street racing game uses dice rolling and hand management to control players cars.

Funko Games released a board game based on the series called Fast & Furious: Highway Heist in 2021. It is a co-operative game for 2-4 players who choose characters and cars from the films to play through three scenarios - a tank fight, a semi-heist and a helicopter fight.

Beyond specifically themed games, a variety of game re-skins have also been released including titles such as Uno Fast & Furious and Fast & Furious Monopoly.

=== Fashion ===
In November 2022, streetwear retailer Dumbgood collaborated with Fast & Furious on a legacy collection featuring t-shirts, shirts, and track pants containing moments and characters from the films. The collection was positively reviewed by Eric Brian of Hypebeast, who wrote, "Dumbgood's offering is more than just a selection of merch, but is positioned right at the center of car culture and the community around the films".

== Social impact ==
The series, particularly the first few films, helped popularize the import scene and car tuning. According to the LA Times, there are some Los Angeles Police Department (LAPD) officers who blame the Fast & Furious films for popularizing street racing in the city. In August 2022, residents of Los Angeles held a protest against the filming of Fast X, claiming the movies promote illegal street racing.

The franchise has been credited with increasing onscreen diversity, and has had broad appeal across multiple demographics. Furious 7 was one of the few American blockbusters which had a majority non-White viewership: 37 percent of its audience was reportedly Latino; 25 percent White; 24 percent Black; and 10 percent was Asian. In a 2011 article about the series's casting, Wesley Morris wrote:

Movies about race still tend to be self-congratulatory or mine tension for comedy ... The Fast and Furious movies, by contrast, are free of this angst. They're basically a prolonged party for a ring of street-racing urban car thieves.

== See also ==
- List of highest-grossing film franchises
- Børning, a 2014 Norwegian street racing action comedy film that took inspiration from the Fast & Furious films
- Initial D (1995 debut), a Japanese street racing media franchise pre-dating Fast & Furious (particularly Tokyo Drift) with many similarities between the two franchises.
- Thunderbolt (1995 film), a Jackie Chan racing action film with similarities to Fast & Furious
- Torque, a 2004 American film with similar thematic elements but involving high speed performance motorcycles.
