= Good Life (G-Eazy and Kehlani song) =

Single by G-Eazy and Kehlani

from the album The Fate of the Furious: The Album
- Released: March 17, 2017
- Genre: Pop rap
- Length: 3:45
- Label: Atlantic
- Songwriters: Gerald Gillum; Kehlani Parrish; Benjamin Diehl; Marco Rodriguez Diaz; Jason Evigan; Holly Hafermann; Justin Franks; Danny Majic; Andrew Thomas; Moses Davis; Steven Marsden; Vanessa Carlton; Dean Mundy
- Producers: Infamous; Ben Billions; Vlad Filatov

G-Eazy singles chronology
"Say Less" (2017)	"Good Life" (2017)	"I'm On 3.0" (2017)

Kehlani singles chronology
"Keep On" (2017)	"Good Life" (2017)	"Heebiejeebies" (2017)

Fast & Furious soundtrack singles chronology
"Hey Ma" (2017)	"Good Life" (2017)	"Gang Up" (2017)

Music video
- "Good Life" on YouTube

"Good Life" is a song recorded by American rapper G-Eazy and American singer Kehlani, taken from the soundtrack for The Fate of the Furious (2017).

== Music video ==
The accompanying music video for "Good Life" was shot in Downtown Los Angeles, it was uploaded on Kehlani's YouTube channel on March 17, 2017. Scenes from The Fate of the Furious appear in the music video featuring appearances from actors Vin Diesel, Jason Statham, Michelle Rodriguez, Kurt Russell, Scott Eastwood, Nathalie Emmanuel, Dwayne Johnson, Tyrese Gibson, Eden Estrella and Ludacris.

== Charts ==
=== Weekly charts ===
Chart (2017)	Peak position
Australia (ARIA)	23
Austria (Ö3 Austria Top 40)	16
Belgium (Ultratip Bubbling Under Flanders)	3
Belgium (Ultratip Bubbling Under Wallonia)	7
Canada Hot 100 (Billboard)	53
Czech Republic Airplay (ČNS IFPI)	27
Czech Republic Singles Digital (ČNS IFPI)	11
Denmark (Tracklisten)	27
France (SNEP)	156
Germany (GfK)	15
Ireland (IRMA)	32
Italy (FIMI)	52
Japan Hot 100 (Billboard)	15
Malaysia (RIM)	3
Netherlands (Single Top 100)	67
New Zealand (Recorded Music NZ)	21
Norway (VG-lista)	8
Philippines (Philippine Hot 100)	45
Portugal (AFP)	27
Slovakia Airplay (ČNS IFPI)	57
Slovakia Singles Digital (ČNS IFPI)	21
Sweden (Sverigetopplistan)	53
Switzerland (Schweizer Hitparade)	13
UK Singles (OCC)	53
US Billboard Hot 100	59
US Hot R&B/Hip-Hop Songs (Billboard)	29
US Pop Airplay (Billboard)	35

=== Year-end charts ===
Chart (2017)	Position
Japan (Japan Hot 100)	93
Switzerland (Schweizer Hitparade)	90

== Certifications ==
Region	Certification	Certified units/sales
Australia (ARIA)	Platinum	70,000^{‡}
Canada (Music Canada)	2× Platinum	160,000^{‡}
Denmark (IFPI Danmark)	Gold	45,000^{‡}
Germany (BVMI)	Gold	200,000^{‡}
Italy (FIMI)	Gold	25,000^{‡}
New Zealand (RMNZ)	Platinum	30,000^{‡}
United Kingdom (BPI)	Silver	200,000^{‡}
United States (RIAA)	Platinum	1,000,000^{‡}
Streaming
Japan (RIAJ)	Platinum	100,000,000^{†}
^{‡} Sales+streaming figures based on certification alone.^{†} Streaming-only figures based on certification alone.
