= Crazy Rich Asians (soundtrack) =

2018 movie soundtrack album

Crazy Rich Asians: Original Motion Picture Soundtrack

Soundtrack album by Various artists
- Released: August 10, 2018
- Length: 45:20
- Label: WaterTower Music
- Producer: Jon M. Chu

Crazy Rich Asians: Original Motion Picture Score

Film score by Brian Tyler
- Released: August 10, 2018
- Studio: Eastwood Scoring Stage (Burbank, California)
- Genre: Film score; jazz
- Length: 1:03:39
- Label: WaterTower Music
- Producer: Brian Tyler

Brian Tyler chronology
The Mummy: Original Motion Picture Soundtrack (2017)	Crazy Rich Asians: Original Motion Picture Score (2018)	Escape Room (2019)

Crazy Rich Asians is a 2018 American romantic comedy-drama film directed by Jon M. Chu from a screenplay by Peter Chiarelli and Adele Lim. The film was accompanied by both a soundtrack album (with contributions from various artists) and an original motion picture score album (composed by Brian Tyler). The film stars Constance Wu, Henry Golding, Gemma Chan, Awkwafina, Nico Santos, Lisa Lu, Ken Jeong, and Michelle Yeoh and follows a young Asian-American woman who travels to meet her boyfriend's family and is surprised when she discovers they are among the richest in Singapore.

Crazy Rich Asians was released in the United States on August 15, 2018, by Warner Bros. Pictures and August 23, 2018, internationally. It is noted as the first film in the modern setting by a major Hollywood studio to feature a majority Asian cast since 1993's The Joy Luck Club. The film has grossed over $238 million worldwide and received positive reviews from critics, who praised the performances and the production design. A sequel is in development.

== Background ==
During the film's production process, director Jon M. Chu and music supervisor Gabe Hilfer assembled a list of hundreds of songs about money, including songs by Kanye West ("Gold Digger"), Hall & Oates ("Rich Girl"), the Notorious B.I.G. ("Mo Money Mo Problems"), Lady Gaga ("Money Honey"), and Barrett Strong ("Money (That's What I Want)"). Seeking to create a multilingual soundtrack, Chu and Hilfer compiled Chinese songs from the 1950s and 1960s by Ge Lan (Grace Chang) and Yao Lee, as well as contemporary songs, and then searched through YouTube videos for singers fluent in Mandarin Chinese to provide cover versions of songs.

Two versions of "Money (That's What I Want)" were performed—one in English and one in Chinese—by Malaysian singer Cheryl K, who had originally auditioned for the film singing "Mamma Knows Best" by Jessie J. Awkwafina, who is also a rapper, contributed a few verses to the end credits version but recorded her parts in a separate studio. The soundtrack includes a Chinese cover of "I Want You to Be My Baby" performed by Ge, and another version performed by Chinese jazz singer Jasmine Chen, who was also featured in the film. A choreographed dance number accompanied the song but was ultimately cut for the theatrical release.

"My New Swag" is a collaboration with Chinese rappers VaVa and Ty., both of whom competed on The Rap of China. Taiwanese-Hong Kong singer Sally Yeh had previously recorded a Cantonese cover of Madonna's "Material Girl"; since Madonna was not one of its songwriters, the artist's permission was not required for the song's inclusion. To accompany the film's wedding scene, a cover of Elvis Presley's "Can't Help Falling in Love" was rerecorded for the film by Japanese–American singer and YouTuber Kina Grannis.

A Chinese cover of Coldplay's 2000 song "Yellow" plays over the final scenes of Crazy Rich Asians. Coldplay was initially hesitant about the song's use in the movie. Since Chu was unsatisfied with using other songs like "Stay" by Rihanna and songs by Sia in its place, he wrote a passionate letter directed to the members of the band to convince them to allow the song to be used in the film, speaking to his relationship with the word "yellow" as an Asian-American and his hope to reappropriate the term in the last scene of the movie. The request was approved in less than 24 hours. After Li Wenqi, a Chinese singer from the third season of The Voice of China, declined to reprise her cover of the song from the competition series (which had been used by Hilfer in test screenings), "Yellow" was eventually recorded by Katherine Ho, who competed on the tenth season of The Voice (US). "Vote" is an original song by Miguel, produced by Mark Ronson and Hudson Mohawke.

The film's soundtrack album and score album, by Brian Tyler, were both released on August 10, 2018, through WaterTower Music.

== Track listings ==
Crazy Rich Asians: Original Motion Picture Soundtrack
No.	Title	Writer(s)	Performer(s)	Length
1.	"Waiting for Your Return"	Hua Shen; Hong Zhao Yuan	Jasmine Chen	2:58
2.	"Money (That's What I Want)"	Janie Bradford; Berry Gordy Jr.	Cheryl K	3:12
3.	"Wo Yao Ni De Ai (I Want Your Love – I Want You to Be My Baby)" (我要你的愛)	Jon Hendricks	Ge Lan	2:43
4.	"My New Swag"	Double G; Kas; VaVa; Ty	VaVa featuring Ty. and Nina Wang	4:05
5.	"Give Me a Kiss"	Marshall Brown; Alden Shuman; Earl Shuman	Jasmine Chen	3:01
6.	"Ren Sheng Jiu Shi Xi" (Dian Ying "Ru Shi Jia Ren" Cha Qu / from the soundtrack to the film Ru shi jia ren)	Di Yi Chen; Ming Yao	Yao Lee (姚莉)	3:04
7.	"Ni Dong Bu Dong (Do You Understand)" (你懂不懂)	Tsin Chin Lee; Ming Yao	Lilan Chen (陳蘭麗)	2:32
8.	"Wo Yao Fei Shang Qing Tian" (Dian Ying "Kong Zhong Xiao Jie" Cha Qu / from the soundtrack to the film Air Hostess)	Ming Yao	Ge Lan	3:18
9.	"Material Girl (200 Du)" (200度)	Peter Brown; Robert Rans	Sally Yeh	4:29
10.	"Can't Help Falling in Love"	Luigi Creatore; George David Weiss; Hugo Peretti	Kina Grannis	3:21
11.	"Wo Yao Ni De Ai (I Want Your Love – I Want You to Be My Baby)"	Hendricks	Jasmine Chen	2:04
12.	"Yellow"	William Champion; Jonathan Buckland; Christopher Martin; Guy Berryman	Katherine Ho	4:08
13.	"Vote"	Miguel Pimentel; Mark Ronson; Ricky Witherspoon; Ross Birchard; Jeremy Coleman; Noel Fisher; Jason Pounds	Miguel	3:22
14.	"Money (That's What I Want)"	Bradford; Gordy Jr.	Cheryl K featuring Awkwafina	3:12

Crazy Rich Asians: Original Motion Picture Score
No.	Title	Length
1.	"Love Theme from Crazy Rich Asians"	2:52
2.	"Text Ting Swing"	3:53
3.	"Approaching the Palace"	1:44
4.	"Astrid" (contains an interpolation of "Blues for Jean", written by Neal Hefti)	5:17
5.	"Solitude"	2:26
6.	"Astrid and the Earrings"	1:41
7.	"Arrival in Singapore"	2:35
8.	"Rainy Nights in London"	2:46
9.	"Rachel's Story"	2:31
10.	"Shopping Spree"	1:38
11.	"First Class"	1:04
12.	"Hide the Jimmy Choos"	2:53
13.	"Cousin Eddie and Cousin Alistair"	1:19
14.	"Choices"	3:34
15.	"We'll Get Through It Together"	3:08
16.	"Astrid and Rachel"	1:31
17.	"Without Reseration"	2:40
18.	"Family First"	1:57
19.	"Lost in the Jungle"	0:49
20.	"Lunch on the Goh"	3:17
21.	"Parallel Decisions"	4:36
22.	"Running Away"	2:19
23.	"Because of Me"	3:09
24.	"Jubilee Bop"	3:59

== Charts ==
Chart (2018)	Peak position
US Digital Albums (Billboard)	16
US Independent Albums (Billboard)	8
US Soundtrack Albums (Billboard)	11
US Top Album Sales (Billboard)	70
US World Albums (Billboard)	3
