= The Mummy (2017 soundtrack) =

The Mummy (Original Motion Picture Soundtrack)

Film score by Brian Tyler
- Released: June 9, 2017 (standard); June 16, 2017 (deluxe)
- Recorded: 2015–2017
- Studios: Abbey Road Studios, London
- Genre: Film score
- Length: 74:26 (standard); 124:25 (deluxe)
- Label: Back Lot Music
- Producer: Brian Tyler

Brian Tyler chronology
The Fate of the Furious (Original Motion Picture Score) (2017)	The Mummy (Original Motion Picture Soundtrack) (2017)	Crazy Rich Asians (Original Motion Picture Score) (2018)

The Mummy (Original Motion Picture Soundtrack) is the soundtrack album to the 2017 film The Mummy directed by Alex Kurtzman, which is the reboot of the Mummy franchise, starring Tom Cruise, Sofia Boutella, Annabelle Wallis, Jake Johnson, Courtney B. Vance, and Russell Crowe. The original score is composed by Brian Tyler and performed by the London Philharmonic Orchestra and the London Philharmonic Choir. It was recorded at the Abbey Road Studios for around two-and-a-half years.

The soundtrack consisted of 21 tracks which runs for 74 minutes and released through Back Lot Music on June 9, 2017, concurrent with the film's release. An accompanying deluxe edition, which included an additional 15 tracks that extended its runtime for around two hours, released a week later.

== Development ==
The musical score is composed by Brian Tyler who worked with Alex Kurtzman on several projects. Tyler found it challenging to work on the score, as the film combines adventure and horror, something he never tried. He started working on the film's music even before the production began. It took him nearly a year-and-half to complete the score, ultimately recording over two hours of the film's music, which, given the duration of the film (110 minutes), resulted in a soundtrack that was longer than the film itself. Tyler added that "there was more music than they could actually put in the theatrical version". Hence, he composed extra themes for the mythology and backstory of the ancient Egypt and had composed different melodic themes which were traditional so that it could clarify the narrative.

The score was also linked to the classic scores from The Mummy franchise which had provided a vague sense of ancient Egypt and utilized choir to invoke a sense of mystery and evil. He also instructed the choir to sing Egyptian words and phrases so that would relate to the history, referencing Hans J. Salter's work for The Mummy's Hand (1940). The "plodding, quarter-note cyclical theme" was a nod to James Dietrich, the composer of the 1932 original film, and the middle Eastern combination of wordless choir was also a nod to Franz Reizenstein's score for the 1959 British remake. He also used a reference of Jerry Goldsmith's score for the 1999 film in a sequence when Jenny (Annabelle Wallis) uses the Book of the Dead as a weapon in a brief scene in the film, as a throwaway, although a key plot element in the 1999 film.

Tyler utilized several ancient Middle Eastern musical instruments such as ney, mizmar, sistrum and qanun. He also played Egyptian percussion, something which he tried for the television series Frank Herbert's Children of Dune. He also emphasized on orchestral music to provide all elements of a classic film and a classic kind of style score. Recorded at the Abbey Road Studios, London, Tyler conducted the score performed by the London Philharmonic Orchestra which featured 84 musicians playing the orchestral pieces. Allan Wilson conducted the 32-member choir performed by London Philharmonic Choir. Tyler performed the score at the film-music concert held at Royal Festival Hall in May 2016, which further saw the attendance of Cruise and Boutella.

== Reception ==
Jonathan Broxton of Movie Music UK called "Brian Tyler has set the bar high with his score for this film [...] It's got themes, it's got blazing action, it's got a full orchestra and choir, and it overflows with creativity. Really, what more could you want?" James Southall of Movie Wave wrote "The Mummy is a tremendous piece of entertainment. The pair of main themes gives it a melodically memorable core, a quality which can't be understated in 2017." Filmtracks wrote "This score isn't Tyler's best, but it resides in that higher echelon for him, and the suites at the very least make for some of the most entertaining fantasy music to come from the composer in years." Robert Abele of TheWrap called it as a "charging, insisting score like the rote groans from a factory."

== Track listing ==
The Mummy (Original Motion Picture Soundtrack) – standard edition track listing
No.	Title	Length
1.	"The Mummy"	4:29
2.	"The Secret of the Mummy"	4:41
3.	"Nick's Theme"	2:04
4.	"Prodigium"	2:51
5.	"Egypt's Next Great Queen"	3:23
6.	"Sandstorm"	1:12
7.	"The Call of the Ancients"	3:34
8.	"A Sense of Adventure"	2:40
9.	"Haram"	4:25
10.	"A Warning of Monsters"	6:07
11.	"Providence"	1:59
12.	"The Sand of Wrath"	2:43
13.	"The Lost Tomb of Ahmanet"	2:35
14.	"Concourse of the Undead"	5:00
15.	"Iniquity"	2:12
16.	"Chaos, Mayhem, Destruction"	4:43
17.	"Power and Temptation"	1:29
18.	"Unstoppable"	4:15
19.	"Destiny"	8:22
20.	"Sentience"	3:19
21.	"Between Life and Death"	2:23
Total length:		74:26

The Mummy (Original Motion Picture Soundtrack) – deluxe edition track listing
No.	Title	Length
1.	"The Mummy"	4:29
2.	"The Secret of the Mummy"	4:41
3.	"Nick's Theme"	2:04
4.	"Prodigium"	2:51
5.	"Egypt's Next Great Queen"	3:23
6.	"Sandstorm"	1:12
7.	"The Call of the Ancients"	3:34
8.	"A Sense of Adventure"	2:40
9.	"Haram"	4:25
10.	"A Warning of Monsters"	6:07
11.	"The Lost Tomb of Ahmanet"	2:35
12.	"Providence"	1:59
13.	"The Sand of Wrath"	2:43
14.	"Enchantments"	1:06
15.	"Concourse of the Undead"	5:00
16.	"World of Monsters"	2:33
17.	"She is Risen"	4:04
18.	"Chaos, Mayhem, Destruction"	4:43
19.	"Sanction of the Gods"	3:07
20.	"Unstoppable"	4:15
21.	"Beyond Evil"	2:14
22.	"Power and Temptation"	1:29
23.	"Inquest"	1:36
24.	"Forward Momentum"	3:46
25.	"Set"	3:25
26.	"Pathogen of Evil"	2:04
27.	"Liberators of Precious Antiquities"	1:48
28.	"Dawn of Evil"	4:02
29.	"Sepulcher"	4:43
30.	"Iniquity"	2:12
31.	"The Calling"	2:35
32.	"Possession of the Knight's Tomb"	2:43
33.	"Destiny"	8:22
34.	"Sentience"	3:19
35.	"Between Life and Death"	2:23
36.	"The Mummy End Title Suite"	10:13
Total length:		124:25

== Personnel ==
Credits adapted from liner notes:

- Music composer – Brian Tyler
- Music producer – Brian Tyler, Joe Lisanti
- Music arrangements – Chris Forsgren, Evan Duffy, John Carey, M.R. Miller
- Mixing – Brian Tyler, Frank Wolf
- Mastering – Patricia Sullivan
- Score recording engineer – Greg Hayes, Simon Rhodes
- Assistant recording engineer – Stefano Civetta
- Digital score recordists – Gordon Davidson, Larry Mah
- Supervising music editor – Erich Stratmann, Joe Lisanti
- Additional music editor – Kyle Clausen, Mark Jan Wlodarkiewicz, Matthew Llewllyn, Michael Bauer
- Scoring coordinator – Merissa Fernandez
- Copyist – Ann Barnard, Jill Streater
- Music preparation – Janis Stonerook
- Packaging and design – Brian Porizek
- Music business and legal affairs for Universal Pictures – Kyle Staggs, Tanya Perara
- Executive in charge of music for Universal Pictures – Mike Knobloch
- Production and marketing for Back Lot Music – Jake Voulgarides, Nikki Walsh
- Music supervision for Universal Pictures – Angela Leus

Orchestra

- Performer – The Philharmonia Orchestra
- Orchestration – Andrew Kinney, Brad Warnaar, Breton Vivian, Dana Niu, Emily Rice, Jeff Toyne, Larry Rench, M.R. Miller, Robert Elhai, Rossano Galante
- Orchestra conductor – Brian Tyler
- Orchestra contractor – Paul Talkington
- Concertmaster – Zsolt-Tihamér Visontay

Choir

- Performer – London Philharmonic Choir
- Choir conductor and contractor – Allan Wilson
- Alto and mezzo-soprano vocals – Alex Gibson, Cathy Bell, Diana Moore, Judy Brown, Kate Mapp, Lorna Perry, Nicola Beckley, Sue Rann
- Bass vocals – Charles Pott, Christian Goursaud, Chris Foster, Gavin Cranmer-Moralee, Julian Empett, Lawrence White, Michael Bundy, Neil Bellingham
- Soprano vocals – Cheryl Enever, Christina Birchall-Sampson, Elizabeth Roberts, Iris Korfker, Jennifer Clark, Nicola Corbishley, Philippa Murray, Suzanne Wilson
- Tenor vocals – Ben Cooper, Gerard O'Beirne, Graham Neal, James Savage-Hanford, Joe Doody, Malcolm Banham, Nils Greenhow, Tom Herford

Instruments

- Bass – Adam Wynter, Christian Geldsetzer, Gareth Sheppard, Jeremy Watt, Michael Fuller, Neil Tarlton, Simon Oliver, Tim Gibbs
- Bass trombone – Barry Clements
- Bassoon – Luke Whitehead
- Cello – Anna Mowat, Anne Baker, Deirdre Cooper, Ella Rundle, Eric Villeminey, John Heley, Karen Stephenson, Michael Hurwitz, Morwenna Del Mar, Richard Birchall, Timothy Walden, Victoria Simonsen, Harrison Lee
- Clarinet – Laurent Ben Slimane, Mark Van De Wiel
- Duduk – Dirk Campbell
- Flute – June Scott, Karen Jones, Keith Bragg
- Harp – Skaila Kanga
- Horn – Anna Euen, Daniel Curzon, Jonathan Maloney, Katy Woolley, Kira Doherty, Nigel Black, Richard Berry
- Oboe – Tom Blomfield
- Percussion – David Corkhill, Karen Hutt, Peter Fry, Tom Edwards
- Timpani – Antoine Siguré
- Trombone – Andy Wood, Dudley Bright, Philip White
- Trumpet – Alistair Mackie, Jason Evans, Mark Calder, Robert Farley
- Tuba – Peter Smith
- Viola – Amanda Verner, Carol Hultmark, Cheremie Hamilton-Miller, Gijs Kramers, Linda Kidwell, Meghan Cassidy, Michael Turner, Nicholas Bootiman, Rebecca Carrington, Rebecca Chambers, Richard Waters, Yukiko Ogura
- Violin – Adrián Varela, Amelia Conway-Jon, Caroline Frenkel, Cassandra Hamilton, Clare Hoffman, Duncan Riddell, Eleanor Wilkinson, Erzsebet Racz, Eugene Lee, Fabrizio Falasca, Grace Lee, Karin Tilch, Soong Choo, Victoria Irish, Annabelle Meare, Emily Davis, Fiona Cornall, Gideon Robinson, Helena Buckie, Jan Regulski, Julian Milone, Nuno Carapina, Paula Clifton-Everest, Samantha Reagan, Sophie Cameron, Tamás Sándo:
