= Hobbs & Shaw (soundtrack) =

2019 soundtrack album by various artists

Fast & Furious Presents: Hobbs & Shaw (Original Motion Picture Soundtrack)

Soundtrack album by various artists
- Released: July 26, 2019
- Genres: Funk; alternative rock; hip-hop; rap rock
- Length: 50:10
- Label: Back Lot Music

Singles from Fast & Furious Presents: Hobbs & Shaw (Original Motion Picture Soundtrack)
- 1. "Getting Started" Released: July 2, 2019

Fast & Furious Presents: Hobbs & Shaw (Original Motion Picture Soundtrack) is the soundtrack album to the 2019 Fast & Furious spin-off film Hobbs & Shaw. It was released on July 26, 2019, through Back Lot Music, a week before the film's theatrical release. The soundtrack contains several collaborations from different artists which are Yungblud, The Heavy, Logic, Aston Wyld (now Aston), Ohana Bam, Brothers Voodoo, Yonaka, Aloe Blacc, The Movement and Idris Elba who appears in the film. The soundtrack's sole single "Getting Started" by Aloe Blacc featuring J.I.D. was released on July 2, 2019.

"Next Level", a song originally composed for the film, was later covered by South Korean girl band Aespa and released around the time of F9's theatrical release in 2021.

== Track listing ==
Standard Edition
No.	Title	Writer(s)	Producer(s)	Length
1.	"Time in a Bottle" (Yungblud)	Jim Croce	Chris Greatti; Zamudio Cervini	4:35
2.	"Better as One" (The Heavy)	Christopher Ellul; Daniel Taylor; Kelvin Swaby; Spencer Page; Thomas Hunter	Swaby; Taylor; Ellul; Page; Paul Corkett	2:56
3.	"100 Miles and Running" (Logic featuring Wale and John Lindahl)	Sir Robert Hall II; Corinne Bailey Rae; Paris Strother; Darrel Alston; Lucy Rose Parton; Tobias Breuer; Amber Strother	6ix; Logic	5:54
4.	"Next Level" (Aston Wyld)	Adam McInnis; Mario Marchetti; Sophie Curtis	Marchetti; McInnis	2:18
5.	"Even If I Die (Hobbs & Shaw) (Hybrid Remix)" (Idris Elba featuring Cypress Hill and Hybrid)	Elba; Wayne Hector; James Harry Rutherford-Roke; Louis Freese; Rory Taylor; Senen Reyes	Elba; Rory Lyons	5:48
6.	"Keep You Alive" (Brothers Voodoo, Jack Splash and D.A. Wallach)	Wallach; Splash	Splash	4:22
7.	"F.W.T.B. (grandson remix)" (Yonaka and grandson)	Alex Crosby; George Edwards; Rob Mason; Theresa Jarvis	Mike Spencer	3:16
8.	"I'm Comin' Home" (Aloe Blacc and AG)	Blacc; Adrianne Gonzalez	AG	3:16
9.	"Masta" (The Movement and Anonymouz featuring Poetik, SMV, King Kapisi, MC Arme, Mareko and Kas Tha Feelstyle)	Ami Maeli; Bill Urale; David Saotupe; Kas Futialo; Mark Sagapolutele; Matthew Salapu; Melvy James; Ventry Parker	Anonymouz	3:53
10.	"All Roads Lead Home (Hobbs & Shaw Remix)" (Ohana Bam featuring Token)	Benjamin Goldberg; Brenton Smith; Jonathan Pakfar; Shane Abrahams	Pakfar	3:24
11.	"Getting Started (Hobbs & Shaw)" (Aloe Blacc featuring JID)	Ester Dean; Aloe Blacc; Andrew DeRoberts; Dicaprio; Joel Rousseau; Justin Amundrud; Kyle Williams; Ryan Tedder; Shane McAnally; Zach Skelton	Tedder; DeRoberts; Skelton	2:38
12.	"Hobbs & Shaw Rocks!" (Tyler Bates)	Bates; Joanne Higginbottom; Timothy Mark Williams	Bates	5:04
13.	"Even If I Die (Hobbs & Shaw)" (Idris Elba featuring Cypress Hill)	Elba; Rutherford-Roke; Freese; Taylor; Hector; Reyes	Elba; Lyons	2:46
Total length:				50:10

== Charts ==
Chart (2019)	Peak position
US Billboard 200	17

== Fast & Furious Presents: Hobbs & Shaw (Original Motion Picture Score) ==
Fast & Furious Presents: Hobbs & Shaw (Original Motion Picture Score)

Film score by Tyler Bates
- Released: August 2, 2019
- Genre: Film score
- Length: 40:33
- Label: Back Lot Music
- Producer: Tyler Bates

Tyler Bates chronology
John Wick: Chapter 3 – Parabellum (2019)	Fast & Furious Presents: Hobbs & Shaw (Original Motion Picture Score) (2019)	Primal (2020)

Fast & Furious Presents: Hobbs & Shaw (Original Motion Picture Score) is the film score album of the 2019 film of the same name. The score was released by Back Lot Music was released on August 2, 2019, with a total of 18 tracks, and 40 minutes and 33 seconds of music. The score was written and composed by Tyler Bates, who is a frequent collaborator for the film's director David Leitch, having composed the music of his previous films.

All music composed by Tyler Bates.

No.	Title	Length
1.	"Hard Way or Easy Way"	2:01
2.	"Descender"	2:38
3.	"McClaren Chase"	2:48
4.	"Dad's Code Red"	2:38
5.	"Hot Spy Lady"	2:13
6.	"Hack the News"	2:27
7.	"You Might Learn Something"	2:40
8.	"Samoa Siva Tau"	2:47
9.	"Wasted So Much Time"	1:27
10.	"Mike Oxmaul"	1:41
11.	"Bring On the Moonshine"	1:48
12.	"Family Heirlooms"	2:29
13.	"Ring of Fire"	2:05
14.	"Who the Hell Are You"	1:49
15.	"Drones and Explosions"	1:58
16.	"Do the Honors"	2:17
17.	"Shut Him Down"	2:31
18.	"We Believe In People"	2:16
