= One Shot (YoungBoy Never Broke Again song) =

2020 single by YoungBoy Never Broke Again featuring Lil Baby

Single by YoungBoy Never Broke Again featuring Lil Baby

from the album Road to Fast 9
- Released: June 18, 2020
- Length: 3:16
- Label: Never Broke Again
- Songwriters: Kentrell Gaulden; Dominique Jones; Tevin Revell
- Producer: Drum Dummie

YoungBoy Never Broke Again singles chronology
"Trillionaire" (2020)	"One Shot" (2020)	"All In" (2020)

Lil Baby singles chronology
"The Bigger Picture" (2020)	"One Shot" (2020)	"Monday to Sunday" (2020)

Fast & Furious singles chronology
"Getting Started" (2019)	"One Shot" (2020)	"Convertible Burt" (2020)

Music video
- "One Shot" on YouTube

"One Shot" is a song by American rapper YoungBoy Never Broke Again, featuring fellow American rapper Lil Baby. The song was released on June 18, 2020, as the lead single from the Road to Fast 9 mixtape for F9, the ninth film in the Fast & Furious franchise. Two different videos were released for the song, with the second one premiering on July 29, 2020.

== Background ==
"One Shot" is the first release off the Road to Fast 9 mixtape. The mixtape, which serves as the lead up to the official soundtrack of F9, will feature music inspired by the film.

== Composition and lyrics ==
"One Shot" is a "motivational anthem", with the rappers trading bars about "flexin" their riches and chasing the dream, exclaiming how when they get "one shot", they have to take it.

== Music video ==
The music video was written and directed by AJ Bleyer, and released on July 29, 2020. The video, filmed in Los Angeles over two days, follows NBA YoungBoy through a drifting chase scene. At the end of the video, he escapes his pursuers in a black helicopter.

== Critical reception ==
Nia Groce of Hypebeast described the track as "braggadocious" and said NBA YoungBoy and Lil Baby's musical offering gives a taste of the action and high energy to come from F9.

== Charts ==
Chart (2020)	Peak position
US Billboard Hot 100	94
US Hot R&B/Hip-Hop Songs (Billboard)	43

== Certifications ==
Region	Certification	Certified units/sales
United States (RIAA)	Gold	500,000^{‡}
^{‡} Sales+streaming figures based on certification alone.
