= Drowning (A Boogie wit da Hoodie song) =

Single by A Boogie wit da Hoodie featuring Kodak Black

from the album The Bigger Artist
- Released: March 9, 2017
- Recorded: 2017
- Genre: Trap
- Length: 3:29
- Label: Highbridge; Atlantic
- Songwriters: Artist Dubose; Dieuson Octave; Jahaan Sweet; Ray Nelson
- Producers: Sweet; Quasi

A Boogie wit da Hoodie singles chronology
"My Shit" (2016)	"Drowning" (2017)	"Horses" (2017)

Kodak Black singles chronology
"Tunnel Vision" (2017)	"Drowning" (2017)	"Horses" (2017)

Music video
- "Drowning" on YouTube

"Drowning" (also known as "Drowning (Water)" or simply "Water") is a song by American rapper A Boogie wit da Hoodie featuring fellow American rapper Kodak Black, released on March 10, 2017, by Highbridge and Atlantic Records s the lead single from A Boogie's debut studio album, The Bigger Artist (2017). Written alongside producers Jahaan Sweet and Quasi, it peaked at number 38 on the Billboard Hot 100.

== Commercial performance ==
Drowning debuted at number 94 on the US Billboard Hot 100 on the week of April 22, 2017 and has peaked at number 38 on the chart. The song spent 21 weeks on the charts before it dropped out on the week of September 16, 2017. It was A Boogie's highest-charting single and first top 40 single and Kodak Black's second Top 40 single. On July 27, 2017, the single was certified platinum by the Recording Industry Association of America (RIAA) for combined sales and streaming equivalent units of over a million units in the United States. As of June 2024, Drowning is certified Diamond by RIAA.

== Music video ==
The song's accompanying music video premiered on October 4, 2017, on A Boogie's YouTube account. The music video currently has 93 million views as of October 2026, while the audio video has 237 million views.

In the start of the video, a muffled audio clip of a news report is heard as the melodic piano arrangement of the song begins. A grand piano and a chain that reads "A Boogie" floats in the ocean before the rapper appears onscreen to deliver the chorus. He sings underwater as all his possessions, from his watch to stacks of money swim around him. Boogie is later accompanied underwater by two mermaids before footage of the actual heist gets spliced in the middle of the visual. Kodak Black's verse is replaced by a clip of A Boogie and his counterpart preparing for their robbery. As the robbery takes place, A Boogie's song "If I Gotta Go" plays in the background. The clip cuts to footage of the high-speed chase and then returns to A Boogie wit da Hoodie's underwater performance.

== Sequel ==
On December 6, 2022, A Boogie and Kodak would release "Water (Drowning Pt. 2)" on A Boogie's fourth studio album, Me vs. Myself. It was released on A Boogie's 27th birthday. It would go on to peak at 97 on the Billboard Hot 100.

== Charts ==
=== Weekly charts ===
Chart (2017)	Peak position
Canada Hot 100 (Billboard)	53
US Billboard Hot 100	38
US Hot R&B/Hip-Hop Songs (Billboard)	15
US Rhythmic Airplay (Billboard)	28

=== Year-end charts ===
Chart (2017)	Position
US Billboard Hot 100	81
US Hot R&B/Hip-Hop Songs (Billboard)	35

== Certifications ==
Region	Certification	Certified units/sales
Austria (IFPI Austria)	Gold	15,000^{‡}
Canada (Music Canada)	8× Platinum	640,000^{‡}
Denmark (IFPI Danmark)	Gold	45,000^{‡}
France (SNEP)	Gold	100,000^{‡}
New Zealand (RMNZ)	2× Platinum	60,000^{‡}
Poland (ZPAV)	Gold	25,000^{‡}
Portugal (AFP)	Gold	5,000^{‡}
United Kingdom (BPI)	Gold	400,000^{‡}
United States (RIAA)	Diamond	10,000,000^{‡}
^{‡} Sales+streaming figures based on certification alone.
