= Star Trek: Insurrection (soundtrack) =

1998 film score by Jerry Goldsmith

Film score by Jerry Goldsmith
- Released: December 22, 1998
- Recorded: October 19–23, 1998
- Studios: Paramount Scoring Stage, Paramount Pictures Studios, Hollywood, Los Angeles
- Genre: Film score
- Length: 42:49
- Label: GNP Crescendo
- Producer: Jerry Goldsmith

Jerry Goldsmith chronology
Mulan (1998)	Star Trek: Insurrection (1998)	The Mummy (1999)

Star Trek: Insurrection is the musical score for the 1998 science fiction film of the same name. It is the fourth musical score for a Star Trek film composed and conducted by Jerry Goldsmith and performed by the Hollywood Studio Symphony, following The Motion Picture (1979), The Final Frontier (1989) and First Contact (1996). Insurrection is directed by Jonathan Frakes, based on the television series Star Trek: The Next Generation and is the ninth Star Trek film overall. The album was released through GNP Crescendo Records on December 22, 1998.

== Composition and recording ==
Goldsmith continued using the march and Klingon themes written for The Motion Picture with new themes and variations. As with the predecessors, the main title opens with Alexander Courage's Star Trek: The Original Series fanfare, which introduces a six-note motif used in many of the film's action sequences. The Ba'ku are scored with a pastoral theme with the inclusion of repetitive harps, string sections and a woodwind solo, and the Ba'ku's ability to slow time was accompanied with a variation of this music.

Quick bursts of brass music accompanied the starship sequences, while scenes in which observers watching the Ba'ku were underscored with a spy theme which resembled his conspiracy theme from Capricorn One. The theme which uses piano, timpani percussions and brass, builds throughout the scene until it is interrupted by the action theme as Data opens fire. Goldsmith did not write a motif for the Son'a, but scored the action sequence without designating the Son'a as an antagonist, suggesting the film's revelation that the Son'a and Ba'ku are related. The film's climax is scored with the action theme, which is balanced with "sense of wonder" music similar to cues from The Motion Picture.

The score was recorded at the Paramount Scoring Stage in Paramount Pictures Studios at Hollywood, Los Angeles during October 19–23, 1998.

== Track listing ==
No.	Title	Length
1.	"Ba'ku Village"	6:52
2.	"In Custody"	1:14
3.	"Children's Story"	1:47
4.	"Not Functioning"	1:45
5.	"New Sight"	5:44
6.	"The Drones Attack"	4:10
7.	"The Riker Maneuver"	3:09
8.	"The Same Race"	1:16
9.	"No Threat"	4:12
10.	"The Healing Process"	7:15
11.	"End Credits"	5:25
Total length:		42:49

== Complete score ==
Star Trek: Insurrection (Complete Score)

Film score by Jerry Goldsmith
- Released: August 6, 2013
- Genre: Film score
- Length: 79:05
- Label: GNP Crescendo
- Producer: Jerry Goldsmith

In 2013, GNP Crescendo Records re-released the soundtrack for the film as an expanded collector's edition [GNPD 8082], featuring previously unreleased tracks by Goldsmith plus four bonus tracks.

=== Track listing ===
No.	Title	Length
1.	"Ba'ku Village"	6:53
2.	"Out of Orbit / Take Us In"	1:44
3.	"Come Out"	2:34
4.	"In Custody"	1:14
5.	"Warp Capability / The Planet / Children's Story"	2:33
6.	"The Holodeck"	4:35
7.	"How Old Are You / New Sight"	6:14
8.	"Lost Ship / Prepare the Ship"	2:39
9.	"As Long as We Can"	1:40
10.	"Not Functioning / Send Your Ships"	2:55
11.	"Growing Up / Wild Flowers / Photon Torpedo"	2:55
12.	"The Drones Attack"	4:15
13.	"The Riker Maneuver"	3:15
14.	"Stay With Me"	1:48
15.	"The Same Race"	2:50
16.	"The Collector"	1:10
17.	"No Threat"	4:18
18.	"Tractor Beam"	0:38
19.	"The Healing Process" (revised)	5:04
20.	"The Healing Process" (original version)	7:17
21.	"End Credits"	5:30
22.	"Ba'ku Village" (alternate ending)	3:53
23.	"The Holodeck" (alternate opening)	1:12
24.	"Growing Up" (alternate)	1:21
25.	"Tractor Beam" (alternate)	0:38
Total length:		79:05

== Reception ==
Christian Clemmensen of Filmtracks wrote "the crystal clear sound quality is the ultimate selling point, allowing you to hear the strengths of Goldsmith's last solid "Star Trek" score down to every last, wall-rattling detail." Craig Lysy of Movie Music UK wrote "Goldsmith demonstrates mastery of his craft by expertly attenuating his themes and music to support the film's imagery and narrative." Steven McDonald of AllMusic wrote "while Goldsmith doesn't turn in a disappointment here, this is overall a relatively minor score for him."

== Personnel credits ==
Credits adapted from liner notes

- Music composed and produced by – Jerry Goldsmith
- Engineer – Dominic Gonzales, Norman Dlugatch, Paul Wertheimer
- Programming – Nick Vidar
- Assemblage – Mike Matessino
- Recording and mixing – Bruce Botnick
- Mastering – Bruce Botnick, Mike Matessino
- Music editor – Bruce Botnick, Ken Hall
- Transfers – John Davis
- Musical assistance – Lois Carruth
- Production manager – Frank K. DeWald, Jeff Eldridge, Neil S. Bulk
- Executive producer – Neil Norman, Mark Banning
- Soundtrack co-ordinator – Kim Seiniger, Mary Jo Braun

Orchestra

- Orchestra – The Hollywood Studio Symphony
- Orchestra conductor and leader – Jerry Goldsmith
- Orchestration – Alexander Courage, Evan N. Vidar, Vince Bartold
- Contractor – Sandy DeCrescent
- Music preparation – JoAnn Kane Music Service

Instruments

- Bass – Arni Egilsson, Bruce Morgenthaler, Charles Domanico, Donald V. Ferrone, Drew D. Dembowski, Nico C. Abondolo, Oscar Hidalgo, Richard Feves, Steve Edelman, Susan Ranney
- Bassoon – Charles Coker, Kenneth Munday, Michael R. O'Donovan
- Cello – J. Antony Cooke, Christine Ermacoff, Dane Little, David Low, David Speltz, Dennis Karmazyn, Douglas Davis, Kevan M. Torfeh, Marie Fera, Matthew Cooker, Nadine Hall, Paul Cohen, Paula Hochhalter, Sebastian Toettcher, Steve Erdody, Steve Richards, Timothy Landauer, Todd Hemmenway
- Clarinet – Dominick Fera, James M. Kanter
- Flute – Louise M. DiTullio, Sheridon Stokes
- French horn – Brian D. A. O'Connor, David A. Duke, James W. Thatcher, John A. Reynolds, Kurt Snyder, Phillip E. Yao, Richard Todd, Steven Becknell, Todd Miller, Yvonne S. Moriarty
- Harp – Katie Kirkpatrick
- Keyboards – Michael A. Lang, Ralph Grierson
- Oboe – Earle D. Dumler, John Ellis, Phillip Ayling
- Percussion – Alan Estes, Emil Radocchia, Gary Coleman, Larry Bunker, Steven Schaeffer
- Synthesizer – Evan N. Vidar
- Trombone – Richard Nash, Lloyd E. Ulyate, Phillip Teele
- Trumpet – Malcolm McNab, Rick Baptist, Timothy G. Morrison, Warren H. Luening
- Tuba – John T. Johnson
- Viola – Carolyn Riley, Carrie Holzman-Little, Cassandra Richburg, Dan Neufeld, Denyse N. Buffum, Jennie Hansen, Keith Greene, Marlow Fisher, Michael Ramos, Mihail Zinovyev, Pamela Goldsmith, Patricia Johnson, Phillip Levy, Rick Gerding, Roland Kato, Ron Strauss, Simon Oswell, Valerie D. Dimond
- Violin – Amy Hershberger, Anatoly Rosinsky, Armen Garabedian, Berj Garabedian, Bonnie Douglas, Bruce Dukov, Claudia Parducci, Clayton Haslop, David Ewart, Dimitrie Leivici, Endre Granat, Eun-Mee Ahn, Franklyn D'Antonio, Galina Golovin, Haim Shtrum, Isabella Lippi, Jacqueline Brand, Janet Lakatos, Jennifer Walton, Julie Ann Gigante, Karen Elaine, Karen Jones, Kathleen Lenski, Kenneth Yerke, Liane Mautner, Lisa M. Johnson, Mario De Leon, Michael Nowak, Miran Kojian, Miwako Watanabe, Patricia Aiken, Paul C. Shure, Polly Sweeney, Rafael Rishik, Rene M. Mandel, Richard L. Altenbach, Richard Leshin, Robert Brosseau, Robin Olson, Roger Haines, Roger Wilkie, Sara Parkins, Sheldon Sanov, Sid Page, Susan Marie Jensen, Tamara Hatwan, Victoria Miskolczy

== Accolades ==
Year	Award	Category	Result	Ref.
1998	International Film Music Critics Association	Best Original Score for a Fantasy/Science Fiction/Horror Film	Won	

== Bibliography ==
- Bond, Jeff (1999). The Music of Star Trek. Los Angeles: Lone Eagle Publishing Company. ISBN 1-58065-012-0.
