= John Wick: Chapter 3 – Parabellum (soundtrack) =

John Wick: Chapter 3 – Parabellum (Original Motion Picture Soundtrack)

Film score by Tyler Bates and Joel J. Richard
- Released: May 17, 2019
- Genres: Rock; pop; electronic
- Length: 65:36
- Label: Varèse Sarabande
- Producers: Tyler Bates; Joel J. Richard

Tyler Bates chronology
The Spy Who Dumped Me (2018)	John Wick: Chapter 3 – Parabellum (2019)	Hobbs & Shaw (2019)

Joel J. Richard chronology
Triple Threat (2019)	John Wick: Chapter 3 – Parabellum (2019)	Books of Blood (2020)

Singles from John Wick: Chapter 3 – Parabellum (Original Motion Picture Soundtrack)
- 1. "Bullet Holes" Released: May 17, 2019

John Wick: Chapter 3 – Parabellum (Original Motion Picture Soundtrack) is the soundtrack album to the 2019 film John Wick: Chapter 3 – Parabellum, the third instalment in the John Wick franchise, starring Keanu Reeves as the eponymous character, and is directed by Chad Stahelski, who also directed the previous instalments. Tyler Bates and Joel J. Richard, also returned as the composer for the series. The album, consisted most of Bates and Richard's score, while a song "Dance of the Two Wolves" performed by Julia Aks is also in the soundtrack. Varèse Sarabande released the soundtrack album digitally on May 17, 2019, coinciding the film's release, and physically on June 7, 2019. The two-disc vinyl edition of the soundtrack were released into a trilogy, along with the scores from previous instalments on November 15.

== Critical reception ==
Zanobard Reviews gave the album a score of eight out of ten, saying "Tyler Bates' score to John Wick: Chapter 3 – Parabellum (what a title by the way) is pretty great. It continues in the same musical vein as the first two scores, using that unique mixture of electronics and a rather gloomy tone to both emphasize the dark character of Wick and get across the particularly dramatic nature of the films as well. This third entry also adds some new and rather interesting thematic ideas to the world of John Wick and then expertly mixes them with the original themes, and this combined with some near breathtaking action setpieces not only makes Parabellum a highly enjoyable album, but also the best John Wick score so far." Film Music Central called the score as "edgy, it's fast-paced, but it also slows down when necessary, and it fits the film's world perfectly" and continued "we like how Bates can insert slow moments out of nowhere, it's easy to forget about them since most of the film is devoted to fights, but the slow moments are just as beautiful".

== Track listing ==
No.	Title	Length
1.	"Parabellum (Opening Titles)"	0:48
2.	"Tick Tock Mr. Wick"	3:11
3.	"Taxi Ride"	2:47
4.	"Excomunicado"	1:25
5.	"Rain Chase"	1:40
6.	"Antique Gun Assembly"	1:25
7.	"J.W. Horse Whisperer"	2:05
8.	"Dance of the Two Wolves" (performed by Julia Aks)	1:47
9.	"The Adjudicator"	2:54
10.	"Wick in Morocco"	2:07
11.	"Kill What You Love"	2:20
12.	"Continental Morocco"	3:38
13.	"Desert Walk"	2:10
14.	"Elder Tent Offering"	4:55
15.	"He Shot My Dog"	1:20
16.	"Grand Central Station"	2:18
17.	"Cycle Samurais"	4:06
18.	"The Glass House"	4:37
19.	"Deconsecrated"	3:18
20.	"Winter at the Continental"	2:50
21.	"Shotgun Hot Tub"	3:22
22.	"Glass House Fight"	4:12
23.	"Zero vs. Wick"	4:44
24.	"Really Pissed Off (End Credits)"	1:37
Total length:		65:36

== Additional music ==
Unlike the soundtracks for previous instalments, the soundtrack for Chapter 3 – Parabellum had featured only one song titled "Dance of the Two Wolves" performed by Julia Aks. "Bullet Holes", a song performed by the English band Bush, is only released as a promotional single and not included in the soundtrack. Other non-album singles, that featured in the film, includes: "Take You Back" by Frank Stallone, "Sad Waltz" by Anna Drubich, "Pas de Deux" (The Prince and the Sugar Plum Fairy) from The Nutcracker, "Grand Allegro" by Søren Bebe, "Ninja Re Bang Bang" by Yasutaka Nakata, "Yoga Dreampiano" by Giordana Trivellato, "Winter" (from The Four Seasons) by Antonio Vivaldi, "Fra Holbergs Tid: 11. Sarabande" by Edvard Grieg.

== Personnel ==
Credits adapted from AllMusic.

- All music composed and produced by: Tyler Bates, Joel J. Richard
- Additional music: Lorena Perez Batista, Joanne Higginbottom
- Mixing: Wolfgang Matthes, Joel J. Richard
- Mastering: Patricia Sullivan
- Percussion: Greg Ellis
- Drums: Gil Sharone
- Music editing: Richard Henderson
- Music supervisor: Kevin Edelman
- Score preparation: Matias Ambrogi-Torbes
- Creative services co-ordinator: Cutting Edge
- Executive producer: Kevin Edelman, Cary E. Mansfield
- Music executive: Nikki Triplett
