= Road to Fast 9 =

2020 mixtape by various artists

Mixtape by Various artists
- Released: July 31, 2020
- Length: 35:17
- Labels: Atlantic; APG
- Producers: Drum Dummie; Chaz Jackson; Orlando Tha Great; Frank Dukes; WondaGurl; Menoh Beats; Fabio Aguilar; Keanu Torres; Pliznaya; Nicael; Jazz; Tito Flow; Outtatown; Simon Kempner; The Atomix; Poly Boy; Andrew Jones; Tae Hong Kim; Extendo Beatz; Gotdamnitdupri

Singles from Road to Fast 9
- 1. "One Shot" Released: June 18, 2020; 2. "Convertible Burt" Released: July 3, 2020; 3. "Red & Yellow" Released: July 9, 2020; 4. "How 2 Ride" Released: July 16, 2020; 5. "No Hay Amor" Released: July 23, 2020; 6. "Ruff Rydas" Released: July 23, 2020; 7. "Clap" Released: July 30, 2020; 8. "Too Fast" Released: July 31, 2020

Road to Fast 9 is a commercial mixtape released on July 31, 2020. The mixtape featured 13 tracks performed by various rap and hip-hop artists to promote the 2021 action film F9, the ninth installment in the Fast & Furious franchise. The featuring artists including YoungBoy Never Broke Again, Lil Baby, Kevin Gates and Tory Lanez, Don Toliver, Lil Skies, Wiz Khalifa, Toosii, Tyga, Mozzy, NLE Choppa, Arcángel amongst others.

== Singles ==
On June 19, 2020, the track "One Shot" performed by YoungBoy Never Broke Again and Lil Baby was released as the first track from the album. Later, the second single "Convertible Burt" by Kevin Gates and Tory Lanez was released on July 3. The third single "Red & Yellow" performed by Lil Skies was released on July 9, and the fourth single "How 2 Ride" performed by KingmostWanted was released July 16. The fifth and sixth singles, "No Hay Amor" and "Ruff Rydas" were released on July 23. The tracks were performed by Arcángel and NLE Choppa. The seventh track, "Clap" performed by Don Toliver was released on July 30, and the eighth track "Too Fast" was released on July 31, coinciding with the mixtape release.

== Track listing ==
No.	Title	Writer(s)	Producer(s)	Length
1.	"One Shot" (YoungBoy Never Broke Again featuring Lil Baby)	Dominique Jones; Kentrell Gaulden; Tevin Revell	Drum Dummie	3:16
2.	"Convertible Burt" (Kevin Gates and Tory Lanez)	Aidan Cullen; Basil Von Steitencron; Chaz Jackson; Daystar Peterson; Marcellus Kevin Gates; Orlando Williamson	Jackson; Orlando Tha Great	2:55
3.	"Clap" (Don Toliver)	Adam Feeney; Caleb Toliver; Ebony Naomi Oshunrinde; Mike Dean	Frank Dukes; WondaGurl	2:20
4.	"Red & Yellow" (Lil Skies)	Amin Elamin; Kimetrius Foose	Menoh Beats	3:12
5.	"Flight to China" (Wiz Khalifa featuring Toosii)	Cameron Thomaz; Fabio Aguilar; Keanu Torres; Leon Flowers Jr.; Naujour Grainger	Aguilar; Torres; Pliznaya	2:50
6.	"No Hay Amor" (Arcángel)	Augustin Santos; Jose Nicael Arroyo Hernandez	Nicael	3:36
7.	"Solo Llama" (Eladio Carrión)	Eladio Carrión Morales; Gilbert Rodriguez Marte; Roberto Rafael Tineo Pepin	Jazz; Tito Flow	2:24
8.	"Ruff Rydas" (NLE Choppa)	Bryson Potts; Tobias Dekker	Outtatown	2:49
9.	"Family" (NoCap featuring Quando Rondo)	Carlos Young; Kobe Crawford; Simon Kempner; Ta'Von Washington; Tyquain Bowman	Kempner; The Atomix	2:16
10.	"How 2 Ride" (KINGMOSTWANTED)	Iosua Tima; Kyle King	Poly Boy	2:09
11.	"Too Fast" (Tyga featuring Mozzy)	Micheal Stevenson; Regis Dupris Bell Jr.; Spencer Anderson; Timothy Patterson	Extendo Beatz; Gotdamnitdupri	2:22
12.	"No Bailes Sola" (Jowell & Randy)	Joel Muñoz; Jose Nicael Arroyo Hernandez; Linkon; Randy Ortiz; Tito Flow	Nicael; Tito Flow	2:38
13.	"Phantom" (Allen Mock)	Andrew Jones; Tae Hong Kim	Jones; Kim	2:25
Total length:				35:17

== See also ==
- Fast & Furious
