= The Mummy (1999 soundtrack) =

The Mummy (Original Motion Picture Soundtrack)

Film score by Jerry Goldsmith
- Released: May 4, 1999
- Studios: AIR; Whitefield Street
- Genres: Film score, World
- Length: 57:46
- Label: Decca
- Producer: Jerry Goldsmith

Jerry Goldsmith chronology
Star Trek: Insurrection (1999)	The Mummy (Original Motion Picture Soundtrack) (1999)	The Haunting (1999)

The Mummy (Original Motion Picture Soundtrack) is the soundtrack to the 1999 film The Mummy directed by Stephen Sommers. The film score is composed by Jerry Goldsmith which utilizes traditional orchestral music and native instruments. The 15-track score album was released under the Decca Records label on May 4, 1999, while a special edition album that consisted of previously unreleased material was released through Intrada Records on July 17, 2018. The score was positively reviewed and highlighted as one of Goldsmith's best scores in his career.

== Development ==
The score for The Mummy was composed and conducted by Jerry Goldsmith, with orchestrations provided by Alexander Courage. Goldsmith had previously scored Deep Rising for Sommers. As he reached the final few years of his career, Goldsmith was coming off a number of action and adventure films in the 1990s, from multiple Star Trek films to Air Force One. Goldsmith provided The Mummy with suitably bombastic music, with the traditional European orchestra supplemented with regional instruments such as the bouzouki.

The opening of the film contains nearly all of Goldsmith's major themes for the score, with what music critic Jeff Bond calls an "Egyptian theme" reused in different configurations throughout to establish the epic settings and sense of place for Hamunaptra; a theme for Imhotep/the Mummy that is performed in an understated manner early in the film, before repeating in more forceful, brassy renditions after the Mummy has regenerated; a love theme used for both Imhotep/Anck-su-namun and Rick/Evelyn; and a heroic theme for Rick.

In addition to the extensive brass and percussion elements, the score uses sparing amounts of vocals, unusual for much of Goldsmith's work.

== Reception ==
Overall, Goldsmith's score was well received and has been regarded as one of Goldsmith's best scores in his career. AllMusic described it as a "grand, melodramatic score" which delivered the expected highlights. Other reviews positively noted the dark, percussive sound meshed well with the plot, as well as the raw power of the music. The limited but masterful use of the chorus was also lauded, and most critics found the final track on the CD to be the best overall. Thomas Glorieux in his review for Maintitles, found it to be his entertaining works released during the 1990s and a spectacular.

On the other hand, some critics found the score lacked cohesion, and that the constant heavy action lent itself to annoying repetition. Todd McCarthy's review for Variety however found that "Jerry Goldsmith's heavy, ever-present score has a deadening effect on the action, however, and has to rate as one of the worst of his long and distinguished career."

== Track listing ==
=== Standard ===
The Mummy (Original Motion Picture Soundtrack) track listing
No.	Title	Length
1.	"Imhotep"	4:20
2.	"The Sarcophagus"	2:17
3.	"Tuareg Attack"	2:23
4.	"Giza Port"	2:01
5.	"Night Boarders"	4:08
6.	"The Caravan"	2:52
7.	"Camel Race"	3:26
8.	"The Crypt"	2:26
9.	"Mumia Attack"	2:19
10.	"Discoveries"	3:41
11.	"My Favorite Plague"	3:59
12.	"Crowd Control"	3:12
13.	"Rebirth"	8:33
14.	"The Mummy"	6:19
15.	"The Sand Volcano"	5:41
Total length:		57:46

=== Special edition ===
The Mummy (Intrada Special Edition Collection) track listing – disc 1
No.	Title	Length
1.	"Imhotep"	4:15
2.	"The Sarcophagus"	2:13
3.	"The Tauregs Attack"	2:20
4.	"Closed Door"	1:22
5.	"Undiscovered Creature"	1:00
6.	"Off Balance"	0:45
7.	"A Key in the Hand"	0:37
8.	"The Hanging"	0:56
9.	"Giza Port" (alternate)	1:57
10.	"Night Boarders"	4:03
11.	"The Caravan"	2:41
12.	"Camel Race"	3:22
13.	"The Prep Room"	2:39
14.	"The Mummy Sarcophagus"	2:23
15.	"Mumia Attack"	2:21
16.	"A Librarian"	1:03
17.	"Discoveries"	3:36
18.	"The Plagues"	0:51
19.	"The Locusts" (alternate)	5:01
20.	"Never Stop"	2:29
21.	"Finish the Job"	1:54
22.	"Regeneration"	0:29
23.	"Alley Attack"	0:24
24.	"The Flies"	0:51
25.	"Sleeping Evy"	1:39
26.	"My Favorite Plague" (alternate)	3:59
27.	"Crowd Control"	3:09
28.	"Airplane Ride"	0:51
29.	"Sand Storm"	2:31
30.	"Desert Burial"	1:07
31.	"Rebirth"	8:41
32.	"The Mummy Attack"	6:15
Total length:		77:44

The Mummy (Intrada Special Edition Collection) track listing – disc 2
No.	Title	Length
1.	"Escape from the Tomb"	1:52
2.	"The Sand Volcano"	2:18
3.	"End Credits"	8:01
4.	"The Locusts" (original)	4:51
5.	"My Favorite Plague" (original)	3:59
6.	"Imhotep"	4:15
7.	"The Sarcophagus"	2:13
8.	"Taureg Attack"	2:20
9.	"Giza Port"	1:57
10.	"Night Boarders"	4:03
11.	"The Caravan"	2:48
12.	"Camel Race"	3:22
13.	"The Crypt"	2:23
14.	"Mumia Attack"	2:15
15.	"Discoveries"	3:36
16.	"My Favorite Plague"	3:54
17.	"Crowd Control"	3:09
18.	"Rebirth"	8:28
19.	"The Mummy"	6:15
20.	"The Sand Volcano"	5:38
Total length:		77:37

== Personnel ==
Credits adapted from liner notes.

- Music composer, conductor, producer – Jerry Goldsmith
- Orchestrator – Alexander Courage
- Choir – Metro Voices
- Contractor – Isobel Griffiths
- Programming – Nick Vidar
- Recording – Mike Ross-Trevor
- Mixing and mastering – Bruce Botnick
- Music editor – Ken Hall, Bruce Botnick
- Musical assistance – Lois Carruth
- Executive producer – Jim Jacks, Sean Daniel, Stephen Sommers
- Music co-ordinator – Kristen Turner, Randy Dry, Trevon Kezios
- Copyist – Vic Fraser

== Accolades ==
Accolades for
Award	Category	Recipient	Result	Ref.
BMI Film & TV Awards	BMI Film Music Award	Jerry Goldsmith	Won	
Saturn Awards	Best Music	Jerry Goldsmith	Nominated	
