= Go Off (Lil Uzi Vert, Quavo and Travis Scott song) =

Single by Lil Uzi Vert, Quavo and Travis Scott

Single by Lil Uzi Vert, Quavo and Travis Scott

from the album The Fate of the Furious: The Album
- Released: March 2, 2017
- Genre: Trap
- Length: 3:37
- Label: APG; Atlantic; UMG
- Songwriters: Symere Woods; Quavious Marshall; Jacques Webster II; Shane Lindstrom; Breyan Isaac; Christopher Featherstone; Justin Featherstone; William Featherstone; Matthew Featherstone
- Producers: The Featherstones; Murda Beatz; Isaac

Lil Uzi Vert singles chronology
"Bad and Boujee" (2016)	"Go Off" (2017)	"Lookin" (2017)

Quavo singles chronology
"Want Her" (2017)	"Go Off" (2017)	"I'm the One" (2017)

Travis Scott singles chronology
"Beibs in the Trap" (2016)	"Go Off" (2017)	"Love Galore" (2017)

Music video
- "Go Off" on YouTube

"Go Off" is a song by American rappers Lil Uzi Vert, Quavo, and Travis Scott. It was released on March 2, 2017 as the lead single from the soundtrack for the 2017 film The Fate of the Furious. The song was produced by The Featherstones, Murda Beatz and Breyan Isaac.

== Music video ==
The music video was released alongside the single. It features footage from The Fate of the Furious and shows Lil Uzi Vert, Quavo and Travis Scott performing while surrounded by the action, with cars racing and doing donuts. Two of Dominic Toretto's cars, his 1971 Plymouth GTX from the New York chase and his 1968 Dodge Ice Charger from the final battle near the end of the movie, also appear in the video.. The other two Migos members Offset and Takeoff also have cameos in the video.

== Charts ==
Chart (2017)	Peak position
France (SNEP)	124
US Bubbling Under Hot 100 (Billboard)	7
US Hot R&B/Hip-Hop Songs (Billboard)	39

== Certifications ==
Region	Certification	Certified units/sales
United States (RIAA)	Platinum	1,000,000^{‡}
^{‡} Sales+streaming figures based on certification alone.
