= The Fate of the Furious (soundtrack) =

2017 soundtrack album by various artists

The Fate of the Furious: The Album

Soundtrack album by various artists
- Released: April 14, 2017
- Genres: Hip-hop; EDM; Latin pop
- Length: 49:50
- Labels: APG; Atlantic
- Producers: 30 Roc; Axident; Bassnectar; Ben Billions; Breyan Isaac; Danny Majic; DJ Chose; DJ Frank E; DJ Ricky Luna; DJ Swift; Evigan; The Featherstones; Frank Dukes; Gladius; Infamous; Invincible Beats; Mike Molina; Nelson Kyle; Johnny Yukon; Louis Bell; Murda Beatz; Pip Kembo; Post Malone; Sermstyle; Sevn Thomas; T-Collar; Wahin

Singles from The Fate of the Furious: The Album
- 1. "Go Off" Released: March 2, 2017; 2. "Hey Ma" Released: March 10, 2017; 3. "Good Life" Released: March 17, 2017; 4. "Gang Up" Released: March 24, 2017; 5. "Horses" Released: March 30, 2017; 6. "Candy Paint" Released: October 20, 2017

The Fate of the Furious: The Album also known as Fast & Furious 8: The Album on the digital version out of the United States is the soundtrack album to The Fate of the Furious. It was released on April 14, 2017, by Artist Partner Group and Atlantic Records, in conjunction of the film's US theatrical release. It was promoted by six singles: "Go Off", "Hey Ma", "Good Life", "Gang Up", "Horses", and "Candy Paint".

== Singles ==
The first single of the album, "Go Off", was released on March 2, 2017. The song is performed by Lil Uzi Vert, Quavo and Travis Scott. The second single, "Hey Ma", by Pitbull and J Balvin featuring Camila Cabello, was released on March 10. "Good Life" by G-Eazy and Kehlani was released as the third single on March 17. "Gang Up" by Young Thug, 2 Chainz, Wiz Khalifa and PnB Rock was released as the fourth single on March 24. The fifth single, "Horses", by PnB Rock, Kodak Black and A Boogie wit da Hoodie, was released on March 30. The sixth single, "Candy Paint", performed by Post Malone, was released on October 20.

== Track listing ==
The Fate of the Furious track listing
No.	Title	Writer(s)	Producer(s)	Length
1.	"Gang Up" (Young Thug, 2 Chainz, Wiz Khalifa and PnB Rock)	Jeffery Williams; Tauheed Epps; Cameron Thomaz; Rakim Allen; Vincent Watson; Alexander Izquierdo; Nelson Kyle; Mike Molina; Johnny Mitchell	Invincible; The Agency	3:51
2.	"Go Off" (Lil Uzi Vert, Quavo and Travis Scott)	Symere Woods; Quavious Marshall; Jacques Webster; Shane Lindstrom; Breyan Isaac; Christopher Featherstone; Justin Featherstone; William Featherstone; Matthew Featherstone	The Featherstones; Murda Beatz; Isaac	3:37
3.	"Good Life" (G-Eazy and Kehlani)	Gerald Gillum; Kehlani Parrish; Benjamin Diehl; Marco Rodriguez Diaz; Jason Evigan; Holly Hafermann; Justin Franks; Danny Majic; Andrew Thomas; Moses Davis; Steven Marsden; Vanessa Carlton; D. Staggs Sr; Dean Mundy	DJ Frank E; Ben Billions; Infamous; Evigan; Danny Majic	3:45
4.	"Horses" (PnB Rock, Kodak Black and A Boogie wit da Hoodie)	Allen; Dieuson Octave; Artist Dubose; Norman Payne	DJ Chose	4:09
5.	"Seize the Block" (Migos)	Marshall; Kirshnik Ball; Kiari Cephus; Samuel Gloade; Jerel Nance	30 Roc	3:59
6.	"Murder (Remix)" (YoungBoy Never Broke Again featuring 21 Savage)	Kentrell Gaulden; Shayaa Joseph; Damion Williams	DJ Swift	3:20
7.	"Speakerbox (F8 Remix)" (Bassnectar featuring Ohana Bam and Lafa Taylor)	Lorin Ashton; May Sian Lim; Brenton Smith; Lafayette Taylor	Bassnectar	3:08
8.	"Candy Paint" (Post Malone)	Austin Post; Louis Bell	Post Malone; Bell	3:49
9.	"911" (Kevin Gates)	Kevin Gilyard; Rupert Thomas Jr.; Adam Feeney; Maxwell Ramsey; Shannon Sanders; Brittany Chi Coney; Denisia Andrews; Willie Baker; India Arie Simpson	Sevn Thomas; Frank Dukes; Gian Stone	3:12
10.	"Mamacita" (Lil Yachty featuring Rico Nasty)	Miles McCollum; Johnny Mitchell; Evigan; Watson; Glenda Proby; Jocelyn Donald	Invincible	3:22
11.	"Don't Get Much Better" (Jeremih, Ty Dolla Sign and Sage the Gemini)	Jeremih Felton; Tyrone Griffin; Dominic Woods; Eric Frederic; Andreas Schuller; James Wong; Proby; Mitchell; Floyd Bentley; Michael Holmes; Sean Douglas; Akeel Henry; Christian Ward	Ricky Reed; Axident; Gladius; DZ	4:25
12.	"Hey Ma (Spanish Version)" (Pitbull and J Balvin featuring Camila Cabello)	Armando Christian Perez; Jose Balvin; Cabello; Jamie Sanderson; Tinashe Sibanda; Philip Kembo; Andres Davis Restrepo; Rosina Russell; Mitchell; Johnny Yukon	Sermstyle; Al Burna; T-Collar; Pip Kembo; Rolo; Yukon	3:14
13.	"La Habana" (Pinto "Wahin" and DJ Ricky Luna featuring El Taiger)	José Colorado; Ricky Luna; Jose Zaldivar	DJ Ricky Luna; Wahin	2:44
14.	"Hey Ma" (J Balvin and Pitbull featuring Camila Cabello)	Perez; Balvin; Cabello; Sanderson; Sibanda; Kembo; Russell; Mitchell; Restrepo; Yukon	Sermstyle; T-Collar; Kembo; Yukon	3:15
Total length:				49:50

== Charts ==
=== Weekly charts ===
Chart (2017–2018)	Peak position
Australian Albums (ARIA)	13
Austrian Albums (Ö3 Austria)	7
Belgian Albums (Ultratop Flanders)	16
Belgian Albums (Ultratop Wallonia)	29
Canadian Albums (Billboard)	8
Czech Albums (ČNS IFPI)	16
Dutch Albums (Album Top 100)	37
Finnish Albums (Suomen virallinen lista)	9
French Albums (SNEP)	30
German Albums (Offizielle Top 100)	10
New Zealand Albums (RMNZ)	17
Spanish Albums (PROMUSICAE)	18
Swiss Albums (Schweizer Hitparade)	6
US Billboard 200	10
US Top R&B/Hip-Hop Albums (Billboard)	5
US Soundtrack Albums (Billboard)	3

=== Year-end charts ===
Chart (2017)	Position
Japanese Albums (Billboard Japan)	35
US Billboard 200	104
US Top R&B/Hip-Hop Albums (Billboard)	36
US Soundtrack Albums (Billboard)	10

Chart (2018)	Position
US Billboard 200	195
US Top R&B/Hip-Hop Albums (Billboard)	78
US Soundtrack Albums (Billboard)	11

== Certifications ==
Region	Certification	Certified units/sales
United States (RIAA)	Gold	500,000^{‡}
^{‡} Sales+streaming figures based on certification alone.

== Awards ==
- 32nd Japan Gold Disc Awards – Soundtrack Album of the Year

== The Fate of the Furious: Original Motion Picture Score ==
The Fate of the Furious: Original Motion Picture Score

Film score by Brian Tyler
- Released: April 28, 2017
- Length: 77:16
- Label: Back Lot
- Producer: Brian Tyler

Brian Tyler chronology
Power Rangers (2017)	The Fate of the Furious: Original Motion Picture Score (2017)	The Mummy (2017)

The Fate of the Furious: Original Motion Picture Score is the film score album of the 2017 action film of the same name. It was released by Back Lot Music on April 28, 2017. The score was written and composed by Brian Tyler, who also wrote and composed the musical score for the third, fourth, fifth and seventh installments.

=== Track listing ===
All music composed by Brian Tyler.

No.	Title	Length
1.	"The Fate Of The Furious"	3:36
2.	"Cipher"	2:10
3.	"Zombie Time"	6:01
4.	"Reunited"	2:45
5.	"Confluence"	1:30
6.	"Affirmation"	2:35
7.	"The Toy Shop"	1:25
8.	"Hoodwinked"	3:03
9.	"Incentive"	3:46
10.	"Harpooned"	4:28
11.	"Simple Solutions"	2:30
12.	"Asking The Question"	1:30
13.	"The Cuban Mile"	3:35
14.	"Facing The Crocodile"	3:22
15.	"Cargo Breach"	4:15
16.	"Mutual Interest"	2:00
17.	"Wrecking Ball"	3:02
18.	"Taking Control"	2:13
19.	"Consequences"	2:58
20.	"Nobody's Intel"	1:38
21.	"Outflanked"	3:44
22.	"Welcome To The Club"	2:04
23.	"Roman"	2:21
24.	"Davidaniya"	2:02
25.	"Concussion Grenade"	1:02
26.	"Rogue"	2:39
27.	"Dead In The Eye"	3:06
28.	"The Return"	1:56
Total length:		1:17:16
