= Cheryl K =

Malaysian singer-songwriter

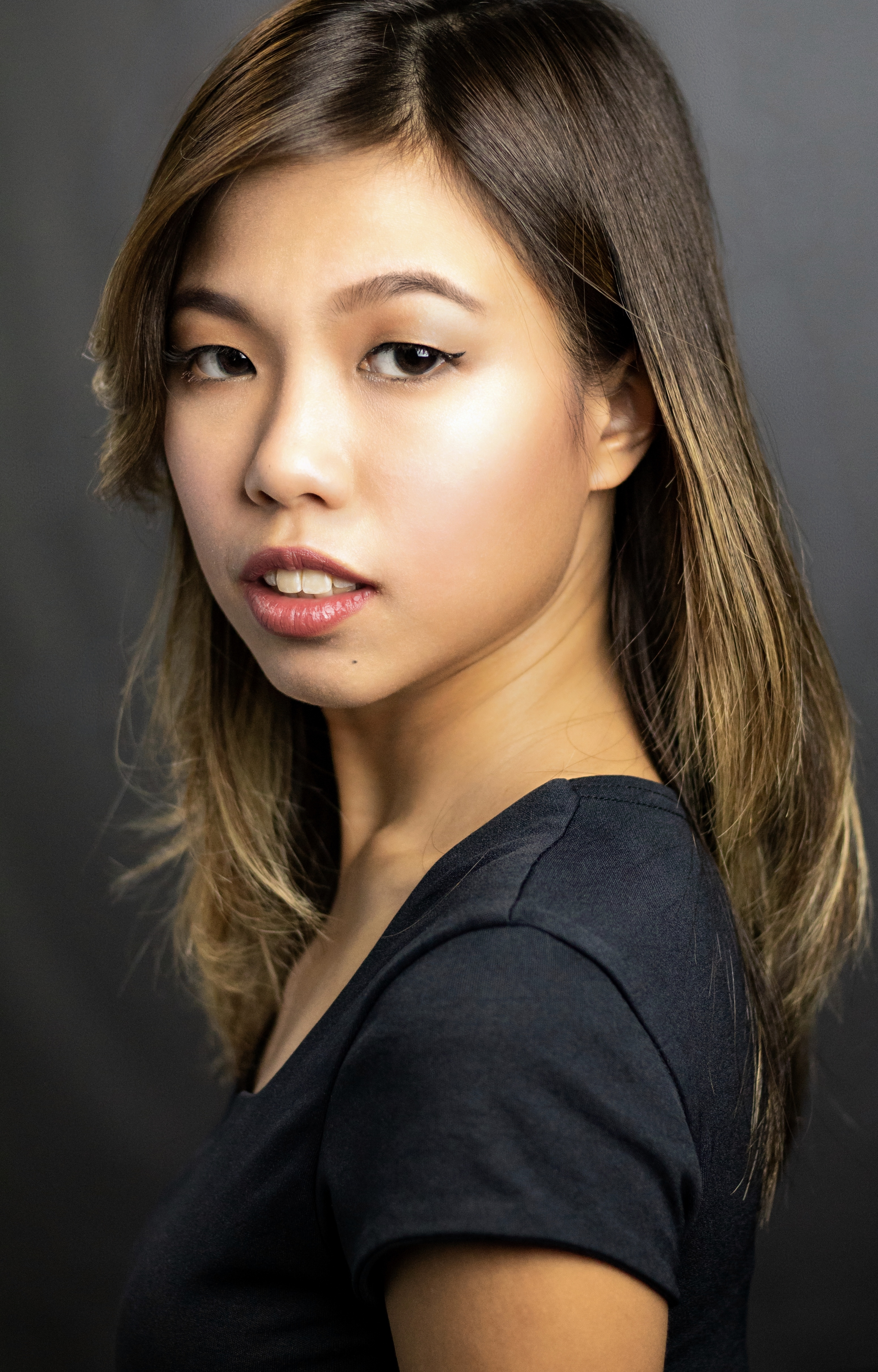
- Cheryl K in 2019
- Born: Cheryl Koh; 24 November 1995 (age 30); Kuala Lumpur, Malaysia
- Citizenship: Singaporean
- Education: University of Southern California
- Occupations: Singer; songwriter; actress
- Years active: 2010–present
- Musical career
- Genres: Pop; R&B; Soul; Ballad
- Instruments: Vocals; Piano
- Website: thisischerylk.com

Cheryl Koh, known professionally as Cheryl K (born 24 November 1995) is a Malaysia-born singer-songwriter and actress of Singaporean citizenship. She is most known for her performance on the Warner Bros. Pictures 2018 film, Crazy Rich Asians. Cheryl sings the film's opening title and ending credits song, "Money (That's What I Want)" in both English and Mandarin Chinese. The ending credits version also has Awkwafina, who stars in the film as Peik Lin, rapping on the song. Cheryl was discovered by the film's director Jon M. Chu who saw her singing a 15-second a cappella cover of Jessie J's "Mamma Knows Best" on YouTube and offered her the job.

== Early life ==
Cheryl was born on 24 November 1995 in Kuala Lumpur, Malaysia. She started singing at the age of 8.

In May 2018, she graduated with a Bachelor's in Business Administration from USC Marshall School of Business and a Music Industry minor from USC Thornton School of Music at the University of Southern California in Los Angeles, California.

== Career ==
Cheryl Koh, a talented 16-year-old singer from Shah Alam, Selangor, rose to prominence after securing first runner-up in the Twisties Superstarz singing competition. Her fortunes changed when the grand prize winner, Eddie Courtney Chan, relinquished his prize due to study commitments, allowing Cheryl to claim the top spot. This opportunity enabled her to record a single that was featured on MTV. Known for her powerful voice despite her petite stature (150 cm), Cheryl has been singing since the age of eight and also enjoys writing poems and composing songs. One of her original tracks, I Feel For You, received positive reviews when aired on Capital FM in the Klang Valley.

Cheryl represented Malaysia in the World Championships of Performing Arts (WCOPA) in Hollywood and won four Gold medals including a Hollywood Industry Award and Champion of the World Senior Division Awards. She was then invited again to perform as the opening guest artist for the competition's 23rd Annual WCOPA Grand Finale at the Terrace Theatre in Long Beach, California where it was webcast live globally.

Prior to her move to Los Angeles, Cheryl has shared the stage with other prominent Malaysian artists such as Datuk Seri Siti Nurhaliza, Jaclyn Victor, and Vince Chong.

In 2014, Cheryl was invited to perform alongside producer, composer, and 16x Grammy winner, David Foster. She also shared the stage and sang with American R&B singer-songwriter, Eric Benet and American Idol season 2 Winner, Ruben Studdard.

In 2018, Cheryl made her most notable debut singing a unique version of Barrett Strong's "Money (That's What I Want)" in both English and Mandarin in the Warner Bros. Pictures film, Crazy Rich Asians.

Cheryl has released her new single, "Here to Stay" on 23 December 2018. In an interview, she says the song is "meant to inspire others to persevere against anyone who is trying to take you down." On 19 June 2020, she released another single she wrote entitled, "who are you?".

Cheryl auditioned for the nineteenth season of American Idol, singing "Endless Love" to a panel which included original singer Lionel Richie—who sang along with her as a duet. Although the judges did not advance her to the Hollywood Round, Richie did autograph her vinyl of the 1981 record with Diana Ross.

== Discography ==
Singles

- "Here to Stay" (2018)
- "Who Are You" (2020)
- "Better" (2020)

Featured

- "Ready2Love feat. Cheryl K" by Guy Tang (2021)
