= Horses (song) =

2017 single by PnB Rock, Kodak Black and A Boogie Wit Da Hoodie

Single by PnB Rock, Kodak Black and A Boogie wit da Hoodie

from the album The Fate of the Furious: The Album
- Released: March 31, 2017
- Genre: Trap
- Length: 4:09
- Label: APG; Atlantic
- Songwriters: Rakim Allen; Dieuson Octave; Artist Dubose; Norman Payne
- Producer: DJ Chose

PnB Rock singles chronology
"Gang Up" (2017)	"Horses" (2017)	"Okay Fine" (2017)

Kodak Black singles chronology
"Drowning" (2017)	"Horses" (2017)	"Real Hitta" (2017)

A Boogie wit da Hoodie singles chronology
"Drowning" (2017)	"Horses" (2017)	"The Get Back" (2017)

"Horses" is a song by American rappers PnB Rock, Kodak Black, and A Boogie wit da Hoodie. It was released on March 31, 2017, as the fifth single from the soundtrack of the film The Fate of the Furious.

== Composition ==
The song is about the rappers driving new cars, over a "subdued, yet catchy" beat. PnB Rock sings the chorus, while Kodak Black raps about how he drives carelessly.

== Charts ==
Chart (2017)	Peak position
US Bubbling Under Hot 100 (Billboard)	9
US Bubbling Under R&B/Hip-Hop Singles (Billboard)	2

== Certifications ==
Region	Certification	Certified units/sales
New Zealand (RMNZ)	Gold	15,000^{‡}
United States (RIAA)	2× Platinum	2,000,000^{‡}
^{‡} Sales+streaming figures based on certification alone.
