= Gang Up =

2017 single by Young Thug, 2 Chainz, Wiz Khalifa and PnB Rock

Single by Young Thug, 2 Chainz, Wiz Khalifa and PnB Rock

from the album The Fate of the Furious: The Album
- Released: March 24, 2017
- Recorded: 2015
- Genre: Hip hop; trap
- Length: 3:51
- Label: Atlantic
- Songwriter(s): Jeffery Williams; Tauheed Epps; Cameron Thomaz; Rakim Allen; Vincent Watson; Alexander Izquierdo; Nelson Kyle; Mike Molina; Johnny Mitchell
- Producer(s): Invincible; The Agency

Young Thug singles chronology
"Trap Trap Trap" (2017)	"Gang Up" (2017)	"Heatstroke" (2017)

2 Chainz singles chronology
"It's a Vibe" (2017)	"Gang Up" (2017)	"4 AM" (2017)

Wiz Khalifa singles chronology
"Ain't Nothing" (2017)	"Gang Up" (2017)	"Something New" (2017)

PnB Rock singles chronology
"Everyday We Lit" (2016)	"Gang Up" (2017)	"Horses" (2017)

Music video
- "Gang Up" on YouTube

"Gang Up" is a song recorded by American rappers Young Thug, 2 Chainz, Wiz Khalifa, and PnB Rock. The track was commissioned for the soundtrack of the 2017 action film The Fate of the Furious. "Gang Up", which is a hip hop and trap song, was released on March 24, 2017, as the soundtrack's fourth single in the United States.

== Music video ==
The accompanying music video for "Gang Up" was uploaded to Young Thug's YouTube channel on April 14, 2017.

== Charts ==
Chart (2017)	Peak position
Australia (ARIA)	118
France (SNEP)	64
Switzerland (Schweizer Hitparade)	72
US Bubbling Under Hot 100 (Billboard)	13
US Bubbling Under R&B/Hip-Hop Singles (Billboard)	4

== Certifications ==
Region	Certification	Certified units/sales
United States (RIAA)	Gold	500,000^{‡}
^{‡} Sales+streaming figures based on certification alone.
