= Hey Ma (Pitbull and J Balvin song) =

Single by Pitbull and J Balvin featuring Camila Cabello

from the album The Fate of the Furious: The Album
- Released: March 10, 2017
- Studio: A Studios (West Hollywood, California); Circle House Studios (Miami, Florida); Artcrime Studios (La Romana, Dominican Republic); Orange Coyote Studios (Studio City, California)
- Length: 3:14
- Label: Artist Partner; Atlantic
- Songwriters: Pitbull; J Balvin; Camila Cabello
- Producers: Sermstyle; T-Collar; Pip Kembo; Ryan Gladieux (voc.); Jean Rodríguez (voc.); Daniel Flores (voc.); Al Burna (voc.); Matt Beckley (voc.)

Pitbull singles chronology
"Better On Me" (2017)	"Hey Ma" (2017)	"All of the Girls" (2017)

J Balvin singles chronology
"Si Tu Novio Te Deja Sola" (2017)	"Hey Ma" (2017)	"Bonita" (2017)

Camila Cabello singles chronology
"Love Incredible" (2017)	"Hey Ma" (2017)	"Crying in the Club" (2017)

Music video
- "Hey Ma" (Spanish Version) on YouTube "Hey Ma" (English Version) on YouTube

"Hey Ma" is a song by American rapper and singer Pitbull and Colombian singer J Balvin, featuring vocals from American singer Camila Cabello, taken from The Fate of the Furious soundtrack (2017). It was co-written by the artists, while co-produced by Sermstyle, T-Collar, and Pip Kembo. There are two versions of the song; one in Spanish and one in English. Music videos were directed for both versions of the song by American director Gil Green, with the Spanish video premiering on March 10, 2017, and the English video on April 7.

== Background ==
Originally, the song was scheduled to be a collaboration between Pitbull, Britney Spears and Romeo Santos, but Spears and Santos were replaced by Cabello and Balvin, respectively. However, the first version with Spears and Santos has leaked and it can be found on the internet.

== Critical reception ==
In Billboard, Spotify editors named the song as a "steamy single" and highlighted Cabello's "fitting charm".

== Commercial performance ==
"Hey Ma" debuted at number five on the Hot Latin Songs chart with 14,000 downloads sold, marking Pitbull's highest debut ever on the chart and matching Balvin's previous best, with "Ginza". The song also marks Cabello's first entry on the chart. It was certified Gold by the Recording Industry Association of America (RIAA). As of February 21, 2019, the single, which served as one of The Fate of the Furious theme-songs, surpassed 500,000 certified units sold in the United States. The music video for "Hey Ma" surpassed 300 million views on YouTube, making it 3x VEVO Certified.

Internationally, the song reached the top 10 in Spain, Guatemala, Israel and Bulgaria.

== Music video ==
The music video for "Hey Ma" was directed by Gil Green and shot in Miami. As described by Billboard, the "spicy" video is filled with "bright and vivid" scenes representing the Cuban culture as the trio move around the streets interacting with the crowd and dancing in front of "impressive" cars. Scenes from The Fate of the Furious appear in the music video. As of July 2019, the video has surpassed over 330 million views.

== Live performances ==
Balvin, Cabello and Pitbull performed the first televised performance of the song at the 2017 MTV Movie & TV Awards. Griselda Flores from Billboard magazine said that "The trio heated things up when they took the stage to perform the upbeat track", and praised their looks by saying: "Cabello stepped into a strapless, flower-printed red dress wearing it over black shorts that peeked through the dress' front slit. Pitbull and J Balvin complemented Cabello's look by rocking all-black outfits: Balvin in a casual denim pants and leather jacket combo and Mr. 305 in a fitted suit".

== Accolades ==
Year	Organization	Award	Result	Ref.
2017	Latin Grammy Awards	Best Urban Song	Nominated	

== Credits and personnel ==
Credits adapted from the liner notes of The Fate of the Furious: The Album.

Recording

- Camila Cabello's vocals recorded at A Studios (West Hollywood, California)
- Pitbull's vocals recorded at Circle House Studios (Miami, Florida)
- J Balvin's vocals recorded at Artcrime Studios (La Romana, Dominican Republic)
- Mixed at Orange Coyote Studios (Studio City, California)

Management

- Published by Artist Publishing Group West and Made in Harare Publishing Designee admin. by WB Music Corp. (ASCAP), Artist 101 Publishing Group and John Mitchell Publishing Designee admin. by Warner-Tamerlane Publishing Corp. (BMI), Circa 242/Prescription Songs (ASCAP), Sony/ATV Songs LLC/Abuela Y Tia Songs (BMI), Universal Musica Unica Publishing (BMI), Sony/ATV Songs LLC/Milamoon Songs (BMI), Universal Pictures Music (ASCAP), UPG Music Publishing (BMI)
- Pitbull appears courtesy of RCA Records/Mr. 305 Records
- J Balvin appears courtesy of Universal Music Latino
- Camila Cabello appears courtesy of Epic Records, a division of Sony Music Entertainment

Personnel

- Pitbull – lead vocals, songwriting
- J Balvin – lead vocals, songwriting
- Camila Cabello – guest vocals, songwriting
- Sermstyle – songwriting, production, keyboards
- Tinashe "T-Collar" Sibanda;– songwriting, production
- Pip Kembo – songwriting, production
- Johnny Mitchell – songwriting, additional vocals
- David Phung – background vocals
- Edgar Machuca – background vocals
- Rosina "Soaky Siren" Russel – songwriting
- Johnny Yukon – songwriting
- Ryan Gladieux – vocal production
- Andres David Restrepo "Rolo";– vocal production
- Jean Rodríguez – vocal production, engineering
- Daniel Flores – vocal production
- Al Burna – vocal production, engineering
- Matt Beckley – vocal production, engineering
- James Royo – mixing
- Raphael Bautista – assistant mixing
- Todd Norman – assistant mixing

== Charts ==
=== Weekly charts ===
Chart (2017)	Peak position
Argentina (Monitor Latino)	12
Austria (Ö3 Austria Top 40)	73
Belgium (Ultratip Bubbling Under Flanders)	8
Belgium (Ultratip Bubbling Under Wallonia)	7
Bulgaria (PROPHON)	7
Canada Hot 100 (Billboard)	95
Czech Republic Airplay (ČNS IFPI)	59
Chile (Monitor Latino)	15
Colombia Airplay (National-Report)	44
Ecuador (National-Report)	44
France (SNEP)	52
Germany (GfK)	64
Guatemala (Monitor Latino)	8
Hungary (Dance Top 40)	16
Hungary (Rádiós Top 40)	18
Hungary (Single Top 40)	36
Italy (FIMI)	49
Israel International Airplay (Media Forest)	3
Japan (Japan Hot 100)	61
Mexico (Billboard Mexican Airplay)	13
Netherlands (Single Top 100)	92
Panama (Monitor Latino)	17
Portugal (AFP)	55
Romania (Airplay 100)	14
Scottish Singles Sales (Official Charts)	89
Slovakia Airplay (ČNS IFPI)	55
Spain (PROMUSICAE)	6
Sweden Heatseeker (Sverigetopplistan)	11
Switzerland (Schweizer Hitparade)	30
US Bubbling Under Hot 100 (Billboard)	8
US Hot Latin Songs (Billboard)	5
US Latin Airplay (Billboard)	49
US Latin Rhythm Airplay (Billboard)	21

=== Year-end charts ===
Chart (2017)	Position
Argentina (Monitor Latino)	48
Hungary (Dance Top 40)	48
Spain (PROMUSICAE)	23
US Hot Latin Songs (Billboard)	52

== Certifications ==
Region	Certification	Certified units/sales
Italy (FIMI)	Platinum	50,000^{‡}
Spain (Promusicae)	3× Platinum	120,000^{‡}
United States (RIAA)	Gold	500,000^{‡}
^{‡} Sales+streaming figures based on certification alone.
