= PnB Rock discography =

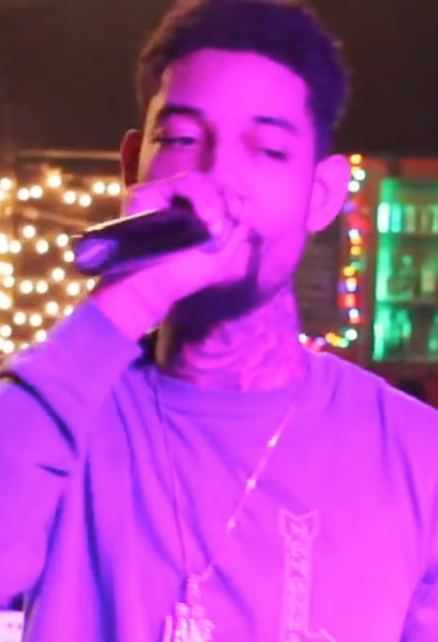
- PnB Rock in 2016
- Studio albums: 2
- EPs: 1
- Singles: 32
- Mixtapes: 6

American rapper PnB Rock released two studio albums, five mixtapes, one extended play (EP), and thirty-two singles, including fifteen as a featured artist.

== Albums ==
=== Studio albums ===
List of studio albums, with selected details and chart positions
Title	Album details	Peak chart positions				
Title	Album details	US	US R&B/ HH	US Rap	CAN	NLD
Catch These Vibes	Released: November 17, 2017; Labels: Atlantic; Formats: Digital download	17	7	6	66	—
TrapStar Turnt PopStar	Released: May 3, 2019; Labels: Atlantic; Formats: Digital download	4	2	1	14	73
"—" denotes a recording that did not chart or was not released in that territory.

=== Mixtapes ===
List of mixtapes, with selected details and chart positions
Title	Album details	Peak chart positions			Certifications
Title	Album details	US	US R&B/ HH	US Rap	Certifications
Real N*gga Bangaz	Released: June 24, 2014; Label: Self-released; Formats: Digital download	—	—	—	
RnB 2	Released: February 10, 2015; Label: Self-released; Formats: Digital download	—	—	—	
RnB 3	Released: October 30, 2015; Label: Atlantic, Empire; Formats: Digital download	—	—	—	
Money, Hoes & Flows (with Fetty Wap)	Released: July 12, 2016; Label: Self-released; Formats: Digital download	—	—	—	
GTTM: Goin Thru the Motions	Released: January 13, 2017; Labels: Atlantic, Empire; Formats: CD, digital download	28	10	7	RIAA: Gold
SoundCloud Daze	Released: January 28, 2022; Labels: Atlantic; Formats: CD, digital download	—	—	—	
"—" denotes a recording that did not chart or was not released in that territory.

== EPs ==
List of EPs, with selected details
Title	Album details
2 Get You Thru the Rain	Released: December 10, 2021; Label: Atlantic; Formats: Digital download, streaming

== Singles ==
=== As lead artist ===
List of singles as lead artist, with selected chart positions, showing year released and album name
Title	Year	Peak chart positions				Certifications	Album
Title	Year	US	US R&B/HH	US Rap	NZ Hot	Certifications	Album
"Fleek"	2015	—	—	—	—		Non-album singles
"Trust Issues" (featuring Yakki Divioshi)	2016	—	—	—	—		Non-album singles
"Selfish"	2016	51	17	13	13	RIAA: 3× Platinum	GTTM: Goin Thru the Motions
"Playa No More" (featuring A Boogie wit da Hoodie and Quavo)	2016	—	—	—	—		GTTM: Goin Thru the Motions
"New Day"	2016	—	—	—	—		GTTM: Goin Thru the Motions
"Gang Up" (with Young Thug, 2 Chainz and Wiz Khalifa)	2017	— (Note: "Gang Up" did not enter the Billboard Hot 100, but peaked at number 13 on the Bubbling Under Hot 100 Singles chart.)	— (Note: "Gang Up" did not enter the Billboard Hot R&B/Hip-Hop Songs chart, but peaked at number four on the Bubbling Under R&B/Hip-Hop Singles chart.)	—	—	RIAA: Gold	The Fate of the Furious: The Album
"Horses" (with Kodak Black and A Boogie wit da Hoodie)	2017	— (Note: "Horses" did not enter the Billboard Hot 100, but peaked at number nine on the Bubbling Under Hot 100 Singles chart.)	— (Note: "Horses" did not enter the Billboard Hot R&B/Hip-Hop Songs chart, but peaked at number one on the Bubbling Under R&B/Hip-Hop Singles chart.)	—	—	RIAA: 2× Platinum	The Fate of the Furious: The Album
"Feelins"	2017	—	—	—	—		Catch These Vibes
"Issues" (featuring Russ)	2017	—	—	—	—		Catch These Vibes
"ABCD (Friend Zone)"	2018	—	—	—	—		TrapStar Turnt PopStar
"Nowadays"	2018	—	—	—	—		TrapStar Turnt PopStar
"I Like Girls" (featuring Lil Skies)	2019	— (Note: "I Like Girls" did not enter the Billboard Hot 100, but peaked at number seven on the Bubbling Under Hot 100 Singles chart.)	48	—	39	RIAA: Gold	TrapStar Turnt PopStar
"Fendi" (featuring Nicki Minaj and Murda Beatz)	2019	—	—	—	—		Non-album singles
"Ordinary" (featuring Pop Smoke)	2020	—	—	—	—		Non-album singles
"Rose Gold" (featuring King Von)	2020	—	—	—	—		Non-album singles
"Forever Never" (featuring Swae Lee and Pink Sweat$)	2021	—	—	—	—		Non-album singles
"Luv Me Again"	2022	—	—	—	—		Non-album singles
"My Life" (with Steve Aoki, David Guetta and Swae Lee)	2025	—	—	—	—		
"—" denotes a recording that did not chart or was not released in that territory.

=== As featured artist ===
List of singles as featured artist, showing year released and album name
Title	Year	Peak chart positions										Certifications	Album
Title	Year	US	US R&B/HH	AUS	FIN	HUN	IRE	NZ	SCO	SWE	UK	Certifications	Album
"She So Bad" (Deejay Ant featuring Santos, Reese Rel and PnB Rock)	2014	—	—	—	—	—	—	—	—	—	—		Non-album singles
"A Long Way" (Quilly featuring PnB Rock and Every Ave)	2015	—	—	—	—	—	—	—	—	—	—		Non-album singles
"Unlimited" (Ca$Hpassion featuring PnB Rock)	2016	—	—	—	—	—	—	—	—	—	—		CA$HPASSION
"Your Style" (Dimitrios Politis featuring PnB Rock)	2016	—	—	—	—	—	—	—	—	—	—		Non-album single
"Jiggy" (Young Zona featuring PnB Rock)	2016	—	—	—	—	—	—	—	—	—	—		Trapped
"Da Gang" (PnB Chizz featuring PnB Rock)	2016	—	—	—	—	—	—	—	—	—	—		Non-album singles
"Sleepin" (2 Milly featuring PnB Rock)	2016	—	—	—	—	—	—	—	—	—	—		Non-album singles
"Party at 1" (Nizzy featuring PnB Rock)	2016	—	—	—	—	—	—	—	—	—	—		Non-album singles
"Ain't S**t" (Mone Yukka featuring PnB Rock)	2016	—	—	—	—	—	—	—	—	—	—		Non-album singles
"Everyday We Lit" (YFN Lucci featuring PnB Rock)	2016	33	12	—	—	—	—	—	—	—	—	RIAA: 2× Platinum	Long Live Nut
"How It Go!" (Yung 187 featuring PnB Rock)	2016	—	—	—	—	—	—	—	—	—	—		Non-album single
"Beast Mode" (A Boogie wit da Hoodie featuring PnB Rock and YoungBoy Never Broke Again)	2017	86	38	—	—	—	—	—	—	—	—	RIAA: Platinum; MC: Platinum	The Bigger Artist
"Dangerous" (Meek Mill featuring Jeremih and PnB Rock)	2018	31	14	—	—	—	—	—	—	—	—	RIAA: Platinum	Championships
"Cross Me" (Ed Sheeran featuring Chance the Rapper and PnB Rock)	2019	25	—	5	9	12	10	6	11	13	4	RIAA: Gold; ARIA: 3× Platinum; BPI: Platinum; MC: Platinum	No.6 Collaborations Project
"Leave Em Alone" (Layton Greene and Lil Baby featuring City Girls and PnB Rock)	2019	60	27	—	—	—	—	—	—	—	—	RIAA: Platinum; BPI: Silver	Control the Streets, Volume 2
"Bad Vibes Forever" (XXXTentacion featuring Trippie Redd and PnB Rock)	2019	85	39	—	—	—	—	—	—	—	—	BPI: Silver	Bad Vibes Forever
"Adore You" (Bizzy Banks featuring PnB Rock)	2021	—	—	—	—	—	—	—	—	—	—		Same Energy
"—" denotes a recording that did not chart or was not released in that territory.

== Other charted and certified songs ==
Songs, with selected chart positions, showing year released and album name
Title	Year	Peak chart positions			Certifications	Album
Title	Year	US	US R&B/HH	NZ Hot	Certifications	Album
"Too Many Years" (Kodak Black featuring PnB Rock)	2016	— (Note: "Too Many Years" did not enter the Billboard Hot 100, but peaked at number one on the Bubbling Under Hot 100 Singles chart.)	42	—	RIAA: Gold	Lil B.I.G. Pac
"Lovin'" (featuring A Boogie wit da Hoodie)	2017	— (Note: "Lovin'" did not enter the Billboard Hot 100, but peaked at number 16 on the Bubbling Under Hot 100 Singles chart.)	— (Note: "Lovin'" did not enter the Billboard Hot R&B/Hip-Hop Songs chart, but peaked at number three on the Bubbling Under R&B/Hip-Hop Singles chart.)	—		Catch These Vibes
"There She Go" (featuring YFN Lucci)	2017	—	—	—	RIAA: Gold	GTTM: Goin Thru the Motions
"Misunderstood"	2017	—	—	—	RIAA: Gold	GTTM: Goin Thru the Motions
"Smash!" (XXXTentacion featuring PnB Rock)	2018	— (Note: "Smash!" did not enter the Billboard Hot 100, but peaked at number 24 on the Bubbling Under Hot 100 Singles chart.)	— (Note: "Smash!" did not enter the Billboard Hot R&B/Hip-Hop Songs chart, but peaked at number eight on the Bubbling Under R&B/Hip-Hop Singles chart.)	—	RIAA: Gold	?
"Middle Child" (featuring XXXTentacion)	2019	91	37	18		PopStar Turnt TrapStar
"—" denotes a recording that did not chart or was not released in that territory.

== Guest Appearances ==
List of non-single guest appearances, with other performing artists, showing year released and album name
Title	Year	Other performer(s)	Album
"Deep End"	2016	Monty	Zoo 16: The Mixtape
"When I Dab (Remix)"	2016	Ken Masters	—N/a
"Might Be (Remix)"	2016	DJ Luke Nasty	—N/a
"All Day"	2016	Kevin Hart, Lil Yachty	Kevin Hart: What Now? (The Mixtape Presents Chocolate Droppa)
"Okay, Fine"	2017	Jay Critch	—N/a
"Balance"	2017	Roy Woods, dvsn	Say Less
"Whatchu Gon Do"	2017	Lil Baby, Marlo	2 The Hard Way
"S.W.I.N.G"	2018	Tory Lanez, Trey Songz	Love Me Now?
"she ready"	2018	Lil Yachty	Lil Boat 2
"Jump Out That"	2018	Skinnyfromthe9	It's An Evil World
"Keys To My Ride"	2018	24hrs	B4 Xmas
"Options"	2019	Fabolous, Gucci Mane, 2 Chainz	Summertime Shootout 3
"Like Me"	2020	Pop Smoke	Meet the Woo 2 (Deluxe)
"Backseat"	2020	Pop Smoke	Shoot for the Stars, Aim for the Moon (Deluxe)
"Get What You Want"	2021	DDG, OG Parker	Die 4 Respect
"Razor"	2021	Belly, Gunna	See You Next Wednesday
"Perfect"	2022	Steve Aoki, 24hrs	Hiroquest: Genesis, Hiroquest 2: Double Helix
