= H2O (disambiguation) =

H_{2}O is the chemical formula for water, which means that each of its molecules contains one oxygen and two hydrogen atoms.

H_{2}O or H2O may also refer to:

== Arts, entertainment and media ==
=== Music ===
- H_{2}O (American band), a punk band
  - H_{2}O (H_{2}O album), 1996
- H_{2}O (Scottish band), a pop band
- H_{2}O (Puerto Rican band), a boy band
- H Two O, a British bassline duo
- H_{2}O (Hall & Oates album), 1982
- "H_{2}O", a song by Leslie Cheung from Leslie, 1984

=== Film and television ===
- H_{2}O (1929 film), a short silent film by Ralph Steiner
- H_{2}O (2002 film), an Indian Kannada-Tamil bilingual film
- H_{2}O (miniseries), a Canadian TV drama
- H_{2}O: Footprints in the Sand, a Japanese visual novel, game, manga and anime
- H_{2}O: Just Add Water, an Australian TV drama series
  - H_{2}O: Mermaid Adventures, an animated spin-off of the original series

== Other uses ==
- Properties of water
- H2O Networks, a British telecommunications company
- H_{2}O Retailing
- H2O Wireless, an American telecommunications company
- H2O (web server), a free and open-source web server software
- List of soft drinks by country

== See also ==
- H20 (disambiguation) (H twenty)
- Hoh (disambiguation) (Hoh or HOH)
- Water (disambiguation)
- Dihydrogen monoxide parody
