= Water (disambiguation) =

Water is a chemical substance with the formula H_{2}O.

A detailed description of the physical and chemical properties of water is at properties of water.

Water may also refer to:

== Liquids and related concepts ==
=== Bodies of water or waterways ===
- Water(s), the oceans of the Earth
- Water, the name given to certain lakes in the Lake District of northern England; see List of lakes in the Lake District

=== Other tangible liquids ===
- Water, a type of horse jumping obstacle
- Amniotic fluid, the liquid around a fetus released before birth as the "water breaks"
- Drinking water
- Stormwater
- Heavy water

=== Other uses ===
- Water (astronomy), an area of the sky
- Water (classical element)
- Water (wuxing)

== Arts, entertainment and media ==
=== Fictional entities ===
- Water (Lexx), a fictional planet
- Water, a fictional planet in the animated television series Shadow Raiders
- The Water (Middle-earth), a fictional river

=== Film ===
- Water (1985 film), a British comedy film set in the Caribbean
- Water (2005 film), an Oscar-nominated drama film set in India and directed by Deepa Mehta
- Water (2006 film), a documentary
- The Water (2009 film), a 2009 short film directed by Kevin Drew

=== Literature ===
- Water (novel), by Bapsi Sidhwa based on the 2005 film

=== Music ===
==== Albums ====
- Water (soundtrack), the soundtrack to the 2005 film
- Water (Gregory Porter album), 2010
- Water (EP), by Sister Hazel, 2018
- The Water (Colin MacIntyre album), 2008
- The Water (San Cisco album), 2017
- Water, a 2003 album by Annabelle Chvostek
- Water, a 2006 album by the Beautiful Girls
- Water, a 1993 album by Conor Oberst
- Water, a 1993 album by Saigon Kick
- Water, a 2008 EP by Salem
- Water, a 1987 album by Zoogz Rift

==== Songs ====
- "Water" (Brad Paisley song), 2010
- "Water" (Elitsa & Stoyan song), 2007
- "Water" (Kanye West song), 2019
- "Water" (Lynsey de Paul song), 1973
- "Water" (Miller & Atkins song), 1966
- "Water" (Tyla song), 2023
- "Water" (Ugly God song), 2016
- "Water", a song by Blonde Redhead from the album Fake Can Be Just as Good, 1997
- "Water", a song by Breaking Benjamin from Saturate, 2002
- "Water", a song by Chris Brown from the album Heartbreak on a Full Moon, 2017
- "Water", a song by Dinosaur Jr. from the album Green Mind, 1991
- "Water", a song by Eggstone from Somersault, 1994
- "Water", a song by Galantis from the album Pharmacy, 2015
- "Water", a song by James Arthur from the album Pisces, 2025
- "Water", a song by Kehlani from the album It Was Good Until It Wasn't, 2020
- "Water", a song by Martika from the album Martika, 1988
- "Water", a song by Matt Brouwer from Imagerical, 2001
- "Water", a song by Oingo Boingo from Farewell, 1996
- "Water", a song by PJ Harvey from the album Dry, 1992
- "Water", a song by Ra Ra Riot from the album Need Your Light, 2016
- "Water", a song by the Who from the single 5:15, 1973
- "The Water", a song by Feist from the album The Reminder, 2007
- "Water", a song by the Zutons from the album The Big Decider, 2024

=== Television ===
==== Channels and station identification ====
- Water, a BBC Two ident

==== Episodes ====
- "Water" (Battlestar Galactica), an episode of the reimagined Battlestar Galactica television series
- "Water" (Stargate Universe), an episode of the Stargate Universe Television series
- "Water", an episode of the television series Teletubbies

==== Seasons or series ====
- Book 1: Water, the first season of the TV series Avatar: The Last Airbender

== Places ==
- Water, Devon, a location in England, UK
- Water, Lancashire, a hamlet in England, UK

== See also ==
- Outline of water
- H20 (disambiguation)
- Hoh (disambiguation)
- Waters (disambiguation)
- Broadwater (disambiguation)
