= Championships (album) =

Studio album by Meek Mill
- Released: November 30, 2018
- Recorded: 2018
- Genres: Hip-hop; trap
- Length: 69:49
- Labels: Maybach; Atlantic
- Producers: Rick Ross (exec.); Meek Mill (also exec.); Andrew Meoray; ATL Jacob; Austin Powerz; Bangladesh; Beat Menace; Benny Wond3r; Jovan J Dawkins; Butter Beats (Dolla Bill Kidz); Cardo; Cubeatz; C-Sick; Dario; Takbar 215; Jahlil Beats; Don Cannon; EY; Louie V Gutta; Hit-Boy; Hitmaka; Kendxll; Larrance Dopson; Maaly Raw; OZ; Papamitrou; Prince Chrishan; Pro Logic; Tay Keith; Tarik Azzouz; The Trillionaires; Westen Weiss; Wheezy

Meek Mill chronology
Legends of the Summer (2018)	Championships (2018)	Quarantine Pack (2020)

Singles from Championships
- 1. "Dangerous" Released: November 5, 2018; 2. "Going Bad" Released: January 22, 2019; 3. "24/7" Released: April 16, 2019

Championships is the fourth studio album by American rapper Meek Mill. It was released on November 30, 2018, by Atlantic Records and Maybach Music Group. The album features guest appearances from Fabolous, Anuel AA, Cardi B, Rick Ross, Jay-Z, Future, Roddy Ricch, Young Thug, Drake, Kodak Black, Ella Mai, 21 Savage, Melii, Jeremih, PnB Rock, and the Weeknd. Meanwhile, production was handled by Bangladesh, Cardo, Cubeatz, C-Sick, Don Cannon, Hit-Boy, Hitmaka, Prince Chrishan, Tay Keith, and Wheezy, among others. It was supported by the singles "Dangerous" (featuring Jeremih and PnB Rock) "Going Bad" (featuring Drake), and "24/7" (featuring Ella Mai).

Championships received positive reviews from critics and debuted atop the US Billboard 200, selling 229,000 album-equivalent units in its first week.

== Background ==
On July 21, 2017, Meek Mill released his third studio album, Wins & Losses. On November 6, Meek Mill was sentenced to two to four years in state prison for violating parole and served five months at the State Correctional Institution – Chester in Chester, Pennsylvania. On April 24, 2018, Mill was released pending the outcome of the appeal to the Pennsylvania supreme court. The Philadelphia district attorney had petitioned Judge Brinkley for his release, citing credibility issues with the arresting officer in his initial 2008's conviction. Brinkley had declined and instead scheduled the case for a hearing. Hours after his release from prison, Michael G. Rubin, a minority owner of the Philadelphia 76ers and long-time supporter of Mill, flew Mill in by helicopter to a 76ers basketball game to perform a ceremonial bell-ringing on the court before the start of the game. Garnering support from other public figures such as Jay-Z and Kevin Hart, Mill stated that he would like to use his situation to "shine a light" on the criminal justice system.

On July 6, 2018, Mill released his first new music since his release from prison with a release of his fifth extended play, titled Legends of the Summer. On September 28, Mill announced that he would be releasing an album "real soon, like in a matter of weeks." On November 8, during a conversation regarding criminal justice reform at Georgetown University, Mill announced that the album would be released in November. The album was reported to include songs about Mill's "experiences and issues with social justice" following his release from prison earlier in 2018.

== Release and promotion ==
On November 14, 2018, Meek Mill appeared in a Vogue interview, playing a portion of his collaboration with rapper Cardi B and revealing the album would be released on November 30, 2018. He later announced the album's title, release date and cover art on social media on November 16, 2018. The cover art, a close-up shot of Meek Mill's face, was called "minimalist". The tracklist was revealed on November 29, 2018.

=== Singles ===
On November 22, 2018, "Oodles o' Noodles Babies" and "Uptown Vibes" featuring Fabolous and Anuel AA were released as promotional singles. Meek Mill performed "Oodles o' Noodles Babies" on The Tonight Show Starring Jimmy Fallon the same day. The lead single from the album, "Going Bad" featuring Drake was released to urban contemporary radio on January 22, 2019.

=== Other songs ===
The music video for the song, "Intro", was released on December 10, 2018. The music video for "Trauma" was released on December 19, 2018.

== Critical reception ==
Professional ratings
Aggregate scores
Source	Rating
Metacritic	77/100
Review scores
Source	Rating
Clash	8/10
Consequence of Sound	B
Exclaim!	9/10
The Guardian	3/5 stars
HipHopDX	3.9/5
NME	4/5 stars
Pitchfork	7.7/10
Rolling Stone	3.5/5 stars
Vice (Expert Witness)	B+
XXL	4/5 (XL)

Championships received very positive reviews from critics. At Metacritic, which assigns a normalized rating out of 100 to reviews from mainstream publications, the album received an average score of 77, based on 10 reviews, indicating "generally favorable reviews". Writing for Billboard, Sowmya Krishnamurthy stated, "Meek raps with the same fervor he's always had, but there's a discernable focus on Championships. He's bridled his high-octane flow and is more clear-eyed. Incarceration has sparked a new purpose in him, as an activist and also as a man coming into his own." She also opined the reunion of Mill and Drake in "Going Bad" "is a high point" of the album, while "On Me," "features Cardi B stealing the show in perhaps her most confident rapping to date." Evan Rytlewski of Pitchfork gave the album a 7.7 out of 10 saying, "Despite being born of injustice, an air of victory hangs over Meek's first full-length since he was released from prison. It captures an intensity that the Philadelphia rapper is known for and best at."

Writing for Clash, Aaron Bishop called the album Meek's best to date saying, "On Championships, his fourth studio album, Meek Mill raps with the same hunger, passion and drive that he came into the game with - which earned him veteran status at MMG as Rick Ross’s right hand lieutenant - but now with a renewed sense of purpose and direction." In a positive review for Exclaim!, Erin Lowers praised the album stating, "As much as Championships is filled with nonchalant club/street anthems, it's also about healing. Tempered by both celebration and struggle, Championships shows the duality of Mill's world--one that still reflects on the past, but has made leaps towards his future--and that's perhaps the greatest win of them all."

== Commercial performance ==
Championships debuted at number one on the US Billboard 200 chart with 229,000 album-equivalent units, of which 42,000 came from pure album sales in its first week. It became his second number-one album, and logged the fourth-largest streaming week of 2018 for an album. In its second week, the album fell to number two on the chart, moving another 129,000 equivalent units that week. In its third week, the album remained at number two on the chart, moving another 83,000 album-equivalent units that week. In its fourth week, the album dropped to number six on the chart, moving another 54,000 units that week. On June 5, 2019, the album was certified platinum by the Recording Industry Association of America (RIAA) for combined sales and album-equivalent units of over a million units in the United States.

== Track listing ==
Credits adapted from Tidal and Spotify. Credits for "On Me" are also adapted from Apple Music.

No.	Title	Writer(s)	Producer(s)	Length
1.	"Intro"	Robert Williams; Nikolas Papamitrou; Phil Collins	Papamitrou; Andrew Meoray^{[b]}	3:33
2.	"Trauma"	Williams; Donald Cannon; Larrance Dopson; Les Holroyd	Don Cannon; Rance Dopson^{[a]}	3:58
3.	"Uptown Vibes" (featuring Fabolous and Anuel AA)	Williams; John Jackson; Emmanuel Santiago; Nija Charles; Papamitrou	Papamitrou	3:10
4.	"On Me" (featuring Cardi B)	Williams; Belcalis Almánzar; Shondrae Crawford; Desmond Peterson; Charles; Jovan J. Dawkins	Bangladesh; Benny Wond3r; Jovan J. Dawkins^{[a]}	3:45
5.	"What's Free" (featuring Rick Ross and Jay-Z)	Williams; William Roberts II; Shawn Carter; Nicholas Warwar; Tarik Azzouz; Clemm Rishad; Christopher Wallace; Carlos Broady; Nashiem Myrick; Hal David	Streetrunner; Azzouz	6:02
6.	"Respect the Game"	Williams; Papamitrou; Omar Gomez; Dopson; Lonnie Smith	Papamitrou; Beat Menace^{[a]}; Rance Dopson^{[a]}	3:12
7.	"Splash Warning" (featuring Future, Roddy Ricch, and Young Thug)	Williams; Nayvadius Wilburn; Rodrick Moore, Jr.; Jeffery Williams; Jacob Canady	ATL Jacob	2:48
8.	"Championships"	Williams; Dario Omanovic; Dopson; Toney Fountain	Dario; Rance Dopson^{[a]}	4:21
9.	"Going Bad" (featuring Drake)	Williams; Aubrey Graham; Wesley Glass; Westen Weiss	Wheezy; Weiss^{[a]}	3:00
10.	"Almost Slipped"	Williams; Jamaal Henry; Frank Dechellis; Taylor Sanchez	Maaly Raw; The Trillionaires	4:06
11.	"Tic Tac Toe" (featuring Kodak Black)	Williams; Dieuson "Kodak Black" Octave; Brytavious Chambers	Tay Keith	3:05
12.	"24/7" (featuring Ella Mai)	Williams; Ella Howell; Beyoncé Knowles-Carter; Eyobed Getachew; Ozan Yildirim; Austin Schindler; Andrew Franklin; Scott Storch; Robert Waller; Charles	Austin Powerz; EY; OZ; Pro Logic	3:41
13.	"Oodles o' Noodles Babies"	Williams; Antonio Jimenez; Clarence Scarborough	Butter Beats (Dolla Bill Kidz); Kendxll^{[c]}	3:01
14.	"Pay You Back" (featuring 21 Savage)	Williams; Shayaa Abraham-Joseph; Glass; Kevin Gomringer; Tim Gomringer	Wheezy; Cubeatz	3:55
15.	"100 Summers"	Williams; Chauncey Hollis	Hit-Boy	2:43
16.	"Wit the Shits (W.T.S.)" (featuring Melii)	Williams; Audrey Ducasse; Charles Dumazer	C-Sick	2:50
17.	"Stuck in My Ways"	Williams; Ronald LaTour; John Harrison	Cardo	3:11
18.	"Dangerous" (featuring Jeremih and PnB Rock)	Williams; Jeremih Felton; Rakim Allen; Christopher Dotson; Christian Ward; James Allen Worthy; Gabrielle Nowee; Melvin Moore; Donald DeGrate	Prince Chrishan; Hitmaka	3:53
19.	"Cold Hearted II"	Williams; Papamitrou; Dopson; Gomez; Abel Tesfaye; Mike Lévy; Adam Feeney	Papamitrou; Beat Menace^{[a]}; Rance Dopson^{[a]}	5:01
Total length:				69:15

Notes

- ^{^[a]} signifies a co-producer
- ^{^[b]} signifies an additional producer
- ^{^[c]} signifies an uncredited co-producer

Sample credits

- "Intro" contains a sample of "In the Air Tonight", written by Phil Collins and Hugh Padgham, and performed by Phil Collins.
- "Trauma" contains a sample of "Get Away", written by Albert Johnson and Kejuan Muchita, and performed by Mobb Deep; and a sample of "Taking Me Higher", written by Les Holroyd, and performed by Barclay James Harvest.
- "What's Free" contains a sample of "What's Beef?", written by Christopher Wallace, Nashiem Myrick, and Carlos Broady, and performed by The Notorious B.I.G.; and a sample of "Close to You", written and performed by Richard Evans.
- "Respect the Game" contains a sample of "A Garden of Peace", written and performed by Lonnie Liston Smith.
- "Championships" contains a sample of "I Found the Girl", written and performed by Toney Fountaine.
- "24/7" contains samples of "Me, Myself and I", written by Beyoncé Knowles, Scott Storch, and Robert Waller, and performed by Beyoncé.
- "Oodles o' Noodles Babies" contains a sample of "Love Changes", written by Skip Scarborough, and performed by Mother's Finest.
- "Stuck in My Ways" contains a sample from "Welcome to Creepshow", written and performed by John Harrison.
- "Cold Hearted II" contains a sample from "I Was Never There", written by Abel Tesfaye, Mike Lévy and Adam Feeney, and performed by The Weeknd; and an interpolation of "We Don't Give a Fuck", written by Earl Simmons, Jason Phillips, David Styles and Irving Lorenzo Jr., and performed by DMX featuring Jadakiss and Styles P.

== Personnel ==
Credits adapted from Tidal.

Instrumentation

- Chris Payton – guitar (tracks 2, 6, 8, 19)
- Quintin Gulledge – organ (track 2)
- Rance Dopson – organ (tracks 2, 6, 8, 19), keyboards (tracks 6, 8, 19), strings (tracks 6, 8, 19)
- Vinny Venditto – keyboards (track 5)
- Dammo Farmer – bass (tracks 6, 8)
- Khirye Tyler – keyboards (tracks 6, 8, 19), organ (tracks 6, 8, 19), strings (tracks 6, 8, 19)

Technical

- Anthony Cruz – recording (all tracks)
- Dylan Del Olmo – recording (tracks 2, 6, 8, 19)
- Evan LaRay Brunson – recording (track 4)
- Mac Attkisson – additional recording (track 14)
- Gimel "Young Guru" Keaton – mixing (tracks 1–8, 10–17, 19)
- Jaycen Joshua – mixing (tracks 9, 18)
- Colin Leonard – mastering (all tracks)
- Dave Kutch – mastering (track 18)
- Alex Estevez – engineer (tracks 1, 3, 6–8, 10–12, 14–17, 19)
- Lou Carrao – engineer (tracks 1, 3, 6–8, 10–12, 14, 15, 17, 19)
- Steven Xia – engineer (tracks 1, 3, 6–8, 10, 11, 14–17, 19), recording (track 12)
- James "Jayme Be" Belt – engineer (tracks 2, 5, 13, 18)
- William "Bilz" Dougan – engineer (tracks 2, 4, 5, 13, 18)
- Douglas "Voli" Martung – engineer (track 4), additional arrangement (track 5), editor (track 5)
- Jacob Richards – engineer (tracks 9, 18)
- Mike Seaberg – engineer (tracks 9, 18)
- Rashawn McLean – engineer (tracks 9, 18)

== Charts ==
=== Weekly charts ===
Chart (2018)	Peak position
Australian Albums (ARIA)	26
Belgian Albums (Ultratop Flanders)	53
Belgian Albums (Ultratop Wallonia)	132
Canadian Albums (Billboard)	1
Danish Albums (Hitlisten)	30
Dutch Albums (Album Top 100)	5
French Albums (SNEP)	83
Irish Albums (IRMA)	39
Latvian Albums (LAIPA)	25
New Zealand Albums (RMNZ)	34
Norwegian Albums (VG-lista)	20
Swedish Albums (Sverigetopplistan)	22
Swiss Albums (Schweizer Hitparade)	48
UK Albums (Official Charts)	33
UK R&B Albums (Official Charts)	3
US Billboard 200	1
US Top R&B/Hip-Hop Albums (Billboard)	1

=== Year-end charts ===
Chart (2019)	Position
Australian Urban Albums (ARIA)	79
Canadian Albums (Billboard)	21
US Billboard 200	7
US Top R&B/Hip-Hop Albums (Billboard)	3
US Rolling Stone 200	15
Chart (2020)	Position
US Billboard 200	128
US Top R&B/Hip-Hop Albums (Billboard)	87

=== Decade-end charts ===
Chart (2010–2019)	Position
US Billboard 200	95

== Certifications ==
Region	Certification	Certified units/sales
Canada (Music Canada)	Platinum	80,000^{‡}
Denmark (IFPI Danmark)	Gold	10,000^{‡}
United Kingdom (BPI)	Silver	60,000^{‡}
United States (RIAA)	Platinum	1,000,000^{‡}
^{‡} Sales+streaming figures based on certification alone.
