= Legends of the Summer =

Legends of the Summer may refer to:

- Legends of the Summer (EP), by Meek Mill, 2018
- Legends of the Summer Stadium Tour, a 2013 concert tour by Justin Timberlake and Jay-Z
