= Going Bad =

2019 single by Meek Mill featuring Drake

Single by Meek Mill featuring Drake

from the album Championships
- Released: January 22, 2019
- Recorded: 2018
- Genre: Hip hop; trap
- Length: 3:00
- Label: Atlantic; Maybach
- Songwriters: Robert Williams; Aubrey Graham; Wesley Glass; Westen Weiss
- Producers: Wheezy; Westen Weiss

Meek Mill singles chronology
"Dangerous" (2018)	"Going Bad" (2019)	"24/7" (2019)

Drake singles chronology
"Mob Ties" (2019)	"Going Bad" (2019)	"Girls Need Love" (Remix) (2019)

Music video
- "Going Bad" on YouTube

"Going Bad" is a song by the American rapper Meek Mill featuring the Canadian rapper Drake. It was the first single released from his album Championships (2018) on January 22, 2019, to US urban contemporary radio. The music video was teased in February 2019 and also released that month. The single was Mill's first and Drake's 24th number one single on Billboard's Rhythmic Songs chart in its March 30, 2019, issue.

== Music video ==
On February 6, 2019, a 30-second clip was put on Mill's Instagram page teasing the music video. It was officially released in full on February 7. The video was directed by Kid Art, and has Mill and Drake taking part in lavish activities typically associated with wealthy people. It was released in 2019 during Black History Month. T.I., Nipsey Hussle, Mustard, Swizz Beatz, Shy Glizzy, PnB Rock, J. Prince and YK Osiris are included in the music video, alongside Mill and Drake.

== In popular culture ==
The song was used in the trailer of Bad Boys: Ride or Die (2024).

== Charts ==
=== Weekly charts ===
Chart (2019)	Peak position
Australia (ARIA)	32
Australia Urban (ARIA)	7
Belgium (Ultratip Bubbling Under Flanders)	3
Belgium (Ultratip Bubbling Under Wallonia)	13
Canada Hot 100 (Billboard)	3
Czech Republic Singles Digital (ČNS IFPI)	66
France (SNEP)	126
Germany (GfK)	92
Greece International Digital Singles (IFPI)	7
Hungary (Stream Top 40)	30
Ireland (IRMA)	19
Lithuania (AGATA)	31
Netherlands (Single Top 100)	71
New Zealand (Recorded Music NZ)	36
Portugal (AFP)	44
Scottish Singles Sales (Official Charts)	3
Slovakia Singles Digital (ČNS IFPI)	49
Sweden (Sverigetopplistan)	60
Switzerland (Schweizer Hitparade)	44
UK Singles (Official Charts)	13
UK Hip Hop/R&B (Official Charts)	5
US Billboard Hot 100	6
US Hot R&B/Hip-Hop Songs (Billboard)	2
US Pop Airplay (Billboard)	40
US Rhythmic Airplay (Billboard)	1
US Rolling Stone Top 100	39

=== Year-end charts ===
Chart (2019)	Position
Australia (ARIA)	69
Canada (Canadian Hot 100)	24
Portugal (AFP)	151
UK Singles (Official Charts Company)	81
US Billboard Hot 100	18
US Hot R&B/Hip-Hop Songs (Billboard)	9
US Rhythmic (Billboard)	8
US Rolling Stone Top 100	9

== Certifications ==
Region	Certification	Certified units/sales
Australia (ARIA)	2× Platinum	140,000^{‡}
Canada (Music Canada)	5× Platinum	400,000^{‡}
Denmark (IFPI Danmark)	Platinum	90,000^{‡}
France (SNEP)	Gold	100,000^{‡}
Germany (BVMI)	Gold	200,000^{‡}
Italy (FIMI)	Gold	25,000^{‡}
New Zealand (RMNZ)	3× Platinum	90,000^{‡}
Poland (ZPAV)	Gold	25,000^{‡}
Portugal (AFP)	Platinum	10,000^{‡}
Spain (Promusicae)	Gold	30,000^{‡}
United Kingdom (BPI)	2× Platinum	1,200,000^{‡}
United States (RIAA)	5× Platinum	5,000,000^{‡}
^{‡} Sales+streaming figures based on certification alone.

== Release history ==
Region	Date	Format	Label	Ref.
United States	January 22, 2019	Urban contemporary radio	Atlantic; Maybach Music	
