= On Me =

On Me may refer to:

- "On Me" (Meek Mill song), a 2018 song
- "On Me" (Lil Baby song), a 2020 song
- "On Me", a 2015 song by the Game from The Documentary 2
- "On Me", a 2017 song by Andrew Hyatt from Iron & Ashes
- "On Me", a 2017 song by Chris Brown from Heartbreak on a Full Moon
- "On Me", a 2017 song by Lil Yachty and Young Thug from Control the Streets, Volume 1
- "On Me", a 2020 song by Thomas Rhett and Kane Brown featuring Ava Max from the soundtrack of Scoob!
- "On Me", a 2020 song by Exo-SC from 1 Billion Views
