= Brandon Bell (music producer) =

American record producer and songwriter

Donut
- Also known as: Williedonut, Donut
- Born: Brandon Kenneth Bell
- Origin: Houston, Texas, United States
- Genres: Pop, hip hop, R&B
- Occupations: Record producer, songwriter
- Years active: 2013–present
- Label: Girlslovedonuts

Brandon Kenneth Bell, professionally known as Donut, is an American record producer and songwriter who has produced songs for Jeremih and PnB Rock, among others.

== Career ==
Bell received the moniker Donut from Pharrell Williams’ brother Pharaoh, who mentored Bell in his early career. He would later travel to Philadelphia and then Los Angeles by way of a spontaneous Atlanta trip to meet fellow producer Needlz, with whom he began to work with after Bell reached out to Needlz to buy recording equipment from him on Craigslist. This began a long-term partnership where they would exchange beats.

In a 2016 Billboard article celebrating the success of their production "Oui" for Jeremih, it was revealed that both Needlz and Bell worked on contributions to what became Rihanna's project Anti, but did not make the cut. They also teased an "80s-infused" potential single for a forthcoming Keri Hilson album, which was subsequently shelved. A song for Hilson, "Somethin (Bout U)", would be released a decade later on her 2025 comeback album We Need to Talk: Love.

== Discography ==
Title	Year	Other artist(s)	Album
"Love Me, Love Me Not"	2012	Keke Palmer	Keke Palmer (mixtape)
"Lolly" (Featuring Justin Bieber & Juicy J)	2013	Maejor Ali	Non-album single
"Rick James"	2014	Keyshia Cole, Juicy J	Point of No Return
"No Complications"	2014	Keyshia Cole	Point of No Return
"I Love You"	2014	Tamar Braxton	Calling All Lovers
"Oui"	2015	Jeremih	Late Nights
"Hungry"	2016	Fergie	Double Dutchess
"Mona Lisa"	2016	The Lonely Island	Popstar: Never Stop Never Stopping
"Sparetime"	2016	Eric Bellinger	Eventually
"Selfish"	2017	PnB Rock	GTTM: Goin Thru the Motions
"Coupe"	2018	PnB Rock	Catch These Vibes
"From Now On"	2018	Zac Brown Band	The Greatest Showman: Reimagined
"History"	2019	Fetty Wap	History
"No More Questions"	2024	A Boogie wit da Hoodie	Better Off Alone
"Somethin (Bout U)"	2025	Keri Hilson	We Need to Talk: Love
"Aliens"	2026	BTS	Arirang
