= Broadwater =

Broadwater, Broad Water or Broadwaters may refer to:

== Places ==
=== Australia ===
==== New South Wales ====
- Broadwater National Park, in New South Wales
- Broadwater, New South Wales, a town in the Northern Rivers

==== Queensland ====
- Broadwater, Queensland, a locality in the Southern Downs Region near Stanthorpe
- Gold Coast Broadwater, the bay in the Gold Coast
  - Electoral district of Broadwater, an polling area surrounding the Gold Coast Broadwater
- Lake Broadwater (also known as Broadwater Lagoon), a protected area in the Western Downs Region, near Dalby

==== Western Australia ====
- Broadwater, Western Australia, a suburb of Busselton

=== United Kingdom ===
==== England ====
- Broadwater Farm, Tottenham, London
  - Broadwater Farm riot, 1985 race riots
- Broadwater, West Sussex
  - Broadwater (electoral division), a West Sussex County Council constituency
- Broadwater, Hertfordshire
- The Broadwater, Berkshire. The name given to a small section of the River Blackwater, and the historical name of Twyford Brook, both tributaries of the River Loddon.
- Broadwater School, Godalming
- Broadwater Green, London
- The Broad Water, an alternative name for Tixall Wide, Staffordshire
- Broadwaters, ward in Wyre Forest, Worcestershire

==== Wales ====
- Broad Water, a salt water lagoon in Gwynedd

=== United States ===
- Broadwater Energy, a proposed liquid natural gas terminal proposed for Long Island Sound
- Broadwater, Missouri
- Broadwater County, Montana
- Broadwater, Nebraska

== People with the surname ==
- Charles Arthur Broadwater (1840–1892), American businessman and banker
- Chris Broadwater (born 1972), Louisiana politician
- W. Craig Broadwater (1950–2006), a United States federal judge

== Other uses ==
- USS Broadwater (APA-139), US Navy ship
- Broadwater Development, an American casino holding company
