= H2O Networks =

British telecommunications company

- Company type: Unknown
- Industry: Telecommunications
- Founded: Leeds, West Yorkshire, England (2008)
- Headquarters: Newton-le-Willows, Merseyside, England
- Key people: Elfed Thomas (CEO)
- Products: Fibrecity
- Revenue: Unknown
- Operating income: Unknown
- Number of employees: Unknown
- Parent: i3 Group

H2O Networks, sometimes called the Water Networks, was a British telecommunications company founded in 2003 by Elfed Thomas. It was supposed to be rolling out Fibrecity around the UK. They were formally part of the i3 Group.

H2O Networks in their Fibrecity (Bournemouth) and Fibrecity (Dundee) guises ceased their builds in October 2010 stating that there would be a short delay due to company restructuring. Their installation contractors in both cities were laid off.

In January 2011 it was announced that there had been a management buy-out of the H2O Networks part of the i3 business, including Fibrecity, by the ex i3 Group CCO Greg Mesch, the new company is to be called City Fibre Holdings.

Revelations about the financial backing behind H2O Networks were released in February 2011. H2O was one of ten companies used by Stephen Dartnell and his co-conspirators to fraudulently obtain over £250m, with H2O the biggest victim, with an amount of over £160m.

Total Asset Finance, the backers, were subject to an investigation by the Serious Fraud Office and, allegedly owed a Belgian bank over £130 million. Over £90 Million of this is apparently related to loans being used to finance H2O Networks. Four individuals were convicted in 2017 of conspiracy to commit fraud, and two acquitted.

The crown court case started in September 2016, with the final sentencing handed down in February 2017.

George Alexander and Stephen Dartnell, of Total Asset Limited, were sentenced to 12 and 15 years respectively at Southwark Crown Court. Simon Mundy, who worked for KBC Lease was sentenced to 7 years. Carl Cumiskey of H2O Networks Limited was sentenced to 10 year's imprisonment. Elfed Thomas was found not guilty and exonerated from all charges.

In January 2018, Elfed Thomas announced the launch of his first business venture since the court case, British Fibre Networks, which aims to build pure fibre connections to more than 35% of new homes by 2021.
