= Waters =

Waters may refer to:

== Places ==
- A body of water
- Territorial waters
- Waters, a Scots term for a type of river
- Waters, Michigan, USA; an unincorporated community

== Groups, organizations ==
- Waters (band), an American band
- Waters Corporation, an American corporation that produces products for chromatography

== Transport and vehicular ==
- USS Waters (DD-115), a destroyer in the U.S. Navy
- USNS Waters (T-AGS-45), a U.S. Navy Vessel

== Other uses ==
- Waters (name), a surname
- Waters (magazine), a financial technology magazine
- Waters, an official magazine of the Vancouver Aquarium
- Waters v. Churchill, a 1994 U.S. Supreme Court decision on the free-speech rights of public employees at work
- The Waters, a 2014 mixtape album by Mick Jenkins

== See also ==
- Water (disambiguation)
- Watters (disambiguation)
- Walters (disambiguation)
