= Jason Tsai =

Taiwanese businessman

- 蔡吉春
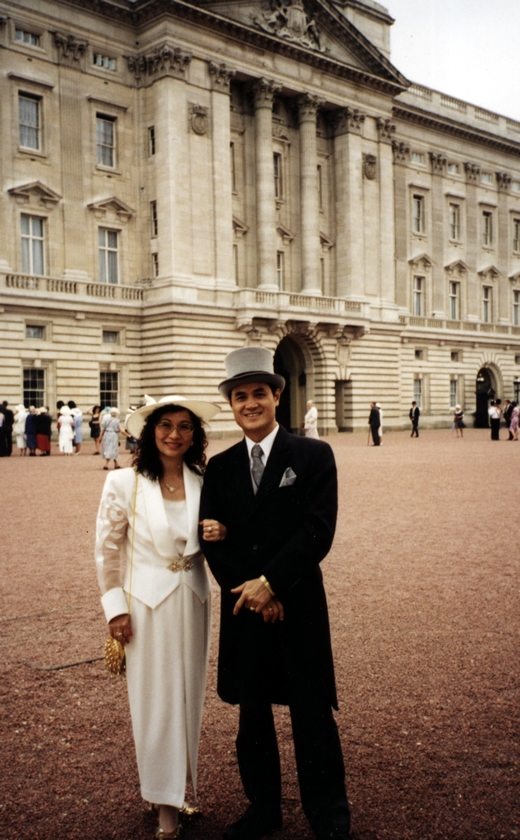
- Jason Tsai and his wife in front of Buckingham Palace, July 1997
- Born: Tsai Ji-chun; 17 May 1951 (age 74); Tainan County, Taiwan
- Education: Birmingham University
- Occupation: Businessman
- Known for: Founder & chairman of Entagroup: Entatech UK Ltd; Entamedia Ltd; Enta.net
- Criminal charges: Carousel fraud, Contempt of Court
- Criminal penalty: 18 months imprisonment
- Spouse: Ruth Tsai
- Children: 2
- Awards: see awards and achievements

Jason Tsai (born Tsai Ji-chun Chinese: 蔡吉春; pinyin: Cài Jíchūn; 17 May 1951 at Tainan County, Taiwan, is a Taiwanese founder and chairman of the Entagroup of telecommunications companies in the United Kingdom (UK); including Entatech UK Ltd, Entamedia Ltd, and Enta.net. He is also the founder of UK Telford Chinese School, and the president of The Tsai Lao-Chi Charitable Foundation in the UK.

His British-registered company Changtel was found by Her Majesty's Revenue and Customs (HMRC) to have participated in carousel fraud, as a result of which Tsai lost control of Entatech. On 8 May 2017, as the final link to that fraud, Entatech entered administration, and 50 people lost their jobs overnight. On 21 July 2017, Tsai was sentenced to imprisonment for 18 months at the High Court of Justice (Chancery Division) for Contempt of Court on account of 27 breaches of a Freezing Order.

== Charity and sponsorship ==
- Tsai Lau-Chi Charitable Foundation (Reg. charity number 1069997)
- UK Telford Chinese School, promoting Chinese culture to the West
- Tsai's Gallery in Enta HQ; collections from Taiwanese oil painting, sculpture, ceramic art, and publications, etc.

== Awards and achievements ==
- Director of the Anglo-Chinese Economic and Trade Association
- Youth Model Awards of Overseas Taiwanese Entrepreneur (1995)
- Chairman of the Taiwanese Chamber of Commerce in the United Kingdom (1998)
- Chairman of the Taiwanese Chamber of Commerce in Europe (1999)
- Councillor of the Overseas Chinese Affairs Committee (2000–2006)
- Entrepreneur of the Year, Comms Business Awards (2010)
