= 24/7 (Meek Mill song) =

Single by Meek Mill featuring Ella Mai

from the album Championships
- Released: April 16, 2019
- Recorded: 2018
- Genre: Hip hop; R&B
- Length: 3:41
- Label: Atlantic; Maybach Music; 10 Summers; Interscope
- Songwriter(s): Williams; Nija Charles; Beyoncé Knowles-Carter; Ella Howell; Eyobed Getachew; Ozan Yildirim; Austin Schindler; Andrew Franklin; Scott Storch; Robert Waller
- Producer(s): Austin Powerz; EY; OZ; Pro Logic

Meek Mill singles chronology
"Going Bad" (2019)	"24/7" (2019)	"Tap" (2019)

Ella Mai singles chronology
"Shot Clock" (2019)	"24/7" (2019)	"Put It All on Me" (2019)

"24/7" is a song by the American rapper Meek Mill featuring English singer Ella Mai. With a sampling of "Me, Myself, and I" by Beyoncé, the song debuted and peaked at number 54 on the week of December 15, 2018, on the Billboard Hot 100, a week after the release of the album. The track was released as the second single from Meek Mill's album Championships on April 16, 2019.

== Charts ==
=== Weekly charts ===
Chart (2019)	Peak position
New Zealand Hot Singles (Recorded Music NZ)	21
UK Singles (OCC)	66
US Billboard Hot 100	54
US Hot R&B/Hip-Hop Songs (Billboard)	25
US Rhythmic (Billboard)	9

=== Year-end charts ===
Chart (2019)	Position
US Hot R&B/Hip-Hop Songs (Billboard)	66
US Rhythmic (Billboard)	46

== Certifications ==
Region	Certification	Certified units/sales
New Zealand (RMNZ)	Gold	15,000^{‡}
United Kingdom (BPI)	Silver	200,000^{‡}
United States (RIAA)	Platinum	1,000,000^{‡}
^{‡} Sales+streaming figures based on certification alone.
