= The Booty Tape =

Mixtape by Ugly God
- Released: August 4, 2017
- Recorded: 2015–2017
- Genre: Comedy hip hop; trap; dirty rap; cloud rap
- Length: 23:49
- Label: Asylum
- Producer: Ugly God; Danny Wolf; HM Surf; Nikko Bunkin; ParisVVS

Ugly God chronology
The Booty Tape (2017)	Just a Lil Something Before the Album... (2018)

Singles from The Booty Tape
- 1. "Water" Released: November 18, 2016; 2. "Fuck Ugly God" Released: June 27, 2017; 3. "No Lies" Released: July 31, 2017

Professional ratings
Review scores
Source	Rating
HipHopDX	3.5/5 stars

The Booty Tape is the debut commercial mixtape by American rapper Ugly God. It was released on August 4, 2017, by Asylum Records. Recording sessions took place from 2015 to 2017, with all the writing, recording and its executive production credited to Ugly God himself, alongside the additional production from Danny Wolf and Nikko Bunkin, among others. The mixtape features a solo guest appearance from American rapper Wiz Khalifa.

== Singles ==
On March 16, 2016, Ugly God premiered a song, called "Water" through his account on SoundCloud. It was re-released for digital download as the official lead single for his upcoming commercial debut project on November 19, 2016, by Asylum Records. The song peaked at number 80 on the US Billboard Hot 100.

"Fuck Ugly God" was released as the album's second single on June 27, 2017. "No Lies" was released as the album's third and final single on July 31, 2017. The song features a guest appearance from American rapper Wiz Khalifa.

=== Promotional singles ===
The album's first promotional single, "Bitch!", was released on February 1, 2017. The album's second promotional single, "Stop Smoking Black & Milds", was released on August 3, 2017.

== Commercial performance ==
In the United States, The Booty Tape debuted at number 27 on the US Billboard 200 chart, earning 12,000 album-equivalent units, with less than 3,000 coming from pure album sales in its first week.

== Track listing ==
The Booty Tape track listing
No.	Title	Writer(s)	Producer(s)	Length
1.	"Welcome to the Booty Tape"	Royce Davison	Ugly God	2:21
2.	"Stop Smoking Black & Milds"	Davison	Ugly God	1:55
3.	"I'm a Nasty Hoe"	Davison	Ugly God	2:59
4.	"I'm Tryna Fuck"	Davison	Ugly God	1:52
5.	"Fuck Ugly God"	Davison	ParisVVS	2:15
6.	"No Lies" (featuring Wiz Khalifa)	Davison; Cameron Thomaz	Nikko Bunkin	3:07
7.	"Bitch!"	Davison	Ugly God	2:25
8.	"L.D.C"	Davison	Ugly God	1:46
9.	"Like a Maverick"	Davison	HM Surf	2:50
10.	"Water"	Davison; Miguel Curtidor	Ugly God; Danny Wolf	2:19
Total length:				23:49

Sample credits

- "Welcome to the Booty Tape" contains a sample from "Mom Reacts to Ugly God" from YouTube personality Cufboys.
- "Bitch!" contains a sample from "Solid", performed by Duwap Kaine.

== Charts ==
Chart performance for The Booty Tape
Chart (2017)	Peak position
Dutch Albums (Album Top 100)	107
New Zealand Heatseeker Albums (RMNZ)	2
US Billboard 200	27
US Independent Albums (Billboard)	15
US Top R&B/Hip-Hop Albums (Billboard)	18
