= Bumps & Bruises =

Studio album by Ugly God
- Released: August 9, 2019
- Recorded: 2018–2019
- Genre: Hip hop
- Length: 30:56
- Label: Asylum

Ugly God chronology
Just a Lil Something Before the Album... (2018)	Bumps & Bruises (2019)

Singles from Bumps & Bruises
- 1. "Hello" Released: March 28, 2019; 2. "Lost in the Sauce" Released: May 10, 2019

Professional ratings
Review scores
Source	Rating
Pitchfork	3.5/10

Bumps & Bruises is the debut studio album by American rapper Ugly God. It was released on August 9, 2019. The album features guest appearances from Takeoff, Wintertime, and Lil Pump. The cover for the album was originally released on Instagram at the end of 2018.

== Release ==
Ugly God first teased the album in January 2018, when he tweeted the album artwork. He continued to tease this album and two other projects on February 20, 2018, saying

Bumps & Bruises is the debut album. 777 is my EP that will either drop right before or right after my album. It's Gonna Be One Ugly Winter is a collab EP with @wintertime. All of these are dropping within the next few months. Release dates coming soon.

On April 24, 2018, Ugly God posted an EP to his SoundCloud titled Just a Lil Something Before the Album... which served as a teaser for the album.

On October 19, 2018, Ugly God posted a trailer for the album on his Instagram. On December 14, 2018, Ugly God confirmed that the album would contain sixteen tracks.

On July 15, 2019, Ugly God announced that the album would officially be released on August 9, 2019, in addition to releasing another trailer. Two days later, he unveiled the track listing, revealing fourteen tracks with two featured artists.

On August 9, Ugly God released the album as a deluxe version, featuring two previously released singles, "Hello" (featuring Lil Pump) and "Lost in the Sauce". He promoted the album with an interview on the "Everyday Struggle" show, as well as having an Instagram Live with Wintertime (one of the features) moments before releasing the album. During initial promotion on the album, Ugly God implied rapper Lil Yachty would be featured, but this feature was not included on the album.

Producer Tay Keith assisted in production of the track "Batman". The track "Leave a Tip" was initially released in early 2018 with rapper Splash Drexler, it was re-released in the album without a feature.2

== Track listing ==
All tracks produced by Ugly God, except where noted.

No.	Title	Writer(s)	Producer(s)	Length
1.	"One Two"	Royce Rodriguez		1:54
2.	"Jaguar"	Rodriguez	ReeseyGotIt; Ugly God	2:34
3.	"For Real"	Rodriguez	Based1; Payday; Ugly God	1:42
4.	"Back to Basics"	Rodriguez		1:58
5.	"Hahaha!"	Rodriguez	Alto Britz	1:29
6.	"What's Up?"	Rodriguez	Payday; Ugly God	2:16
7.	"Bumps & Bruises" (interlude)	Rodriguez		1:58
8.	"Hold Up" (featuring Takeoff)	Rodriguez; Kirshnik Ball	Red Drum; Ugly God	2:45
9.	"Right Now"	Rodriguez		2:17
10.	"Batman"	Rodriguez; Brytavious Chambers	Tay Keith	2:53
11.	"History"	Rodriguez	Red Drum; Ugly God	1:52
12.	"Outer Space"	Rodriguez	ReeseyGotIt; Ugly God	1:55
13.	"Tell Me How You Feel" (featuring Wintertime)	Rodriguez		2:40
14.	"Leave a Tip"	Rodriguez	Nikko Bunkin	2:43
Total length:				30:56

Deluxe edition bonus tracks
No.	Title	Writer(s)	Producer(s)	Length
15.	"Hello" (featuring Lil Pump)	Rodriguez; Gazzy Garcia	Thank You Fizzle	2:45
16.	"Lost in the Sauce"	Rodriguez		1:57

== Charts ==
Chart (2019)	Peak position
US Billboard 200	46
