= Robert Waller (musician) =

American rapper, songwriter

- Also known as: EST
- Born: Philadelphia, Pennsylvania, U.S.
- Genres: R&B; hip-hop
- Occupations: Rapper; songwriter
- Labels: Notting Hill Music Publishing Group; Arista
- Formerly of: Three Times Dope

Robert Waller, also known as EST, is an American rapper and songwriter. He began his career as a member of Philadelphia-based hip hop collective Three Times Dope, who signed with Arista Records in the late 1980s. Waller then became known for his production and songwriting work, having contributed to the Destiny's Child album Destiny Fulfilled (2004), which was nominated for Best R&B Song at the 48th Annual Grammy Awards in 2006 with "Cater 2 U". He also worked with the group's lead member Beyoncé on her solo debut, Dangerously in Love (2003).

== Songwriting and production credits ==
Credits are courtesy of Discogs, Tidal, Apple Music, and AllMusic.

Title	Year	Artist	Album
"Let This Go"	2002	Eve	Eve-Olution
"Hey Y'all" (Featuring Snoop Dogg & Nate Dogg)	2002	Eve	Eve-Olution
"Baby Boy" (Featuring Sean Paul)	2003	Beyoncé	Dangerously in Love & Dutty Rock
"Naughty Girl"	2003	Beyoncé	Dangerously in Love
"Me, Myself and I"	2003	Beyoncé	Dangerously in Love
"I Know"	2003	Sarai	The Original
"You Could Never"	2003	Sarai	The Original
"L.I.F.E."	2003	Sarai	The Original
"Cater 2 U"	2004	Destiny's Child	Destiny Fulfilled
"Call The Cops"	2004	Mario	Turning Point
"Giving It Up For Love" (Unreleased)	2004	Britney Spears	The Original Doll (Shelved)
"Let's Get Away"	2005	Kieran Roberts	Breathe
"Get Personal"	2005	Marcos Hernandez	C About Me
"All The Ifs"	2005	Trey Songz	I Gotta Make It
"I'm Good"	2006	LeToya Luckett	LeToya
"Next Time"	2006	Brooke Hogan	Undiscovered
"Curtain Call" (Featuring Rick Ross)	2008	Nina Sky	Starting Today (Shelved)
"Like a Stripper" (Featuring Pleasure P & Shawty Putt)	2010	Lil Jon	Crunk Rock
"Let Her Know"	2011	Latif	Love Life
"24/7" (Featuring Ella Mai)	2018	Meek Mill	Championships
"Cocaine White" (Featuring Fat Joe)	2018	Freeway	Think Free
"All The Way Live"	2018	Freeway	Think Free

== Awards and nominations ==
Year	Awarding Body	Award	Result	Ref
2004	ASCAP Rhythm & Soul Music Awards	Top R&B/Hip-Hop Songs (Baby Boy)	Won	
2005	ASCAP Rhythm & Soul Music Awards	Top R&B/Hip-Hop Songs (Me, Myself and I)	Won	
2005	ASCAP Pop Awards	Most Performed Songs (Me, Myself and I)	Won	
2005	ASCAP Pop Awards	Most Performed Songs (Baby Boy)	Won	
2005	ASCAP Pop Awards	Most Performed Songs (Naughty Girl)	Won	
2006	48th Annual Grammy Awards	Grammy Award for Best R&B Song (Cater 2 U)	Nominated	
2006	ASCAP Rhythm & Soul Music Awards	Top R&B/Hip-Hop Songs (Cater 2 U)	Won	
2020	ASCAP Rhythm & Soul Music Awards	Top R&B/Hip-Hop Songs (24/7)	Won	
