= Entanet =

British wholesale internet service provider

Entanet International Limited
- Type: Subsidiary
- Industry: Internet service provider, telecommunications
- Founded: 1996; 30 years ago
- Founder: Jason Tsai
- Headquarters: Partnership House, Hollinswood Road, Telford, Shropshire, England, TF2 9TZ
- Area served: United Kingdom
- Key people: Tom O'Hagan (CEO)
- Products: Wholesale internet services, telecommunications
- Owner: Tom O'Hagan
- Website: enta.net

Entanet International Limited, stylised as entanet, is a British wholesale internet service provider (ISP), with its head office in Telford, Shropshire, England.

== History ==
Entanet was formed as a limited company in November 1996. Its founder and first chief executive officer (CEO) was Jason Tsai, who was awarded the title of Channel Entrepreneur of the Year by the Comms Business Awards in 2010.

In 2014, Mobeus Equity Partners made an initial £6 million investment to support a £14 million management buyout.

In July 2017, Entanet was acquired by CityFibre for £29 million.

In July 2026, Entanet was divested by CityFibre and acquired by Tom O'Hagan.

== Awards ==
Entanet has won a number of industry and marketing awards, including in 2018, the Comms Business Channel Supplier: Connectivity, and the Internet Service Providers Association (ISPA) Awards Best Wholesale ISP.
