= CityFibre =

British network provider

CityFibre Limited
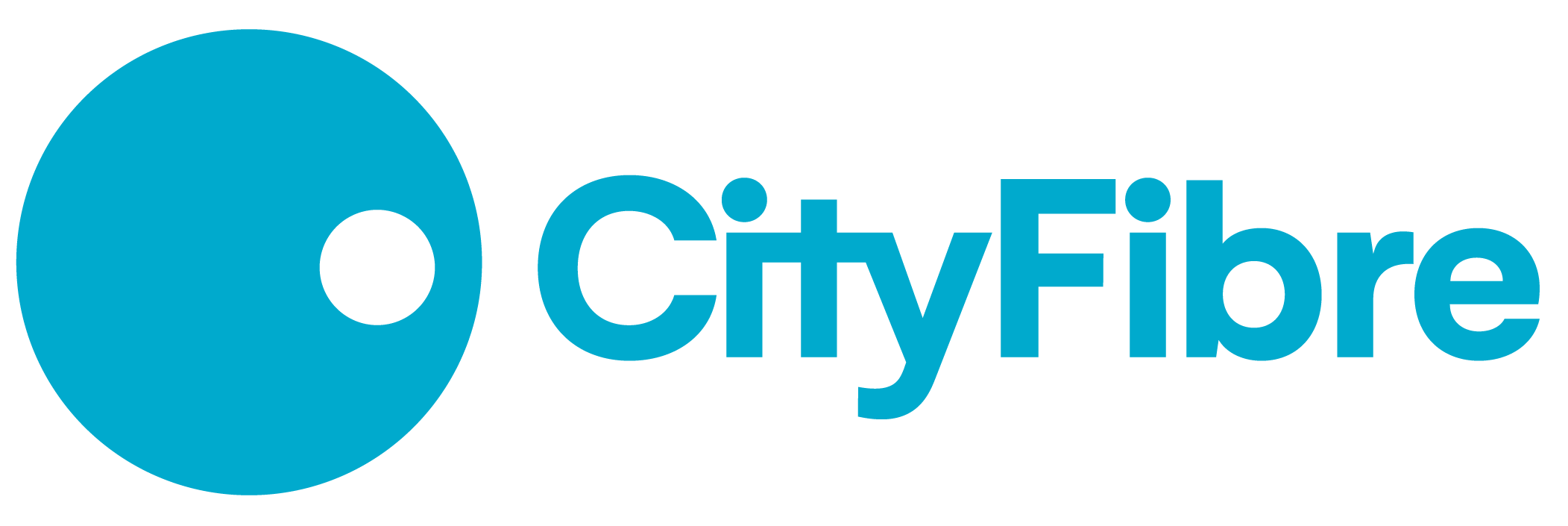
- Type: Subsidiary
- Industry: Fibre Broadband & Communications
- Founded: 11 January 2011; 15 years ago
- Founder: Greg Mesch; Mark Grahame
- Headquarters: London, England, UK
- Area served: United Kingdom
- Key people: Greg Mesch (CEO); Nick Dunn (CFO); Simon Holden (COO); John Franklin (CTO); Polly Weitzman (General Counsel)
- Products: Wholesale Fibre Broadband
- Revenue: ▼£31 million (2022)
- Net income: ▼ -£210 million (2023)
- Total assets: ▼£1.231 billion (2020)
- Number of employees: 1,900 (2023)
- Parent: CityFibre Networks Limited; CityFibre Holdings Limited; Cityfibre Infrastructure Holdings Limited; CityFibre Holdco Limited
- Subsidiaries: FibreCity Holdings Limited; FibreNation Limited; Lit Fibre Limited
- Website: cityfibre.com

CityFibre is an independent British telecommunications network provider, providing gigabit-capable FTTP broadband based in London, England. They are the third-largest network provider in the UK, after Openreach and Virgin Media. It is considered one of the UK's "altnets" (alternative network provider), in reference to being an alternative to Openreach.

== Overview ==
CityFibre is based in London, and is co-owned by Antin Infrastructure Partners, Goldman Sachs Asset Management, Mubadala Investment Company and Interogo Holding. The company was listed on London's Alternative Investment Market from 2014 to 2018.

The company has rapidly expanded across the UK, with a focus of expanding high-speed Internet access in "second-cities", locations that were otherwise neglected by competitors. Prior to CityFibre's investment, for example, the average Internet speed in Milton Keynes was 26.6 Mbit/s, 17.4 Mbit/s lower than the national average.

Over 35 Internet service providers use CityFibre for their network, including Andrews & Arnold, BrawBand, BrillBand, Entanet, Facto, FibreHop, Gigabit Networks, Giganet, IDNet, Link Broadband, No One, Octaplus, RunFibre, TalkTalk, toob, Vodafone, Yayzi, YouFibre, and Zen Internet.

== History ==
CityFibre was founded in 2011 by Greg Mesch. It became a publicly traded company in 2014.

In November 2014, CityFibre entered into a partnership with EE and Three to provide backhaul connections to mobile data masts.

In July 2017, CityFibre announced the acquisition of Entanet for £29 million.

In 2018, CityFibre announced that Connect Infrastructure Bidco Limited (a newly formed company indirectly jointly-controlled by a consortium formed by Antin Infrastructure Partners and West Street Infrastructure Partners, a fund managed by Goldman Sachs) had purchased a majority share in the company at 81 pence per share (a 92% premium of the public price of market close at 42 pence per share) and public trading of the company was cancelled on 22 June 2018 taking CityFibre into private ownership.

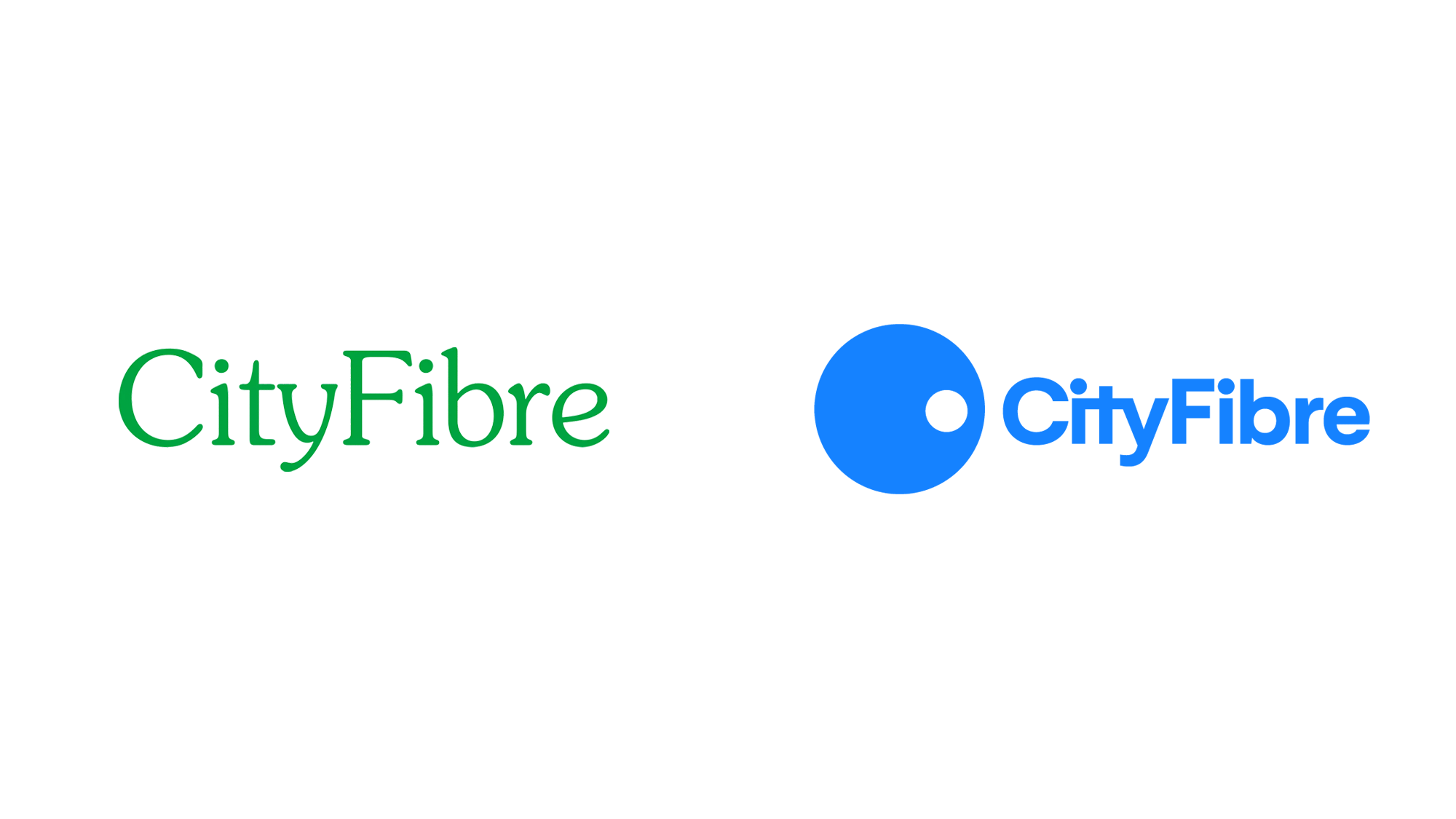
CityFibre logo comparison, before and after.

At the beginning of February 2023, the CEO Greg Mesch announced a company restructuring, blaming the UK's "struggling economy" causing rising costs for their business. As part of the restructuring 400 jobs would be cut from their 2,300 staff. At the time CityFibre reported they had 2.5 million properties connected to their network.

CityFibre initiated a fresh rebrand of the company colours and logo near the end of August 2023. With the target that the fresh bright colours raise awareness about full-fibre broadband and separate CityFibre from their Copper based competition. CityFibre says the design and colours were inspired by protest placards and signs as they target "Snail-paced" broadband providers.

CityFibre filed a complaint with Ofcom in May 2023, on how different fibre broadband products were being advertised to customers as "full-fibre broadband". This was successful with Ofcom ruling on 13 December that providers must use correct terminology for the type of fibre broadband they provide. Companies can not advertise their broadband service as full-fibre broadband unless the service is FTTP (Fibre-To-The-Property). This was done to combat the vast majority of broadband service providers selling FTTC (Fibre-To-The-Cabinet) as "full-fibre" when the final connection to the property is a copper coax cable or ADSL cable.

In July 2026, CityFibre announced the sale of Entanet to UK telecoms entrepreneur Tom O’Hagan, founder and former CEO of Virtual1, for an undisclosed sum.

== Fibre rollout ==
=== 2015 ===
In 2015, CityFibre purchased assets from Kcom, tripling the size of its high speed fibre network. The following year, CityFibre generated profit for the first time. At the time, its network covered "20% of the UK".

=== 2020 ===
From the early 2020s, CityFibre has been rapidly expanding its access across the UK, with plans to cover one-third of the country with gigabit Internet by 2025.

=== 2022 ===
In 2022, the company completed successful trials of 2 Gbit/s residential services in York, with further plans to increase speeds up-to 10 Gbit/s using XGS-PON technology.

In November 2022, CityFibre entered into partnership with the Internet service provider toob. In December, CityFibre filed a Competition Act complaint to the Competition and Markets Authority and Ofcom alleging that its competitor, Openreach, had attempted to suppress opposition.

=== 2023 ===
In 2023, CityFibre was awarded £69m in funding from the British government's Project Gigabit initiative, to help in expanding gigabit Internet access in rural properties across Cambridgeshire. They also secured funding for expansions into Hampshire, Suffolk, and Norfolk. In January, CityFibre reported that they were building at the rate of 22,000 premises per week, across 75 metropolitan areas, with a 83% increase in their network footprint from 2022.

In May, it was announced that TalkTalk would be using CityFibre networks for its business customers. In June, ISP Yayzi became the first ISP on the CityFibre network to offer up-to 2.5Gpbs to consumers, thanks to the usage of XGS-PON technology. Vodafone had previously offered 2 Gbit/s, however this was on a limited basis for trialing purposes. This offering was expanded in July, when CityFibre announced it was making a 2.5 Gbit/s broadband tier available to all of their retail ISPs.

=== 2024 ===
In January 2024, CityFibre completed laying 100 km of Fibre in and around Bury St Edmunds. Along with CityFibre's standard 1 Gbit fibre, this build also included CityFibre's new 10 Gbit fibre service, the full build reportedly cost CityFibre £8 million to complete. Completion of Bury St Edmunds pushed CityFibre over 3.5 million properties on their network.

In March Cityfibre publicly announced the company has acquired Lit Fibre with equity stock of the CityFibre company. With the addition of Lit Fibre network expands CityFibre's network with 300,000 properties in 20 towns across the UK, including 10 Gbit/s XGS-PON networking, adding these Lit Fibre connections the CityFibre's over 3.5 million properties already connected.
