= Ugly God =

American rapper (born 1996)

- Also known as: Pussy Bacon, Young Hermit Crab
- Born: Royce Cornell Davison-Rodriguez; September 19, 1996 (age 30); Fort Wayne, Indiana, U.S.
- Origin: Houston, Texas, U.S.
- Genre: Comedy hip hop
- Occupations: Rapper; songwriter; record producer
- Years active: 2015–unknown
- Label: Asylum

Royce Cornell Davison-Rodriguez (born September 19, 1996), better known by his stage name Ugly God, is an American rapper. He is best known for his 2016 single "Water", which peaked at number 80 on the Billboard Hot 100.

In June 2017, he was included on XXL's 2017 Freshman Class. He signed with Asylum Records to release his debut mixtape The Booty Tape (2017), followed by his debut studio album, Bumps & Bruises (2019), both of which entered the Billboard 200.

== Early life ==
Royce Cornell Davison-Rodriguez was born on September 19, 1996, in Fort Wayne, Indiana. Rodriguez would then move to the north side of Houston, Texas where he'd live for the majority of his life. He played basketball for the Gulfport High School basketball team in Gulfport, Mississippi. He was born to an Afro-Dominican father and an African-American mother. On his upbringing, He said, "My mom and dad divorced, so I was raised in the South as a black person. If you've been to Dominican Republic, you should know they have a lot of Spanish, dark Dominicans. They be Black as fuck just like me. My dad happened to be a Black Dominican and my mom's Black. African-Americans and Latinos have it rough in the U.S.—I'm both, so I guess I'm double rough." Davison-Rodriguez grew up speaking both Spanish and English.

== Career ==
=== 2015–2017: Career beginnings, "Water", and The Booty Tape ===
From 7th to 10th grade, he used the handle 'Pussy Bacon'. He changed his name to the famous 'Ugly God' because of social reasons, and his parents. He also states that he pioneered the name via improvisation when he exclaimed "I'm real Ugly", which evolved into 'Ugly God'.

On July 27, 2015, he released his viral song "I Beat My Meat" through his SoundCloud account. This song has garnered over 33 million views. This was his third time uploading the song after his high school basketball coach made him delete it in fear of scaring away basketball scholarships.

On March 16, 2016, he released his single titled "Water" on his SoundCloud account, before being released for digital download as a single on November 19, 2016, by Asylum Records. The song debuted at number 100 on the Billboard Hot 100, and later reached number 80 on the chart. "Water" peaked on the On-Demand Streaming Songs chart at No. 47 on February 11, 2017, it also peaked at No. 34 on the Hot R&B/Hip-Hop Songs chart.

In 2017, Ugly God received attention when he dropped a diss track targeted at himself named "Fuck Ugly God", which started when he tweeted "Fuck it. Im dropping an Ugly God disstrack tonight. Fuck that bitch ass nigga Ugly God. When I see him its on sight. Midnight eastern time." on June 26. The lyrics mostly concerned things that had happened in Ugly God's life which were used for roasting himself. According to Vincent Caruso of Prefix Magazine, the roasts ranged from "deceptively mild" to "abjectly ruthless" to "frighteningly personal". Within the song, Ugly God claims he was "jumped on Halloween" 4 years ago (2013), the song was also featured on his mixtape The Booty Tape. The song garnered over 15.5 million streams on SoundCloud. On August 4, 2017, Ugly God released his debut mixtape titled The Booty Tape. It charted at No. 27 on the Billboard 200.

=== 2018–present: "Boom!", Just a Lil Something Before the Album..., and Bumps & Bruises ===
Davison-Rodriguez was featured on the song "Boom!" by Lil Yachty, featured on the album Lil Boat 2, which was released on March 9, 2018. "Boom!" peaked at No. 88 on the Billboard Hot 100. Ugly God released the EP just a lil something before the album... ahead of his upcoming debut album, Bumps & Bruises. It was released on April 23, 2018, and consisted of 4 tracks: "Leave a Tip" (featuring Splash Dexter), "WeWantAllTheSmoke", "Bitch Where My Hug At", and "Tropics". It featured production from Nikko Bunkin, Shoki, and Red Drum. Ugly God also announced he would soon have two more projects released: Bumps & Bruises, which would be his debut album, and an EP named 777.

On March 27, 2019, Ugly God announced he would be releasing a single, saying he had not dropped anything in a "hot minute". At midnight Eastern Standard Time Ugly God released "Hello", featuring Lil Pump. On May 10, Ugly God released another single "Lost in the Sauce". with the music video coming out a day after on may 11. On July 13, he announced the release date for Bumps & Bruises and showed the tracklist on July 17. On August 9, Ugly God released Bumps & Bruises as well as the deluxe version. The original had 14 tracks, while the deluxe had 16, with two singles ("Hello" featuring Lil Pump and "Lost in the Sauce") as bonus tracks to the album. On an interview with the show Everyday Struggle, Ugly God said on the album's release "It actually feels amazing to actually drop a body of music that, you know, I worked and put my all into, and that I'm super comfortable with—it feels fuckin' good." Ugly God and producer Tay Keith collaborated on the song "Batman", which currently holds 782 thousand streams on SoundCloud. Ugly God worked with other producers such as Reddrum, Nikko Bunkin, and others. Ugly God and rapper Wintertime collaborated on the song "Tell Me How You Feel", which currently has 621 thousand SoundCloud streams. As the only other feature on the album, Ugly God worked with Takeoff of Migos on the song "Hold Up", which has garnered 3.5 million streams on Spotify. As of July 1, 2023, "Hello" and "Lost in the Sauce" have 5.1 million and 2.24 million streams on SoundCloud respectively.

== Personal life ==
Some time in late 2022, Ugly God's YouTube channel was hacked for an unspecified amount of time, causing all of the videos on the channel to be deleted.

=== Legal issues ===
In June 2023, Davison was arrested and charged with the murder of Renaldo Delavallade in Mississippi. In August of that year, Davison turned to social media to apparently address the accusations directed at him. He was released from custody in January 2024.

== Discography ==
=== Studio albums ===
List of studio albums, with chart positions
| Title | Details | Peak chart positions | |
| Title | Details | US | US R&B/HH |
|---|---|---|---|
| Bumps & Bruises | Released: August 9, 2019; Label: Asylum; Formats: Digital download, streaming | 46 | 28 |

=== Extended plays ===
List of extended plays
| Title | Details |
|---|---|
| Just a Lil Something Before the Album... | Released: April 24, 2018; Label: Self-released; Formats: Digital download, streaming |
| Two Piece | Released: May 29, 2023; Label: Self-released; Formats: Digital download, streaming |

=== Mixtapes ===
List of mixtapes, with chart positions
| Title | Details | Peak chart positions | | | |
| Title | Details | US | US R&B/HH | US Rap | US Ind. |
|---|---|---|---|---|---|
| The Booty Tape | Released: August 4, 2017; Label: Asylum; Formats: Digital download, streaming | 27 | 18 | 14 | 15 |
| UglyGoblin (with Rizzoo Rizzoo) | Released: January 3, 2020; Label: The Sauce Familia; Formats: Digital download, streaming | — | — | — | — |

=== Singles ===
List of singles, with selected chart positions, showing year released and album name
| Title | Year | Peak chart positions | | Certifications | Album |
| Title | Year | US | US R&B/HH | Certifications | Album |
|---|---|---|---|---|---|
| "I Beat My Meat" | 2016 | — | — | | Non-album single |
| "Water" | 2016 | 80 | 34 | RIAA: Platinum | The Booty Tape |
| "Fuck Ugly God" | 2017 | — | — | | The Booty Tape |
| "No Lies" | 2017 | — | — | | The Booty Tape |
| "Walter" (with Austin Makes Noises) | 2017 | — | — | | Non-album singles |
| "Lettetznow" | 2018 | — | — | | Non-album singles |
| "I'mma Dog" (featuring PnB Rock) | 2018 | — | — | | Non-album singles |
| "Hello" (featuring Lil Pump) | 2019 | — | — | | Bumps & Bruises |
| "Lost in the Sauce" | 2019 | — | — | | Bumps & Bruises |

=== Other charted songs ===
| Title | Year | Peak chart positions | | Certifications | Album |
| Title | Year | US | US R&B/HH | Certifications | Album |
|---|---|---|---|---|---|
| "Boom!" (Lil Yachty featuring Ugly God) | 2018 | 88 | 43 | RIAA: Gold | Lil Boat 2 |

=== Guest appearances ===
List of guest appearances, with other performing artists, showing year released and album name
| Title | Year | Artist(s) | Album |
|---|---|---|---|
| "Rari" | 2016 | Carnage, Lil Yachty, Famous Dex | —N/a |
| "Gang Shit" | 2016 | Lil Pump | —N/a |
| "New Glock" | 2016 | Famous Dex | Dexter the Robot |
| "Humble Yahself" | 2017 | Max P | —N/a |
| "Wya? (Remix)" | 2017 | Wifisfuneral | Boy Who Cried Wolf |
| "1Day" | 2017 | PnB Rock | Catch These Vibes |
| "Lied" | 2017 | DJ Flipp, Smokepurpp | —N/a |
| "Boom!" | 2018 | Lil Yachty | Lil Boat 2 |
| "Kathleen" | 2018 | Yung Gravy | Snow Cougar |
| "Let It Eat" | 2018 | Comethazine | Bawskee |
| "Chapter One" | 2019 | Wun Two | Pirata |
| "Chapter Two" | 2019 | Wun Two | Pirata |
| "Chapter Three" | 2019 | Wun Two | Pirata |
| "Chapter Four" | 2019 | Wun Two | Pirata |
| "Virgil" | 2020 | Casanova, Duke Deuce | N/A |
| ”FEO” | 2022 | Fat Nick | Hope You're Proud |
