= Legends of the Summer (EP) =

EP by Meek Mill
- Released: July 6, 2018
- Recorded: 2018
- Length: 13:44
- Label: Maybach Music; Atlantic
- Producer: Mike DZL; Hitmaka; Jahlil Beats; Pliznaya; Prince Chrishan

Meek Mill chronology
Wins & Losses (2017)	Legends of the Summer (2018)	Championships (2018)

Singles from Legends of the Summer
- 1. "Stay Woke" Released: June 26, 2018; 2. "Dangerous" Released: November 5, 2018

Legends of the Summer is the fifth extended play by American rapper Meek Mill. The EP was released on July 6, 2018, by Maybach Music Group and Atlantic Records. It is the follow-up to Meek Mill's third album Wins & Losses (2017), and his first project since his release from prison in April 2018. It includes guest appearances from Miguel, Swizz Beatz, PnB Rock and Jeremih. The production was handled by Hitmaka, Jahlil Beats, Mike DZL and Prince Chrishan, among others.

The EP was supported by one single: "Stay Woke" featuring Miguel.

== Background ==
On July 5, 2018, Meek Mill began teasing both the project's artwork and music.

== Singles ==
The EP's lead single "Stay Woke" was released on June 26, 2018. The song was performed with Miguel at the BET Awards on June 25, 2018.

== Reception ==
Professional ratings
Review scores
Source	Rating
HipHopDX	3.2/5
Pitchfork	7.2/10
Rolling Stone	3/5 stars

Legends of the Summer generally received mixed to positive reviews from music critics. Mosi Reeves of Rolling Stone wrote "Over a breezy 13 minutes, Meek Mill fills his listeners with hope that, yes, it is possible to survive and thrive in a country seemingly determined to deliver rough extrajudicial justice to people of color."

Scott from The Scott & Andre Show said "I thought it was pretty bad, I didn't enjoy listening to it...it was bland, it was unremarkable", and in a slightly more positive review, Andre said "I'm just gonna say it was mediocre. I agree...it was not very remarkable at all, but I thought the saving grace for it was the production".

== Commercial performance ==
Legends of the Summer debuted at number nine on the Billboard 200, earning 26,000 album-equivalent units, with 6,000 coming from pure album sales. It serves as Meek Mill's fifth top-ten album in the United States.

== Track listing ==
Credits adapted from ASCAP.

No.	Title	Writer(s)	Producer(s)	Length
1.	"Millidelphia" (featuring Swizz Beatz)	Robert Williams; Kasseem Dean; Leon Flowers; Jacquez Lowe	Pliznaya	3:35
2.	"Dangerous" (featuring Jeremih and PnB Rock)	Williams; Jeremih Felton; Rakim Allen; Christopher Dotson; Christian Ward; Gabrielle Nowee; Melvin Moore; Donald DeGrate	Prince Chrishan; Hitmaka	3:54
3.	"1AM"	Williams; Orlando Tucker; Dana Stinson; Kyambo Joshua; Dwight Grant; Shawn Carter	Jahlil Beats	2:43
4.	"Stay Woke" (featuring Miguel)	Williams; Miguel Pimentel; Michael Holmes; Guordan Banks; Clifton Chase; Edward Fletcher; Melvin Glover; Sylvia Robinson	Mike DZL	3:32
Total length:				13:44

Notes

- "1AM" contains a sample from "Do It Again (Put Ya Hands Up)", written by Dana Stinson, Kyambo Joshua, Dwight Grant and Shawn Carter, as performed by Jay-Z.
- "Stay Woke" contains a sample from "The Message", written by Clifton Chase, Edward Fletcher, Melvin Glover and Sylvia Robinson, as performed by Grandmaster Flash and the Furious Five.

== Personnel ==
- Jean-Marie Horvat – mixing (track 4)
- Dave Kutch – mastering (track 4)

== Charts ==
Chart (2018)	Peak position
Canadian Albums (Billboard)	37
US Billboard 200	9
US Top R&B/Hip-Hop Albums (Billboard)	8
