= On Me (Meek Mill song) =

2018 song by Meek Mill featuring Cardi B

Song by Meek Mill featuring Cardi B

from the album Championships
- Recorded: 2018
- Length: 3:45
- Label: Atlantic; Maybach Music
- Songwriters: Robert Williams; Nija Charles; Belcalis Almánzar; Shondrae Crawford; Desmond Peterson; Jovan J. Dawkins
- Producers: Bangladesh; Benny Wond3r; Jovan J. Dawkins

On Me is a song by American rapper Meek Mill featuring fellow American rapper Cardi B from his fourth studio album Championships (2018). It was written by the artists alongside Nija Charles, Shondrae Crawford, Desmond Peterson, and Jovan J. Dawkins, and produced by Bangladesh, Benny Wond3r, and Jovan J. Dawkins. Following the album release, the track entered the US Billboard Hot 100 at number 30 and was certified Gold by the Recording Industry Association of America (RIAA).

== Background ==
Producer Bangladesh first teased the collaboration in October 2018. A snippet of the song surfaced online the same month, previewing short parts from both Cardi and Meek's verses. HotNewHipHop described it as a "heavy, trap-influenced" track.

== Critical reception ==
Erin Lowers opined in Exclaim! that Cardi B "fleshes out the sex-adorned "On Me" flawlessly." Writing for Billboard, Sowmya Krishnamurthy called the song "energetic" and "[a] standout moment" on the album, which "features Cardi B stealing the show in perhaps her most confident rapping to date." In Pitchfork, Evan Rytlewski noticed Cardi B raps "exclusively in flexes on "On Me," and described the song as "a rowdy number cut from a distinctly "Bodak Yellow"-esque cloth." Reviewing the song's parent album Aaron McKrell of HipHopDX cited "On Me" and "Splash Warning" as examples of tracks where Meek "lightens the mood with carefree songs, and at best—like—he and his guests are supremely entertaining." Christopher R. Weingarten of Rolling Stone also cited it as one of the album's "straight bangers".

== Charts ==
Chart (2018)	Peak position
Canada Hot 100 (Billboard)	97
US Billboard Hot 100	30
US Hot R&B/Hip-Hop Songs (Billboard)	13

== Certifications ==
Region	Certification	Certified units/sales
United States (RIAA)	Gold	500,000^{‡}
^{‡} Sales+streaming figures based on certification alone.
