= I Like Girls (song) =

Single by PnB Rock featuring Lil Skies

Single by PnB Rock featuring Lil Skies

from the album TrapStar Turnt PopStar
- Released: March 21, 2019
- Length: 2:31
- Label: Atlantic
- Songwriters: Rakim Allen; Kimetrius Foose; Christian Ward; Christopher Dotson; Michael Williams II; Lars Hansen; James Foye III; IB Kornum; Austin Owens
- Producers: Hitmaka; Dotson; Ayo; Keyz

PnB Rock singles chronology
"Scenes" (2019)	"I Like Girls" (2019)	"Go to Mars" (2019)

Lil Skies singles chronology
"Side Swipe" (2019)	"I Like Girls" (2019)	"Death Note" (2019)

Music video
- "I Like Girls" on YouTube

"I Like Girls" is a song by American rapper PnB Rock featuring fellow American rapper Lil Skies. Produced by Hitmaka, Christopher Dotson, Ayo, and Keyz, it was released on March 21, 2019 as the third single from Rock's second studio album TrapStar Turnt PopStar (2019).

== Background ==
PnB Rock premiered the song on Zane Lowe's Beats 1 show. In regards to the song, he said, "It's pretty much universal, you know what I'm saying? Everybody like girls." In that interview, he also praised Lil Skies' vocabulary in music when talking about the collaboration.

== Critical reception ==
Aron A. of HotNewHipHop gave the song a "Very Hottt" rating and called it "an uptempo, bass-heavy banger for a certified anthem for freaky girls."

== Music video ==
A music video was released alongside the single. It was directed by Majik Films.

== Charts ==
Chart (2019)	Peak position
New Zealand Hot Singles (RMNZ)	39
US Bubbling Under Hot 100 (Billboard)	7
US Hot R&B/Hip-Hop Songs (Billboard)	48
US Rhythmic Airplay (Billboard)	27

== Certifications ==
Region	Certification	Certified units/sales
United States (RIAA)	Gold	500,000^{‡}
^{‡} Sales+streaming figures based on certification alone.
