= Water (Ugly God song) =

2016 single by Ugly God

Single by Ugly God

from the album The Booty Tape
- Released: November 18, 2016
- Recorded: 2015
- Genre: Dirty rap; trap
- Length: 2:20
- Label: Asylum
- Songwriters: Royce Davison; Miguel Curtidor
- Producers: Ugly God; Danny Wolf

Ugly God singles chronology
"I Beat My Meat" (2016)	"Water" (2016)	"Fuck Ugly God" (2017)

Original SoundCloud cover

Music video
- "Water" on YouTube

"Water" is the major label debut single by American rapper Ugly God. The song was premiered on March 16, 2016, on Ugly God's SoundCloud account, before being released for digital download as a single on November 18, 2016, by Asylum Records. It is the lead single from his debut mixtape The Booty Tape. The track was produced by Ugly God himself, along with Danny Wolf. The song currently has over 95,000,000 plays and counting since being uploaded onto SoundCloud. It also has 45,800,000 views on YouTube as of September 24, 2020. The official remix features American rapper Rich the Kid.

== Cover art ==
The original SoundCloud debut of "Water" borrows the album art from Atlanta-based Mood Rings' 2013 debut album, VPI Harmony. An original Pokémon-themed cover was eventually produced for the official release.

== Music video ==
The song and its accompanying music video premiered the same day on March 16, 2016, on Ugly God's YouTube account. The music video has over 40 million views.

== Commercial performance ==
"Water" debuted at number 100 on US Billboard Hot 100 for the chart dated January 21, 2017, before dropping out of the Hot 100 after four weeks. It is Ugly God's only solo single to chart, and the highest-peaking of his two appearances on the Hot 100 to date.

== Charts ==
Chart (2017)	Peak position
US Billboard Hot 100	80
US Hot R&B/Hip-Hop Songs (Billboard)	34

== Certifications ==
Region	Certification	Certified units/sales
United States (RIAA)	Platinum	1,000,000^{‡}
^{‡} Sales+streaming figures based on certification alone.
