= H20 =

H20 (H twenty) may refer to:

- Highway H20 (Ukraine)
- HMS H20, a submarine
- McDonnell XH-20 Little Henry, a type of helicopter
- H20, Nvidia GPU
- Nissan H20, a type of engine
- Xi'an H-20, a Chinese subsonic stealth bomber
- Halloween H20: 20 Years Later, a 1998 horror sequel
- H20, the ICD-10 code for uveitis

== See also ==
- H_{2}O (disambiguation)
