= Fibrecity Holdings =

- Company type: Subsidiary
- Industry: Telecommunications
- Founded: Leeds, West Yorkshire, England (2008); acquired by CityFibre Holidngs in 2011
- Headquarters: 271 Regent Street, London, England
- Key people: Elfed Thomas, Founder; Greg Mesch, CEO; Mark Collins, CCO
- Owner: CityFibre Holdings Limited
- Parent: CityFibre Holdings Limited
- Website: www.cityfibreholdings.com

Fibrecity Holdings was formerly owned by i3 Group and was acquired in a Management buyout in January 2011 by CityFibre Holdings Ltd following the collapse of FibreCity's principal lender Total Asset Finance.

i3 Group launched Fibrecity Holdings as a new high speed fibre optic infrastructure to be built in the UK and was also promised for overseas cities and metropolitan areas. It was said to provide connection speeds of 100 Mbit/s to homes, SMEs and educational facilities on the network. The network uses 'fibre to the home' (FTTH) technology.

The infrastructure build was started by i3 Group in Bournemouth in 2009 and this was to become the UK's first Fibrecity. The next UK Fibrecity was announced to be Dundee where work on installing the infrastructure was reported to have started in summer 2010.

i3 Group announced but ceased involvement with a Fibrecity project in Brisbane, Australia.

== Investigation ==
In the third quarter of 2010, concerns at the financial institution KBC Capital lead to an internal investigation into the circumstances around lending they had made to Fibrecity Holdings' principal funder Total Asset Limited (trading as Total Asset Finance, or TAF). This investigation quickly lead to the bank "..[obtaining] an injunction to freeze assets worth £24m belonging to Total Asset Finance and its sole director, Steve Dartnell..".

Subsequent to the collapse of TAF, Fibrecity builds were immediately ceased in Bournemouth leaving "more than 100 roads in Boscombe, Winton and Moordown [..] partly dug up as a result", and Dundee only shortly after works had started in the Scottish city.

With TAF unable to satisfy KBC that it was able to meet its obligations, KBC petitioned for the company Total Asset Limited to be placed into administration in December 2010. In February 2011, the appointed administrators of Total Asset Limited, Deloitte, published a report on the firm's activities which revealed the existence of a Serious Fraud Office investigation into TAFs financial dealings, stating that the SFO had entered the company's head office on the 17th of November 2010 to secure financial records.

The SFO investigation in Total Asset Finance eventually resulted in a five-month trial which concluded in February 2017 and found that four men had been involved in fraud on a "massive scale" in inflating or inventing contracts upon which lending was secured and saw Stephen Dartnell and George Alexander of Total Asset Finance, Carl Cumiskey of H2O, and Simon Mundy of KBC Lease (UK) Ltd each sentenced to substantial prison terms totalling some 44 years between them in February 2017 for their roles in the fraud amounting to almost £160m. , and were subsequently also each made the subject of confiscation orders during 2018 totalling some £1.4m.

== Restructure ==
In late April 2011, CityFibre Holdings announced that it had successfully restructured the business with the full consent of KBC Bank who also has a 5% option in CityFibre Holdings.

Since 5 April 2011, the Fibrecity website is unavailable as it is no longer operating as a customer facing company but forms part of CityFibre Holdings. The i3 Group website now says i3 is a worldwide technology licensing company rather than an infrastructure delivery and operation company as originally announced. It was reported on 7 June 2011 that i3 Group has gone into administration.

In mid-April 2011, it emerged that service to customers in Bournemouth had been suspended since the end of February. CityFibre Holdings are currently carrying out extensive repairs and testing of the network. Greg Mesch announced that 24,000 homes will be passed and ready for service by the end of the year. According to CityFibre its networks will guarantee minimum speeds of 100 Mbit/s up and downstream, increasing to 1 Gbit/s.
