= Catch These Vibes =

Studio album by PnB Rock
- Released: November 17, 2017
- Genres: Hip hop; trap; R&B
- Length: 61:03
- Label: Atlantic
- Producers: 2AM; 8 Bars; Antaveli; Apex Martin; Chef Pasquale; Dis; Donut; Earl on the Beat; G Koop; J.U.S.T.I.C.E. League; Jake One; Juan Ye; London on da Track; Marvlus Beats; Ness; Ray Lennon; Remy; Ronny J; Salman Abdi; Rubi Rosa; Slade da Monsta; Young Troy

PnB Rock chronology
GTTM: Goin Thru the Motions (2017)	Catch These Vibes (2017)	TrapStar Turnt PopStar (2019)

Singles from Catch These Vibes
- 1. "Feelins" Released: July 27, 2017; 2. "Issues" Released: October 27, 2017

Catch These Vibes is the debut studio album by American rapper PnB Rock. It was released on November 17, 2017, by Atlantic Records. It features guest appearances from Wiz Khalifa, Juicy J, Roy Woods and Smokepurpp, among others. It is preceded by two singles; "Feelins" and "Issues" featuring Russ.

== Background ==
On September 20, 2017, the album's title and cover art was revealed by PnB Rock via Twitter. The album's tracklist and release date was revealed on October 27, 2017, along with the album's second single.

== Singles ==
The album's lead single, "Feelins" was released on July 27, 2017. The album's second single, "Issues" featuring Russ was released on October 27, 2017.

On November 10, 2017, "Scrub" was released as a promotional single.

== Promotion ==
=== Tour ===
On January 6, 2018, PnB Rock announced an official headlining concert tour to further promote the album titled Catch These Vibes Tour. The tour began on February 7, 2018, in New Haven, at Toad's Place. He was supported by rapper Lil Baby.

Tour dates
Date	City	Venue
North America
February 7, 2018	New Haven	Toad's Place
February 8, 2018	Boston	Paradise Rock Club
February 10, 2018	Detroit	Majestic Theater
February 11, 2018	Milwaukee	The Rave/Eagles Club
February 12, 2018	Chicago	House of Blues Chicago
February 13, 2018	St. Louis	Delmar Hall
February 15, 2018	Minneapolis	Varsity Theater
February 17, 2018	Englewood	Gothic Theatre
February 18, 2018	Salt Lake City	The Complex
February 20, 2018	Eugene	McDonald Theatre
February 21, 2018	Seattle	Showbox SoDo
February 23, 2018	San Francisco	Social Hall SF
February 24, 2018	Sacramento	Ace of Spades
February 25, 2018	Santa Ana	The Observatory
February 28, 2018	Los Angeles	The Novo by Microsoft
March 2, 2018	Albuquerque	The Historic El Rey Theater
March 4, 2018	Dallas	House of Blues Dallas
March 5, 2018	Houston	Warehouse Live
March 7, 2018	Atlanta	Buckhead Theatre
March 8, 2018	Greensboro	Cone Denim Entertainment Center
March 11, 2018	Baltimore	Baltimore Soundstage
March 13, 2018	Norfolk	Norva Theatre
March 14, 2018	New York City	Irving Plaza
March 15, 2018	Montclair	The Wellmont Theater
March 16, 2018	Phoenix	Pot of Gold Music Festival

== Track listing ==
No.	Title	Writer(s)	Producer(s)	Length
1.	"Friends"	Rakim Allen; Marques Motley	Marvlus Beats	3:47
2.	"London"	Allen; London Holmes	London on da Track	3:24
3.	"Face"	Allen; Jason Patterson; Orlando Wharton	Remy	3:20
4.	"Scrub"	Allen; Patterson; Wharton; Carlos Garcia; Violet Smith	Remy	3:32
5.	"Lovin'" (featuring A Boogie wit da Hoodie)	Allen; Artist Dubose; Erik Ortiz; Kevin Crowe; Jason Carr; Jacob Dutton; Robert Mandell	J.U.S.T.I.C.E. League; 8 Bars; Jake One; G Koop	3:30
6.	"Issues" (featuring Russ)	Allen; Russell Vitale; Courtney Clyburn; Cameron Shaikh; Tatiauna Matthews	Ness; Chef Pasquale	3:52
7.	"Lowkey" (featuring Roy Woods and 24hrs)	Allen; Denzel Spencer; Robert Davis; Sean Stein; Asten Harris	Dis; Apex Martin	3:20
8.	"iRun" (featuring Lil Yachty)	Allen; Miles McCollum; Isaac Bynum	Earl on the Beat	4:06
9.	"TTM" (featuring Wiz Khalifa and Nghtmre)	Allen; Cameron Thomaz; Tyler Marenyi; Aaron Zuckerman; Grace Mitchell	Nghtmre	3:32
10.	"WTS"	Allen; John Hyszko; Garcia	Young Troy	3:16
11.	"3X" (featuring Smokepurpp)	Allen; Omar Pineiro; Ronald Spence, Jr.	Ronny J	3:27
12.	"Voicememowav.4"	Allen	Antaveli	2:29
13.	"Pressure"	Allen; Marcus Slade	Slade da Monsta	3:40
14.	"Coupe"	Allen; Brandon Bell	Donut	2:16
15.	"Confide" (featuring Juicy J)	Allen; Jordan Houston; Samuel Jimenez; Nima Jahanbin; Paimon Jahanbin; Garcia	Smash David; Wallis Lane	2:42
16.	"1Day" (featuring Ugly God)	Allen; Royce Davison; Luis Bello; Salman Abdi; SAl Diesel	Rubi Rosa	3:08
17.	"Feelins"	Allen; Raymon Lennon; Duane Coleman; Matthews; Garcia; Etterlene Jordan; William DeBarge; Eldra DeBarge	Ray Lennon; Juan Ye	3:41
18.	"Rewind"	Allen; Jaime Lepe; Francisco Ramirez; Jared Macintyre; Patterson	Cash Passion; Frankie Ramirez; 2AM; Remy	4:01
Total length:				61:03

Notes

- "Voicememowav.4" is stylized as "VOICEMEMOWAV.4"
- "WTS" features additional vocals by Semii
- "London" features additional vocals by LouGotCash

Sample credits

- "Feelins" contains a sample from "I Like It", written by Etterlene Jordan, William DeBarge and Eldra DeBarge, as performed by DeBarge.

== Charts ==
=== Weekly charts ===
Chart (2017–18)	Peak position
Canadian Albums (Billboard)	66
US Billboard 200	17
US Top R&B/Hip-Hop Albums (Billboard)	7

=== Year-end charts ===
Chart (2018)	Position
US Top R&B/Hip-Hop Albums (Billboard)	95
