= GTTM: Goin Thru the Motions =

Mixtape by PnB Rock
- Released: January 13, 2017
- Recorded: 2016
- Genre: Hip-hop; trap; R&B
- Length: 51:29
- Label: Empire; Atlantic
- Producer: Mont Kearny (exec.); 12Keyz; Akachi; Austin Powerz; Bizzy Genius; Cubeatz; Diego Ave; Donut; DP Beats; J Gramm; K Beatz; Kountdown; Maaly Raw; Murda Beatz; Needlz; Reefa; Scott Storch; Sonny Digital; Slade da Monsta; Swiff D

PnB Rock chronology
Money, Hoes, & Flows (2016)	GTTM: Goin Thru the Motions (2017)	Catch These Vibes (2017)

Singles from GTTM: Goin Thru the Motions
- 1. "Selfish" Released: June 23, 2016; 2. "Playa No More" Released: December 2, 2016; 3. "New Day" Released: December 16, 2016

Professional ratings
Review scores
Source	Rating
PopMatters	5/10
Pitchfork	6.6/10
XXL	3/5 (L)

GTTM: Goin Thru the Motions is the fourth mixtape by American rapper PnB Rock. It was released on January 13, 2017, by Empire Distribution and Atlantic Records. Originally marketed as the rapper's debut studio album, Rock later announced that his official debut studio album is the upcoming Catch These Vibes project, presumably meaning that GTTM: Going Thru the Motions is truly a mixtape.

The mixtape features guest appearances from Wiz Khalifa, YFN Lucci, A Boogie wit da Hoodie, Quavo and Ty Dolla Sign, while the production was handled by Donut, DP Beats, J Gramm, Maaly Raw, Murda Beatz, Needlz, Reefa, 12Keyz and Scott Storch, among others. The album was supported by three singles: "Selfish", "Playa No More" and "New Day".

== Singles ==
The mixtapes's lead single, "Selfish", was released on June 23, 2016. The song was produced by Donut and Needlz.

The mixtapes's second single, "Playa No More", was released on December 2, 2016. The song features guest appearances from American rappers A Boogie wit da Hoodie and Quavo.

The mixtape's third single, "New Day", was released on December 16, 2016.

== Track listing ==
No.	Title	Writer(s)	Producer(s)	Length
1.	"Attention" (featuring Wiz Khalifa)	Rakim Allen; Brandon Bell; Carlos Garcia; Cameron Thomaz	Donut	3:55
2.	"There She Go" (featuring YFN Lucci)	Rakim Allen; Kevin Andre; Rayshawn Bennett; Louis Elveus	Bizzy Genius	3:46
3.	"Playa No More" (featuring A Boogie wit da Hoodie and Quavo)	Allen; Steve Thornton; Artist Dubose; Quavious Marshall	Swiff D	3:12
4.	"Selfish"	Allen; Bell; Khari Cain	Donut; Needlz	4:05
5.	"Plans"	Allen; Don Paschall, Jr.; Carlos Garcia	DP Beats; Akachi^{[a]}	3:10
6.	"Range Rover"	Allen; Carlos Garcia; Scott Storch; Sonny Uwaezuoke; Diego Avendaño	Sonny Digital; Storch; Diego Ave	2:59
7.	"Notice Me"	Allen; Julian Gramma; Dylan Krell	J Gramm; Dez Wright	3:29
8.	"Hanging Up My Jersey" (featuring Ty Dolla Sign)	Allen; Sharif Slater; Kibwe Luke; Tyrone Griffin, Jr.	Reefa; 12Keyz	3:30
9.	"Smile"	Allen; Austin Schindler; Kyle Abacan; Anthony Norris; Derek Tucker	Austin Powerz; K-Beatz; Lee on the Beats; Kountdown	4:26
10.	"Misunderstood"	Allen; Marcus Slade; Carlos Garcia	Slade da Monsta	4:08
11.	"Heart Racin'"	Allen; Slade	Slade da Monsta	4:36
12.	"Questions"	Allen; Bell	Donut	3:25
13.	"New Day"	Allen; Jamaal Henry	Maaly Raw	3:09
14.	"Stand Back" (featuring A Boogie wit da Hoodie)	Allen; Dubose; Kevin Gomringer; Tim Gomringer; Shane Lindstrom	Murda Beatz; Cubeatz	3:27
Total length:				51:17

Track notes

- ^{^[a]} signifies a co-producer

Sample credits

- "Hanging Up My Jersey" contains samples from "I Can't Sleep Baby (If I)", performed by R. Kelly.
- "Smile" contains samples from "Girl You Can Leave", performed by Jagged Edge.

== Charts ==
=== Weekly charts ===
Chart (2017)	Peak position
US Billboard 200	28
US Top R&B/Hip-Hop Albums (Billboard)	10

=== Year-end charts ===
Chart (2017)	Position
US Billboard 200	122
US Top R&B/Hip-Hop Albums (Billboard)	62

== Certifications ==
Region	Certification	Certified units/sales
United States (RIAA)	Gold	500,000^{‡}
^{‡} Sales+streaming figures based on certification alone.
