= Dangerous (Meek Mill song) =

2018 song by Meek Mill

Single by Meek Mill featuring Jeremih and PnB Rock

from the album Legends of the Summer and Championships
- Released: November 5, 2018
- Genre: Hip hop; R&B
- Length: 3:53
- Label: Maybach Music; Atlantic
- Songwriters: Christopher Dotson; James Artissen; Gabrielle "Goldiie" Nowee; Christian Ward; Rakim Allen; Jeremih Felton; Robert Williams
- Producers: Prince Chrishan; Hitmaka

Meek Mill singles chronology
"Stay Woke" (2018)	"Dangerous" (2018)	"Going Bad" (2019)

Jeremih singles chronology
"Goin Thru Some Thangz" (2018)	"Dangerous" (2018)	"You Stay" (2019)

PnB Rock singles chronology
"Nowadays" (2018)	"Dangerous" (2018)	"I Like Girls" (2019)

Music video
- "Dangerous" on YouTube

"Dangerous" is a song by American rapper Meek Mill featuring Jeremih and PnB Rock. It appears on Meek Mill's EP Legends of the Summer and his album Championships. The song samples "Come and Talk to Me" by American R&B group Jodeci.

== Background ==
The song originally appeared on Meek Mill's fifth extended play, Legends of the Summer, which was released on July 6, 2018. On November 5, 2018, it was released as the second single from the EP. Later that month, it also served as the lead single from his fourth studio album Championships, released on November 25.

== Remix ==
On June 13, 2019, American R&B singer Trey Songz released a remix of the song.

== Music video ==
The song's music video premiered on October 30, 2018, and has over 66 million views as of February 2020.

== Charts ==
=== Weekly charts ===
Chart (2018)	Peak position
US Billboard Hot 100	31
US Hot R&B/Hip-Hop Songs (Billboard)	18
US Rhythmic Airplay (Billboard)	12

=== Year-end charts ===
Chart (2018)	Position
US Hot R&B/Hip-Hop Songs (Billboard)	97
Chart (2019)	Position
US Hot R&B/Hip-Hop Songs (Billboard)	86

== Certifications ==
Region	Certification	Certified units/sales
New Zealand (RMNZ)	Platinum	30,000^{‡}
United Kingdom (BPI)	Silver	200,000^{‡}
United States (RIAA)	Platinum	1,000,000^{‡}
^{‡} Sales+streaming figures based on certification alone.
