= Broadwater Energy =

- Location within New York Broadwater Energy (the United States)

General information
- Type: Proposed Liquified Natural Gas Terminal
- Location: Riverhead (town), New York, New York, United States
- Coordinates: 41°06′2.87″N 72°50′44.56″W
- Owner: TransCanada Corporation and Shell Oil

Website
- www.broadwaterenergy.com

Broadwater Energy was a Liquefied Natural Gas Terminal proposed to be built in Long Island Sound between New York State and Connecticut. The project received vociferous objections from Connecticut officials and some New York state officials.

New York state officials had yet to decide whether to issue permits for the project as of March 2008, and Governor David Paterson said he might postpone a decision, originally scheduled to be made in April 2008 on whether to support the terminal. The terminal received federal approval from the Federal Energy Regulatory Commission on March 21, 2008, but energy analysts have said that state rather than regulators generally have the decisive role in deciding whether liquefied natural gas terminals may be built.

It is to be operated by Broadwater Energy L.L.C., a joint venture by TransCanada Corporation and Shell Oil for the transfer of liquefied natural gas from ships to pipelines. The proposed floating unit would be about nine miles (14 km) north of Wading River, New York and 10 miles (16 km) south of New Haven, Connecticut – the widest point in the Sound. After being unloaded, the liquefied gas would be warmed back into a gas and pumped through pipelines (with the specific pipeline on the bottom of the sound called the "Iroquois Gas Transmission." The company calls the term a "Floating Storage Regasification Unit," or FSRU. It is expected 1 billion cubic feet (28,000,000 m^{3}) of natural gas per day into the pipeline.

The terminal would be about 1,200 feet (370 m) long and 180 feet (55 m) wide and would rise about 75 to 80 feet (24 m) above the water. It would have the capability to stockpile eight billion cubic feet of gas. The project also involves the laying of a 22-mile (35 km) long pipeline from the platform to the Iroquois line (off the shore the village of Nissequogue, New York).

Broadwater's website notes advantages to consumers of cutting the cost of natural gas, cleaner fuel than oil, and the lack requirements to build onshore.

The State of New York which has territorial jurisdiction over the sound will have ultimate decisions on whether it will permit the project. Broadwater says on its website the project if built on plan between 2009 and 2010 would cost $20 million directly.

== Opposition ==
The project, which will be located off the coast of expensive residential property on eastern Long Island and eastern Connecticut, has stirred considerable local opposition including New York Senators, Charles E. Schumer and Hillary Clinton, and Representative Tim Bishop. Clinton said:

I, like many Long Islanders, remain concerned that the security risks and environmental threats posed by the project have not been properly addressed. I also share the view held by many Long Islanders that this project would have detrimental impacts on the quality of water and air surrounding the sound.

Among the controversiesis concern that legislation may pass that would permit the Federal Energy Regulatory Commission to override local opposition.

New York Governor Eliot Spitzer, who resigned from office in March 2008 and was replaced by David Paterson, took no position on the project but raised eyebrows in November 2007 when he hired Bruce Gyory, a Broadwater lobbyist, to advise the governor.

== Decision ==
On April 10, 2008, Governor Paterson rejects the Broadwater plan, stating at a Press Conference at Sunken Meadow State Park that it "Is not what Long Island Sound needs." Broadwater however does have the right to appeal to the US Department of Commerce.

== Timeline ==
- January 2008 — Staff of the Federal Energy Regulatory Commission concludes the project will have only limited environmental impact.
- January 10, 2008 — U.S. General Accounting Office released a report on the U.S. Coast Guard's ability to provide security for the terminals and involved ships.
- January 16, 2008 — Connecticut Governor M. Jodi Rell writes to New York Governor Spitzer that the plant would hurt the Sound.
- March 20, 2008 — Federal Energy Regulatory Commission votes 5–0 to approve the project.
- April 10, 2008 — New York Governor David Paterson officially rejects the Broadwater plan altogether.
