= TrapStar Turnt PopStar =

Studio album by PnB Rock
- Released: May 3, 2019
- Length: 53:00
- Label: Atlantic
- Producer: 1Mind; 30 Roc; Abaz; Allen Ritter; Austin Powerz; Ayo; Bkorn; Cardo; CVRE; DatKidChris; Dez Wright; DJ Frank E; Diplo; Frank Dukes; G. Ry; Hitmaka; Johnny Yukon; K-Mack; Keyz; King Henry; Mally Mall; Musik MajorX; Niaggi; Nick Mira; Nick Fouryn; OG Parker; Pro Logic; ProdByAJ; Ray Lennon; Remy; Rex Kudo; RichieMoe; Sevn Thomas; SkipOnDaBeat; Smash Bros; Smash David; Tariq Beats; Taz Taylor; X-Plosive

PnB Rock chronology
Catch These Vibes (2017)	TrapStar Turnt PopStar (2019)	2 Get You Thru the Rain (2021)

Singles from TrapStar Turnt PopStar
- 1. "ABCD (Friend Zone)"/"Nowadays" Released: July 30, 2018; 2. "I Like Girls" Released: March 21, 2019; 3. "Go To Mars" Released: April 11, 2019

Professional ratings
Review scores
Source	Rating
AllMusic	3/5 stars

TrapStar Turnt PopStar is the second studio album by American rapper PnB Rock. The last album to be released during his lifetime, it was released as a double album on May 3, 2019, through Atlantic Records. It features guest appearances from the late XXXTentacion, Lil Durk, Tee Grizzley, Quavo, Mally Mall, Diplo, Lil Skies, Tory Lanez, and A Boogie wit da Hoodie. The deluxe edition of the album was released three days later on May 6, 2019. It features additional guest appearances from Lil Wayne, Roddy Ricch, and YoungBoy Never Broke Again. The album debuted at number four on the US Billboard 200.

== Background ==
The album is split into two sides; The TrapStar and The PopStar; the former "focuses more on his humbling upbringing in the skin-toughening streets of Philly", whereas the latter "showcases the life he lives now as he finally celebrates and enjoys the fruits of his labor". PnB Rock stated that he wanted to do a double album "so you get both sides of me. That was me then, and this is me now. You know, you see the growth and the level up." He also held a listening party for the album in Philadelphia.

== Commercial performance ==
TrapStar Turnt PopStar debuted at number four on the US Billboard 200 with 42,000 album-equivalent units (including 2,000 pure album sales) in its first week. It is PnB Rock's first US top ten debut. The album also accumulated a total of 45.73 million on-demand audio streams for its songs in its debut week.

== Track listing ==
The TrapStar
No.	Title	Writer(s)	Producer(s)	Length
1.	"Dreamin'"	Rakim Allen; Maurice Walker	RichyMoe; ProdByAJ	2:38
2.	"I Need More"	R. Allen; Samuel Jimenez; Chrishan Ward; Nicholas Baker; Jordan Holt-May	Smash David; Hitmaka; Nick Fouryn	2:59
3.	"Deez Streets" (featuring Lil Durk)	R. Allen; Durk Banks; Andrew Franklin; Brandon Korn	Pro Logic; Bkorn	2:37
4.	"Go to Mars" (featuring Tee Grizzley)	R. Allen; Terry Wallace, Jr.; Edgar Ferrera	SkipOnDaBeat	2:31
5.	"Penny Proud"	R. Allen; Peter Kim; Nicholas Cavalieri	Smash Bros	2:39
6.	"Middle Child" (with XXXTentacion)	R. Allen; Jahseh Onfroy; DatKidChris	DatKidChris	2:31
7.	"Fuck Up the City" (featuring Quavo and Mally Mall)	R. Allen; Quavious Marshall; Jamal Rashid; Ronald LaTour	Mally Mall; Cardo^{[a]}	3:36
8.	"Nowadays"	R. Allen; Gianni van den Brom	Niaggi	3:04
9.	"Now or Never 2.0"	R. Allen; Kim; Cavalieri; Craig Gordwin; Steven Mancebo; Timothy Parks	Smash Bros	3:35

The PopStar
No.	Title	Writer(s)	Producer(s)	Length
1.	"Swervin'" (featuring Diplo)	R. Allen; Thomas Pentz; Henry Allen; Melvin Riley	Diplo; King Henry	3:05
2.	"I Like Girls" (featuring Lil Skies)	R. Allen; Kimetrius Foose; Ward; Christopher Dotson; Michael Williams II; Lars Hansen; James Foye III; IB Kornum; Austin Owens	Hitmaka; Ayo; Keyz; Blk Mic	2:31
3.	"All These Bandz" (featuring Tory Lanez)	R. Allen; Daystar Peterson; Austin Schindler; Dylan Cleary-Krell; Franklin	Austin Powerz; Dez Wright; Pro Logic	3:04
4.	"Put You On" (featuring A Boogie wit da Hoodie)	R. Allen; Artist Dubose; Samuel Gloade; Imran Abbas; Lamont Porter	30 Roc; Abaz; X-Plosive	2:59
5.	"Stage Fright"	R. Allen; Rupert Thomas, Jr.; Franklin	Sevn Thomas; Pro Logic	3:31
6.	"Choosin"	R. Allen; Joshua Parker; Ryan Martinez; Sebastian Lopez; Christopher Kim; Terrence Williams	OG Parker; 1Mind; G. Ry; CVRE	3:16
7.	"My Ex"	R. Allen; Jason Patterson	Remy	2:50
8.	"ABCD (Friend Zone)"	R. Allen; Ward	Hitmaka; Musik MajorX; Tariq Beats	2:44
9.	"How It Feels"	R. Allen; Tremaine Neverson; Nija Charles; Eric Bellinger, Jr.; Dernst Emile; Karriem Mack; Raymon Lennon; Tatiauna Matthews	K-Mack; Ray Lennon	3:16

Deluxe edition bonus tracks
No.	Title	Writer(s)	Producer(s)	Length
1.	"T-Shirt" (featuring Lil Wayne)	R. Allen; Dwayne Carter, Jr.; Justin Franks; John Mitchell; Daniel Kyriakides	DJ Frank E; Johnny Yukon	3:14
2.	"Me & U"	R. Allen; Patterson	Remy	2:55
3.	"Evolved" (featuring Roddy Ricch)	R. Allen; Rodrick Moore, Jr.; Patterson	Remy	3:04
4.	"Take My Soul" (featuring YoungBoy Never Broke Again)	R. Allen; Kentrell Gaulden; Nicholas Mira; Danny Snodgrass, Jr.; Adam Feeney	Nick Mira; Taz Taylor; Frank Dukes; CVRE	2:42
5.	"HMP"	R. Allen; Allen Ritter; Masamune Kudo	Ritter; Rex Kudo	3:03

Notes

- ^{^[a]} signifies an original producer

== Charts ==
=== Weekly charts ===
Chart (2019)	Peak position
Canadian Albums (Billboard)	14
Dutch Albums (Album Top 100)	73
US Billboard 200	4
US Top R&B/Hip-Hop Albums (Billboard)	2

=== Year-end charts ===
Chart (2019)	Position
US Top R&B/Hip-Hop Albums (Billboard)	94
