= Selfish (PnB Rock song) =

Single by PnB Rock

from the album GTTM: Goin Thru the Motions
- Released: June 23, 2016
- Recorded: 2016
- Genre: Hip hop; R&B
- Length: 4:05
- Label: Atlantic
- Songwriters: Rakim Allen; Brandon Bell; Khari Cain; Liana Banks
- Producers: Needlz; Donut

PnB Rock singles chronology
| "Fleek" (2015) | "Selfish" (2016) | "Everyday We Lit" (2016) |

Music video
- "Selfish" on YouTube

"Selfish" is a song by American hip hop recording artist PnB Rock. It was released on June 23, 2016 by Atlantic Records and serves as the lead single from his mixtape GTTM: Goin Thru the Motions. The song was produced by Needlz and Donut.

== Background ==
While talking about the song in an interview with The Fader, Rock said:

"I wrote this song about one specific girl who I was chilling with in the studio. This song really started as me just singing to her, being smooth and shit. I didn't think anything of it until it was stuck in my head so I had to get in the booth and record it. It's funny because I don't even speak to the girl anymore."

== Critical reception ==
David Drake of Complex wrote that this song is "as sincere as "Trap Queen," and "as attuned to the vulnerability of love, but rather than striding through the airwaves towards No. 1, it seduces, earning your trust over time".

== Music video ==
The song's accompanying music video premiered on December 17, 2016 on PnB Rock's account on YouTube.

== Charts ==
=== Weekly charts ===
2016–2017 weekly chart performance for "Selfish"
| Chart (2016–2017) | Peak position |
|---|---|
| US Billboard Hot 100 | 51 |
| US Hot R&B/Hip-Hop Songs (Billboard) | 21 |

2022 weekly chart performance for "Selfish"
| Chart (2022) | Peak position |
|---|---|
| New Zealand Hot Singles (RMNZ) | 13 |
| US Hot R&B/Hip-Hop Songs (Billboard) | 17 |

=== Year-end charts ===
Year-end chart performance for "Selfish"
| Chart (2017) | Position |
|---|---|
| US Hot R&B/Hip-Hop Songs (Billboard) | 80 |

== Certifications ==
Certifications for "Selfish"
| Region | Certification | Certified units/sales |
|---|---|---|
| United Kingdom (BPI) | Silver | 200,000^{‡} |
| United States (RIAA) | 3× Platinum | 3,000,000^{‡} |
^{‡} Sales+streaming figures based on certification alone.
