= Broadwater Green =

Council/ Private estate in Thamesmead London

Coordinates: 51.4938°N 0.0853°E

Broadwater Green is a mixed council/private estate in Thamesmead, London. It was originally only two long roads, but since 1999 has grown into a very large estate. Unlike many council estates, there are no towerblocks in Broadwater Green. It has been commonly referred to as "The Yellow Brick Houses" by local residents in the immediate vicinity. There is a restaurant/public house named "The Princess Alice" at the entrance to the estate.

Broadwater Green was built on the Royal Arsenal, just off the shore of the Thames River, and directly opposite of Belmarsh Prison. It is part of the Royal Borough of Greenwich.
