= Sowmya Krishnamurthy =

American author and music journalist (born 1983)

- Occupations: Music journalist and author
- Writing career
- Subject: Hip-Hop
- Website: www.sowmya-krishnamurthy.com

Sowmya Krishnamurthy is an American music journalist and author. She has contributed to Time, Rolling Stone, XXL, Complex, Billboard, Playboy and NPR. Sowmya is the author of Fashion Killa: How Hip-Hop Revolutionized High Fashion and The Blueprint: Inside the Business of Roc-A-Fella Records.

== Career ==
Krishnamurthy began her writing career at The Michigan Daily. She interned at CNN and Bad Boy Records and was in William Morris Endeavor's agent training program. In 2012, she starred on MTV's Hip-Hop POV with Charlamagne Tha God and Amanda Seales. Sowmya has appeared on MSNBC, BBC, and CNN. In 2021, she launched The Lookout by SoundCloud on SiriusXM.

She has provided commentary on The Breakfast Club and Ebro in the Morning. She is one of Complex's "25 Music Insiders to Follow on Twitter" with other journalists Elliott Wilson and Charlamagne Tha God.

=== Literary Work ===
In 2023, Krishnamurthy authored Fashion Killa: How Hip-Hop Revolutionized High Fashion. The book began as a story in XXL. This is the first anthology on hip-hop fashion. Kirkus Reviews and Booklist named the book as one of the "best books of 2023". It was named as one of Pitchfork's "Best Music Books of 2024".

In January 2024, she announced that her next book is about Jay-Z and hip-hop label Roc-A-Fella Records called The Blueprint: Inside the Business of Roc-A-Fella Records. Kirkus Reviews and Publisher's Weekly have given the book positive starred reviews, calling it a "smart music history blended with a playbook for music-biz aspirants."

== Personal life ==
Krishnamurthy grew up in Kalamazoo, Michigan and graduated from the Ross School of Business at the University of Michigan. She is the first hip-hop journalist of Indian American descent and lives in New York City.

ELLE has called Krishnamurthy one of the women authors "redefining" the hip-hop books canon.

== Books ==
Fashion Killa: How Hip-Hop Revolutionized High Fashion. Gallery Books/Simon & Schuster. 2023. ISBN 9781982176327.

The Blueprint: Inside the Business of Roc-A-Fella Records. Simon/Schuster. 2026. ISBN 978-1-6680-6602-7.
