= Hoh (disambiguation) =

Hoh or HOH most commonly refers to:

- HOH, a variation of the chemical formula for water
- Hoh people, a Native American tribe in the United States

Hoh or HOH may also refer to:

== Places ==
- Hoh River, in the U.S. state of Washington
- Hoh Rainforest, on the Olympic Peninsula in the U.S. state of Washington
- Harrow-on-the-Hill station, England, by National Rail station code
- Hohenems-Dornbirn Airfield, Austria, by IATA code

== People ==
- Hilmar Örn Hilmarsson (born 1958), Icelandic musician and religious organisation leader
- Herman Otto Hartley (1912–1980), American statistician
- Eddie Hoh (1944–2015), American drummer

== Other ==
- Head Over Heels (video game), a 1987 isometric video game by Ocean Software Ltd
- The House of Hair, a Glam metal radio show hosted by Dee Snider of Twisted Sister
- Hard of hearing, hearing loss
- Head of Household, a filing status for individual U.S. taxpayers
- House of Hardcore, a U.S. wrestling promotion founded by professional wrestler Tommy Dreamer
- House of Highlights (HoH), a U.S. social media network
