= PnB Rock =

American rapper (1991–2022)

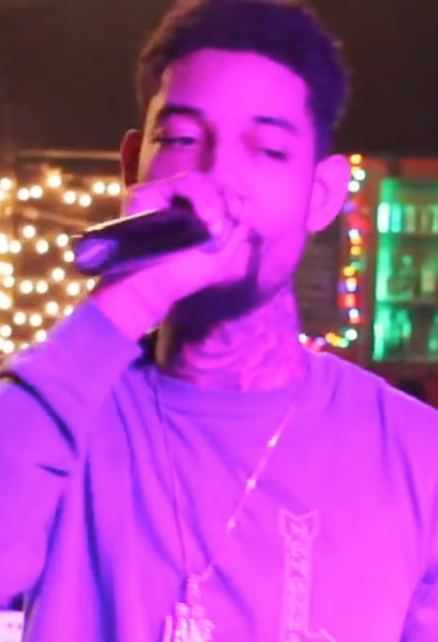
- PnB Rock performing in 2016

Background information
- Also known as: PnB; Grundle
- Born: Rakim Hasheem Allen; December 9, 1991; Philadelphia, Pennsylvania, U.S.
- Died: September 12, 2022 (aged 30) Los Angeles, California, U.S.
- Cause of death: Murder (gunshot wounds)
- Genres: Pop rap; Hip-Hop; Soul; R&B; Electronic; Trap
- Occupations: Rapper; singer; songwriter; record producer
- Years active: 2014–2022
- Labels: New Lane; Atlantic
- Children: 2
- Website: pnbrockofficial.com

Rakim Hasheem Allen (December 9, 1991 – September 12, 2022), known professionally as PnB Rock, was an American singer, rapper, and songwriter. Born and raised in Philadelphia, Allen signed with Atlantic Records in 2015. His 2016 single, "Selfish", became his first Billboard Hot 100 entry; it received triple platinum certification by the Recording Industry Association of America (RIAA) and served as lead single for his commercial mixtape GTTM: Goin Thru the Motions (2017), which entered the Billboard 200. His debut studio album, Catch These Vibes (2017), peaked at number 10 on the chart, while his second album, TrapStar Turnt PopStar (2019), peaked at number one.

Allen also guest performed on the Billboard Hot 100-top 40 singles "Cross Me" by Ed Sheeran, "Changes" by XXXTentacion, "Dangerous" by Meek Mill, and "Everyday We Lit" by YFN Lucci during his lifetime. He was chosen as part of the 2017 XXL Freshman Class.

PnB Rock was shot and killed during a robbery at Roscoe's House of Chicken 'N Waffles in South Los Angeles on September 12, 2022, at the age of 30. Three suspects were arrested in connection to the killing, including Freddie Lee Trone and his 17-year-old son. In August 2024, Freddie Trone was found guilty on all counts of first-degree murder, robbery, and conspiracy.

== Early life ==
Rakim Hasheem Allen was born on December 9, 1991, in the Germantown neighborhood of Philadelphia, Pennsylvania, to a Muslim family. Allen's father was murdered when he was three years old. He was primarily raised by his single mother. In his teen years, he lived in Northeast Philadelphia. He grew up listening to artists such as rapper 2Pac and R&B group Jodeci.

At age 13, Allen was sent to a youth detention program for committing robberies and fighting in school. When he turned 19, he was sentenced to 33 months in prison for drug possession and other crimes. Allen was homeless for a short period after being released from prison. He never finished high school. Allen later adopted the stage name PnB Rock, which paid homage to Pastorius and Baynton, a street corner near where he grew up in Germantown.

== Career ==
In June 2014, PnB Rock released his debut mixtape, Real N*gga Bangaz. He wrote the mixtape while he was incarcerated. In 2015, PnB Rock signed a record deal with Atlantic Records, and his first project under the label was the release of his third mixtape RnB3. In June 2016, he released the single "Selfish", which peaked at number 51 on the US Billboard Hot 100. In October 2016, Rolling Stone included him in their list of "10 New Artists You Need to Know".

In January 2017, he released his second retail mixtape album, GTTM: Goin Thru the Motions, through Atlantic Records and Empire Distribution. The album debuted at number 28 on the US Billboard 200 chart. In April 2017, he contributed to the soundtrack of The Fate of the Furious with two singles: "Gang Up" with Young Thug, 2 Chainz, and Wiz Khalifa and "Horses" with Kodak Black and A Boogie wit da Hoodie. In June 2017, PnB Rock was named as one of the ten members of XXL's "2017 Freshman Class" along with A Boogie wit da Hoodie, Playboi Carti, Ugly God, Kyle, Aminé, MadeinTYO, Kamaiyah, Kap G, and XXXTentacion.

His debut album TrapStar Turnt PopStar was released in May 2019. PnB Rock and Chance the Rapper were featured on Ed Sheeran's song "Cross Me" from Sheeran's album No.6 Collaborations Project. In January 2020, PnB Rock released the track "Ordinary" featuring late rapper Pop Smoke. In January 2021, he featured for the late rapper King Von, on a song titled "Rose Gold". In February 2022, PnB Rock released the mixtape SoundCloud Daze which featured various artists including Pasto Flocco, Iayze and Yung Fazo. He independently released "Luv Me Again" in September 2022, which was the last single he released during his lifetime.

== Murder of PnB Rock ==
Murder of PnB Rock
- Location: South Los Angeles, California, U.S.
- Date: September 12, 2022; 4 years ago 1:59 p.m. (PST)
- Target: PNB Rock
- Attack type: Murder by shooting, armed robbery
- Victims: Rakim Hasheem Allen, a.k.a. PnB Rock, aged 30
- Perpetrators: Freddie Lee Trone; Tremont Navon Jones
- Motive: Unknown
- Accused: Freddie and Shauntel's 17-year old son; Shauntel Trone; Wynisha Evans
- Charges: 17-year old juvenile and Freddie Trone: First-degree murder 17-year old, Freddie, and Jones: Second-degree robbery (2 counts); Conspiracy to commit robbery; Shauntel Trone and Evans: Accessory to murder
- Verdict: Freddie Trone and Tremont Jones: Guilty on all counts
- Sentence: Freddie Trone: Life imprisonment with the possibility of parole after 31 years Tremont Jones: 12 years imprisonment

On September 12, 2022, Allen was robbed and fatally shot at Roscoe's House of Chicken 'N Waffles near Main Street and Manchester Avenue in South Los Angeles. Three suspects were arrested in connection to the killing: an unnamed 17-year-old juvenile and his father Freddie Trone, plus 32-year-old Shauntel Trone, who was arrested for accessory to murder. Both the juvenile and Freddie Trone were charged with one count of first-degree murder, two counts of second-degree robbery, and one count of conspiracy to commit robbery.

In October 2023, new defendants Tremont Jones and Wynisha Evans appeared in court. Authorities believe the alleged killers were alerted to Allen's location by Jones, not an Instagram post by Allen's girlfriend, as originally suspected. Prosecutors allege Evans drove Trone from Los Angeles to Las Vegas after the murder. Jones and Evans both pled not guilty.

On August 7, 2024, Freddie Lee Trone was found guilty on all counts of first-degree murder, robbery, and conspiracy. Tremont Jones was also found guilty on all counts of robbery and conspiracy, and he was sentenced to serve 12 years in prison. In September 2024, Freddie Trone was sentenced to life imprisonment; he is required to serve at least 31 years of his sentence before he will be eligible for parole. At the time of Trone's sentencing, his juvenile son was still awaiting trial.

On May 29th, 2026, California Court of Appeal officially reviewed and upheld Freddie Lee Trone's murder charges. The judges added that: "The evidence shows Trone significantly increased the risks by arming his mentally unstable son"

== Discography ==
Studio albums

- Catch These Vibes (2017)
- TrapStar Turnt PopStar (2019)

== See also ==
- List of murdered hip-hop musicians
