= List of Texas Southern Tigers in the NFL draft =

Texas Southern Tigers football players have been drafted in the NFL Draft.

== Key ==
B	Back	K	Kicker	NT	Nose tackle
C	Center	LB	Linebacker	FB	Fullback
DB	Defensive back	P	Punter	HB	Halfback
DE	Defensive end	QB	Quarterback	WR	Wide receiver
DT	Defensive tackle	RB	Running back	G	Guard
E	End	T	Offensive tackle	TE	Tight end

== Selections ==
Year	Round	Pick	Overall	Player	Team	Position
1955	19	5	222	Ed Smith	Pittsburgh Steelers	B
1960	14	9	165	Jim Sorey	Chicago Bears	T
1963	11	5	145	Winston Hill	Baltimore Colts	T
1963	20	12	278	Homer Jones	New York Giants	B
1964	12	6	160	Warren Wells	Detroit Lions	E
1964	18	14	252	Bob Batts	Chicago Bears	RB
1967	2	7	33	Willie Ellison	Los Angeles Rams	RB
1967	2	23	49	Roy Hopkins	Houston Oilers	RB
1967	5	26	133	John Douglas	New York Saints	DB
1967	11	20	283	Leroy Mitchell	Boston Patriots	WR
1968	6	8	146	Jimmy Hines	Miami Dolphins	WR
1968	13	1	328	James Bivins	Cincinnati Bengals	LB
1968	15	11	392	Coger Coverson	Washington Redskins	G
1968	17	21	456	Wesley Williams	Kansas City Chiefs	LB
1969	2	2	28	Ernest Calloway	Philadelphia Eagles	LB
1969	6	18	148	Marion Bates	Minnesota Vikings	DB
1969	16	3	393	Ed Hughes	Atlanta Falcons	RB
1969	16	11	401	Lloyd Mumphord	Miami Dolphins	DB
1970	1	10	10	Ken Burrough	New Orleans Saints	WR
1970	9	14	222	Charlie Blossom	Houston Oilers	DE
1970	14	2	340	Bert Askson	Pittsburgh Steelers	LB
1971	2	1	27	Julius Adams	New England Patriots	DT
1971	8	2	184	Larry Crowe	Pittsburgh Steelers	RB
1971	8	21	203	Ernie Holmes	Pittsburgh Steelers	DT
1971	11	16	276	Nate Allen	Kansas City Chiefs	DB
1971	13	21	333	Lionel Hepburn	Miami Dolphins	DB
1971	13	25	337	James Ford	Dallas Cowboys	RB
1971	14	13	351	Edward O'Daniel	San Diego Chargers	DE
1972	6	21	151	Edward Hebert	Los Angeles Rams	DT
1973	1	18	18	Mike Holmes	San Francisco 49ers	DB
1973	16	12	402	Larry Smiley	Minnesota Vikings	DE
1974	8	26	208	Melvin Baker	Miami Dolphins	WR
1974	11	19	279	Harold Hart	Oakland Raiders	RB
1975	12	3	289	Alonza Picket	Atlanta Falcons	T
1975	15	13	377	Jack Holmes	Houston Oilers	RB
1976	2	6	34	Charles Philyaw	Oakland Raiders	DT
1976	3	28	88	Ernie Pough	Pittsburgh Steelers	WR
1980	12	17	322	Calvin Muhammad	Oakland Raiders	WR
1983	6	8	148	Gene Branton	Tampa Bay Buccaneers	WR
1983	12	1	308	Carl Williams	Baltimore Colts	WR
1991	4	27	110	Kevin Harris	Dallas Cowboys	DE
1992	5	8	120	Greg Briggs	Dallas Cowboys	DB
1992	10	16	268	Alberto White	Los Angeles Raiders	DE
1993	2	11	40	Michael Strahan	New York Giants	DE
1993	4	2	86	Kevin Johnson	New England Patriots	DT
1994	3	25	90	Joe Burch	New England Patriots	C
1995	7	15	223	Jessie Cox	Indianapolis Colts	LB
1997	5	27	157	Nick Lopez	Miami Dolphins	DE
2000	5	22	151	Joey Jamison	Green Bay Packers	WR
2015	4	37	136	Tray Walker	Baltimore Ravens	DB

== Notable undrafted players ==
Note: No drafts held before 1920

Debut year	Player name	Position	Debut NFL/AFL team	Notes
1983	Vince Courville	WR	Los Angeles Raiders	—
1983	Arthur Cox	TE	Atlanta Falcons	—
1985	Leon Thomasson	CB	Atlanta Falcons	—
1987	Warren Bone	DE	Pittsburgh Steelers	—
2003	Oliver Celestin	S	Cleveland Browns	—
2012	Joseph Anderson	WR	Chicago Bears	—
2016	Cory Carter	P	Houston Texans	—
