= Kevin Johnson (defensive tackle) =

American football player (1970–2026)

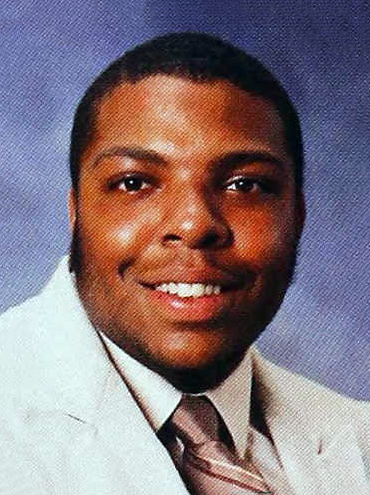
- High school yearbook portrait, 1988

No. 94, 98
- Position: Defensive tackle

Personal information
- Born: October 30, 1970; Los Angeles, California, U.S.
- Died: January 21, 2026 (aged 55); Willowbrook, California, U.S
- Listed height: 6 ft 1 in (1.85 m)
- Listed weight: 305 lb (138 kg)

Career information
- High school: Westchester (Los Angeles)
- College: Texas Southern
- NFL draft: 1993: 4th round, 86th overall pick

Career history
- New England Patriots (1993)*; Minnesota Vikings (1993)*; Oakland Raiders (1995)*; Philadelphia Eagles (1995–1996); Oakland Raiders (1997); Orlando Predators (1998–1999); Los Angeles Avengers (2000–2001)
- * Offseason or practice squad member only

Awards and highlights
- ArenaBowl champion (1998)

Career NFL statistics
- Tackles: 54
- Sacks: 7
- Fumble recoveries: 1
- Stats at Pro Football Reference

Career AFL statistics
- Tackles: 12
- Sacks: 1
- Passes defended: 2
- Stats at ArenaFan.com

Kevin Lamar Johnson (October 30, 1970 – January 21, 2026) was an American professional football player who was a defensive tackle for three seasons in the National Football League (NFL) with the Philadelphia Eagles and Oakland Raiders. He was selected by the New England Patriots in the fourth round of the 1993 NFL draft. He played college football at Los Angeles Harbor College and Texas Southern University. He also played for the Orlando Predators and Los Angeles Avengers of the Arena Football League (AFL).

== Early life and college ==
Kevin Lamar Johnson was born on October 30, 1970, in Los Angeles, California. He attended Westchester High School in Los Angeles, helping bring his team to the CIF Los Angeles City Section football championship game in 1987 and 1988, winning the title in the former year.

Johnson first played college football at Los Angeles Harbor College from 1989 to 1990. He then transferred to play for the Texas Southern Tigers of Texas Southern University from 1991 to 1992. At Texas Southern, he played on the defensive line alongside future NFL Pro Football Hall of Fame defensive end Michael Strahan.

== Professional career ==
Johnson was selected by the New England Patriots in the fourth round, with the 86th overall pick, of the 1993 NFL draft. He officially signed with the team on June 30. He was released on August 23, 1993. He was signed to the practice squad of the Minnesota Vikings on September 1, 1993. He was released on September 27, 1993. Johnson signed with the Oakland Raiders in 1995. On August 28, 1995, it was reported that he had been waived.

He was claimed off waivers by the Philadelphia Eagles on August 29, 1995. He played in 11 games, starting one, for the Eagles during the 1995 season, totaling 19 solo tackles, six sacks, one forced fumble, and one fumble recovery that he returned 37 yards for a touchdown. He also played in two playoff games that year, posting one solo tackle and one assisted tackle. He appeared in 12 games, starting five, during the 1996 season, recording 14 solo tackles, ten assisted tackles, and one sack. Johnson was released by the Eagles on December 17, 1996.

Johnson signed with the Raiders again in 1997. He played in 15 games for Oakland in 1997, posting seven solo tackles and four assisted tackles. He was released on March 12, 1998.

He played in seven games for the Orlando Predators of the Arena Football League (AFL) in 1998, recording two solo tackles, one assisted tackle, and one pass breakup. He was an offensive lineman/defensive lineman during his time in the AFL as the league played under ironman rules. On August 23, 1998, the Predators won ArenaBowl XII against the Tampa Bay Storm by a score of 62–31. Johnson appeared in ten games during the 1999 season, totaling five solo tackles, eight assisted tackles, and one sack. On August 21, 1999, the Predators lost to the Albany Firebirds in ArenaBowl XIII 59–48.

Johnson signed with the Los Angeles Avengers of the AFL for the 2000 season. He was placed on injured reserve on April 11, 2000. He re-signed with the team on May 23, 2001. He was placed on injured reserve again on June 29, and suspended on July 3, 2001. Overall, Johnson played in four games for the Avengers during the 2001 season, totaling one assisted tackle and one pass breakup.

== Killing ==
Johnson was found dead on January 21, 2026, at a homeless encampment in Los Angeles. He was 55. The medical examiner's office listed the cause of death as "blunt head trauma and stab wounds", ruling the death a homicide. Johnson's friends, as well as trained neuroscientists, said that he likely had chronic traumatic encephalopathy, a neurological condition caused by repeated trauma, common in football players, and had been homeless for years.
