= Melvin Baker =

American football player (born 1950)

No. 82, 86, 83, 81, 12
- Position: Wide receiver

Personal information
- Born: August 12, 1950 (age 76); Beaumont, Texas, U.S.
- Listed height: 6 ft 0 in (1.83 m)
- Listed weight: 189 lb (86 kg)

Career information
- High school: Sam Houston (Houston, Texas)
- College: Texas Southern (1970–1973)
- NFL draft: 1974: 8th round, 208th overall pick

Career history
- Miami Dolphins (1974); New Orleans Saints (1975); New England Patriots (1975); San Diego Chargers (1975); Houston Oilers (1976); St. Louis Cardinals (1976); Buffalo Bills (1977)

Career NFL statistics
- Receptions: 9
- Receiving yards: 179
- Receiving TDs: 2
- Stats at Pro Football Reference

Melvin Clyde Baker (born August 12, 1950) is an American former professional football player who was a wide receiver for three seasons in the National Football League (NFL) with the Miami Dolphins, New Orleans Saints, New England Patriots, San Diego Chargers, and Houston Oilers. He was selected by the Dolphins in the eighth round of the 1974 NFL draft after playing college football for the Texas Southern Tigers. Baker was also a member of the St. Louis Cardinals and Buffalo Bills.

== Early life and college ==
Melvin Clyde Baker was born on August 12, 1950, in Beaumont, Texas. He attended Sam Houston High School in Houston, Texas.

Baker was a member of the Texas Southern Tigers of Texas Southern University from 1970 to 1973.

== Professional career ==
Baker was selected by the Miami Dolphins in the eighth round, with the 208th overall pick, of the 1974 NFL draft. He played in nine games for the Dolphins during the 1974 season, recording four receptions for 121 yards and two touchdowns, one kick return for 22 yards, and one fumble.

On September 9, 1975, Baker was traded to the New Orleans Saints for an undisclosed draft pick. He appeared in two games, starting one, for the Saints, catching two passes for 26 yards while also rushing once for 21 yards. He was released on September 29, 1975.

Baker signed with the New England Patriots on October 8, 1975. He played in one game for the Patriots, recovering one fumble, before being released on October 20, 1975.

Baker then signed with the San Diego Chargers and appeared in one game before being released again on November 13, 1975.

Baker was signed by the Houston Oilers on May 11, 1976. He played in eight games in 1976, totaling three catches for 32 yards, one rushing attempt for two yards, and one kick return for 15 yards. He was released on November 4, 1976.

Baker signed with the St. Louis Cardinals late in 1976. He was released on August 31, 1977.

Baker was signed by the Buffalo Bills on September 8, 1977. He was released on October 27, 1977, without appearing in a game.
