= June James =

June James may refer to:

- June James (American football) (1962–1990), American football linebacker
- June James (cricketer) (born 1925), Australian cricket player
- June James (producer) (born 1990), American music producer
- June James (physician), Canadian pediatrician
