= Cory Carter =

American football player (born 1994)

No. 2, 7, 8
- Position: Punter

Personal information
- Born: March 5, 1994 (age 32); Raymond, Mississippi
- Listed height: 5 ft 9 in (1.75 m)
- Listed weight: 200 lb (91 kg)

Career information
- High school: Callaway (Jackson, Mississippi)
- College: Texas Southern
- NFL draft: 2016: undrafted

Career history
- Houston Texans (2017)*; Buffalo Bills (2017–2019)*; St. Louis BattleHawks (2020)
- * Offseason or practice squad member only
- Stats at Pro Football Reference

Cory Carter (born March 5, 1994) is an American former football punter. He played college football at Texas Southern.

== Professional career ==
=== Houston Texans ===
On January 2, 2017, Carter signed a reserve/future contract with the Houston Texans. He was waived on September 2, 2017.

=== Buffalo Bills ===
On December 5, 2017, Carter was signed to the Buffalo Bills' practice squad. He signed a reserve/future contract with the Bills on January 8, 2018. Carter entered the 2018 preseason competing with veteran Colton Schmidt. In the second preseason game, Carter suffered a knee injury after being hit following a punt. He was diagnosed with a torn ACL the following day and was then placed on injured reserve.

On August 26, 2019, Carter was released by the Bills.

=== St. Louis BattleHawks ===
Carter signed with the St. Louis BattleHawks of the XFL on March 9, 2020. He had his contract terminated when the league suspended operations on April 10, 2020.
