= James Ford (American football) =

American football player (born 1949)

No. 28, 46
- Position: Running back

Personal information
- Born: September 11, 1949 (age 77); Jacksonville, Florida, U.S.
- Listed height: 6 ft 0 in (1.83 m)
- Listed weight: 200 lb (91 kg)

Career information
- High school: Stanton (Jacksonville)
- College: Texas Southern
- NFL draft: 1971: 13th round, 337th overall pick

Career history
- Dallas Cowboys (1971)*; New Orleans Saints (1971–1972); Houston Oilers (1973)*; New York Stars/Charlotte Hornets (1974–1975)
- * Offseason or practice squad member only

Career NFL statistics
- Rushing attempts: 104
- Rushing yards: 407
- Rushing TDs: 2
- Stats at Pro Football Reference

James Leon Ford (born September 11, 1949) is an American former professional football player who was a running back for the New Orleans Saints of the National Football League (NFL). He played college football for the Texas Southern Tigers. Ford also played professionally for the he New York Stars and Charlotte Hornets of the World Football League (WFL).

== Early life ==
Ford attended Stanton College Preparatory School in Jacksonville, Florida, where he practiced football, basketball, track and swimming.

He accepted a football scholarship from Texas Southern University, where he developed until late in his college career. As a senior in 1970, he registered 62 carries for 295 yards and 2 touchdowns.

== Professional career ==
Ford was selected by the Dallas Cowboys in the thirteenth round (337th overall) of the 1971 NFL draft. He was waived on September 13.

On September 14, 1971, he was claimed off waivers by the New Orleans Saints. He was named the starter at running back in the third game. He ranked third on the team in rushing with 379 yards, while playing in 9 games (7 starts) during the season, even though he suffered a season-ending knee injury in the ninth game.

In 1972, he rejoined the team in the ninth game of season because of the recovery of a follow-up knee surgery. He played in 5 games (1 start), mainly on special teams and had 28 rushing yards in the season finale against the Green Bay Packers.

On August 1, 1973, he was traded to the Houston Oilers in exchange for a sixth (#131-Jay Washington) and a tenth round draft choice (#235-Frosty Anderson). He was released on September 11.

Ford was also a member of the New York Stars/Charlotte Hornets of the World Football League from 1974 to 1975.
