= Ernie Calloway =

American football player (born 1948)

- Calloway in 1972

No. 57, 77, 78
- Positions: Defensive tackle, Defensive end

Personal information
- Born: January 1, 1948; Orlando, Florida, U.S.
- Died: November 29, 2023 (aged 75)
- Listed height: 6 ft 6 in (1.98 m)
- Listed weight: 255 lb (116 kg)

Career information
- High school: Jones (Orlando)
- College: Texas Southern (1965–1968)
- NFL draft: 1969: 2nd round, 28th overall pick

Career history
- Philadelphia Eagles (1969–1972); Kansas City Chiefs (1973); Florida Blazers (1974); Toronto Argonauts (1975)*
- * Offseason or practice squad member only

Awards and highlights
- Second-team All-American (1968)

Career NFL statistics
- Fumble recoveries: 2
- Sacks: 8
- Stats at Pro Football Reference

Ernest Henry Calloway (January 1, 1948 – November 29, 2023) was an American professional football player who was a defensive lineman for four seasons with the Philadelphia Eagles of the National Football League (NFL). He played college football for the Texas Southern Tigers and was selected by the Eagles in the second round of the 1969 NFL/AFL draft.

== Early life ==
Ernest Henry Calloway was born January 1, 1948 in Orlando, Florida, attending Jones High School in that city. He played college football for the Texas Southern Tigers of Texas Southern University. He was on the freshman team in 1965 and the main roster from 1966 to 1968. He was a team captain and All-American in 1968. He was three times named a member of the All-Southwest Conference team.

== Professional career ==
Calloway was selected by the Philadelphia Eagles in the second round, with the 28th overall pick, of the 1969 NFL/AFL draft. He played in all 14 games, starting eight, for the Eagles during his rookie year in 1969 and posted three sacks. He finished tied for second in AP NFL Defensive Rookie of the Year voting. He appeared in 14 games for the second straight year, starting 13, in 1970, recording 1.5 sacks and one fumble recovery. Calloway played in 14 games for the third consecutive season, starting 12, in 1971, totaling 3.5 sacks and one fumble recovery. He played in five games, all starts, for the Eagles during the 1972 season.

In May 1973, Calloway and Leroy Keyes were traded to the Kansas City Chiefs for Gerry Philbin and a possible undisclosed future draft pick. Calloway spent the entire 1973 season on injured reserve and was released in 1974.

Calloway signed with the Florida Blazers of the World Football League (WFL) on July 14, 1974. He was later placed on injured reserve.

Calloway signed with the Toronto Argonauts of the Canadian Football League in 1975 but was later released.

== Personal life ==
Calloway worked as a contractor after his football career. He was also a Bible scholar and a chess player. He died on November 29, 2023.
