= Darvin Kidsy =

American football player (born 1995)

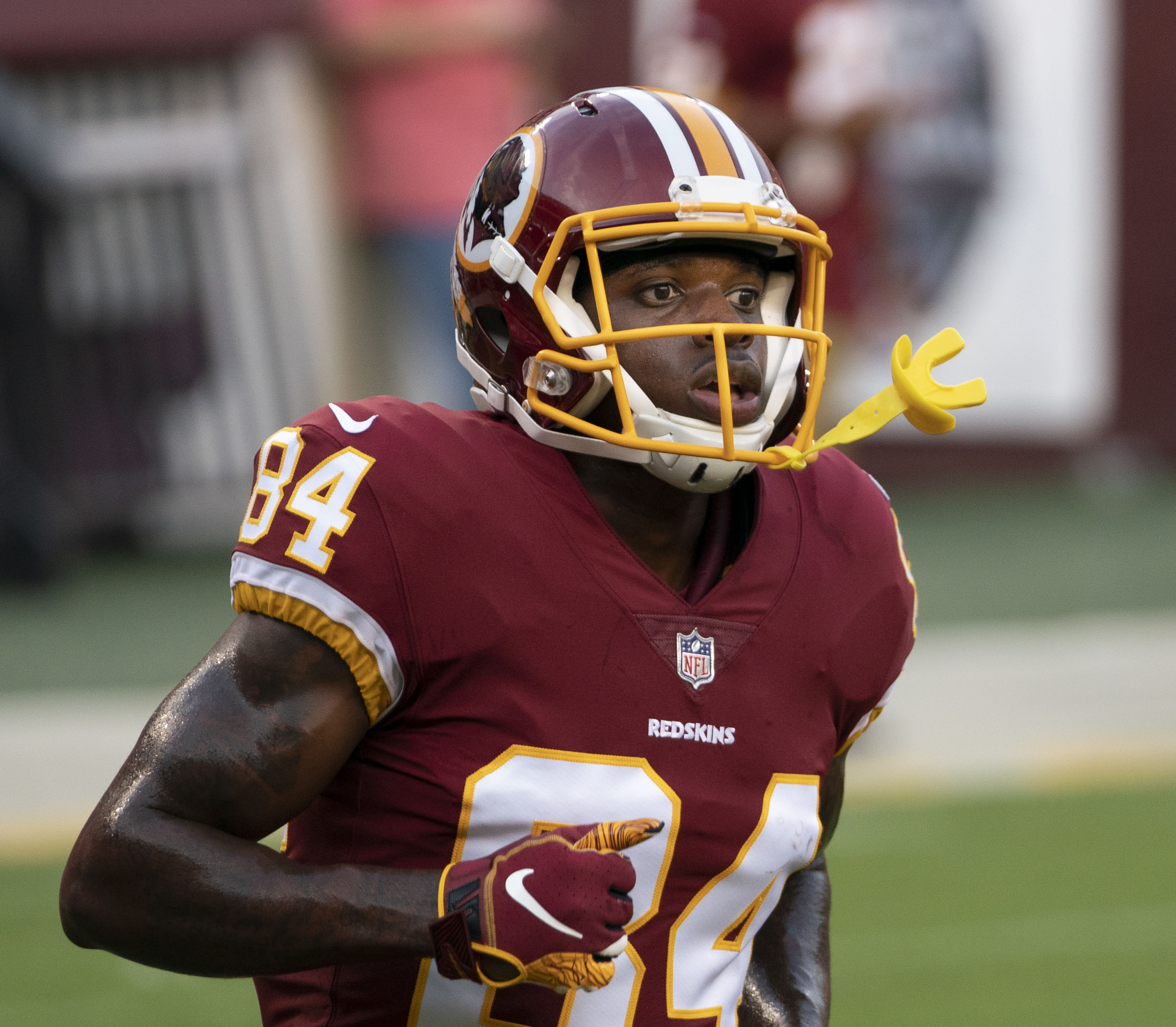
- Kidsy with the Washington Redskins in 2018

Profile
- Position: Wide receiver

Personal information
- Born: March 19, 1995 (age 31); Missouri City, Texas, U.S.
- Listed height: 6 ft 0 in (1.83 m)
- Listed weight: 180 lb (82 kg)

Career information
- High school: Elkins (Missouri City)
- College: North Texas (2013-2015); Texas Southern (2016-2017)
- NFL draft: 2018: undrafted

Career history
- Washington Redskins (2018–2019); Seattle Seahawks (2020–2021)*; Saskatchewan Roughriders (2022)*; Houston Gamblers (2022)*; Hamilton Tiger-Cats (2023)*
- * Offseason or practice squad member only

Career NFL statistics
- Receptions: 1
- Receiving yards: 8
- Stats at Pro Football Reference

Darvin Kidsy Jr. (born March 19, 1995) is an American football wide receiver. He played college football at North Texas and Texas Southern. He has also been a member of the Washington Redskins, Seattle Seahawks, Saskatchewan Roughriders, and Houston Gamblers.

== College career ==
Kidsy began his career at the University of North Texas, where he played for three seasons. As a junior in 2015, he played in 11 games, starting two of them, and recorded 17 receptions for 240 yards and two touchdowns. In three seasons at North Texas, Kidsy appeared in 36 games, catching 48 passes for 539 yards and two touchdowns, and recording two punt return touchdowns and one kick return touchdown.

Kidsy transferred to Texas Southern University after his junior year following an arrest stemming from a hit-and-run accident in which he was alleged to be the driver of a vehicle that struck and seriously injured two pedestrians on December 5, 2015. He was arrested on January 8, 2016, charged with causing an accident involving personal injury, a third-degree felony in Texas. Kidsy was forced to sit out the 2016 season due to NCAA transfer rules. In his lone year playing at Texas Southern, as a redshirt senior in 2017, Kidsy had 38 receptions for 519 yards and three touchdowns.

== Professional career ==
=== Washington Redskins/Football Team ===
Kidsy signed with the Washington Football Team as an undrafted free agent on May 14, 2018 after participating in a rookie minicamp with the team. He was cut by the Redskins at the end of training camp and subsequently re-signed to the team's practice squad on September 2, 2018. Kidsy was promoted to the Redskins active roster on December 20, 2018. He made his NFL debut on December 22, 2018 against the Tennessee Titans. He caught his first career pass, an eight-yard reception from Josh Johnson, in the Redskins’ final game of the season against the Philadelphia Eagles.

On August 31, 2019, Kidsy was waived by the Redskins. He was re-signed to the practice squad on October 2, 2019. He was promoted to the active roster on December 7, 2019, before being waived again on August 31, 2020.

=== Seattle Seahawks ===
Kidsy signed with the Seattle Seahawks' practice squad on December 2, 2020, and was released six days later. Kidsy signed a futures contract with the Seahawks on January 29, 2021. He was waived on August 5, 2021, when the Seahawks signed former Iowa State basketball player Michael Jacobson to the preseason camp roster.

=== Saskatchewan Roughriders ===
Kidsy signed with the Saskatchewan Roughriders of the Canadian Football League on January 24, 2022. He was released on May 14.

=== Houston Gamblers ===
Kidsy signed with the Houston Gamblers of the United States Football League on May 19, 2022, and was subsequently transferred to the team's inactive roster the next day. He was released on May 27.
