= Alberto White =

American football player (born 1971)

No. 94, 96
- Position: Defensive end

Personal information
- Born: April 8, 1971 (age 55); Miami, Florida, U.S.
- Listed height: 6 ft 3 in (1.91 m)
- Listed weight: 260 lb (118 kg)

Career information
- High school: Miami Southridge (South Miami Heights, Florida)
- College: Texas Southern (1990–1992)
- NFL draft: 1992: 10th round, 268th overall pick

Career history
- Los Angeles Raiders (1992)*; Winnipeg Blue Bombers (1993)*; Los Angeles/Oakland Raiders (1993–1995); St. Louis Rams (1995); Green Bay Packers (1995)*; St. Louis Rams (1996); Memphis Maniax (2001)
- * Offseason or practice squad member only

Career NFL statistics
- Games played: 13
- Tackles: 6
- Sacks: 3
- Stats at Pro Football Reference

Alberto Eduardo White (born April 8, 1971) is an American former professional football defensive end who played in the National Football League (NFL) with the Los Angeles/Oakland Raiders, St. Louis Rams and Green Bay Packers. He played college football for the Texas Southern Tigers. White also has been a member of the Winnipeg Blue Bombers of the Canadian Football League (CFL) and the Memphis Maniax of the XFL.

== Early life ==
White was born on April 8, 1971, in Miami, Florida. He attended Miami Southridge Senior High School in South Miami Heights, Florida.

== College career ==
White played college football for the Texas Southern Tigers from 1990 to 1992.

== Professional career ==
=== Los Angeles Raiders (first stint) ===
White was selected in the tenth round, with the 268th overall selection, by the Los Angeles Raiders in the 1992 NFL draft. On July 12, 1992, he officially signed with the team. During training camp, White was involved in multiple fights with teammates, including center Dan Turk. He also got into it with Nick Bell and Ron Brown in what was supposed to be a non-contact practice, with head coach Art Shell noting his aggressiveness. On August 25, White was released by the team.

=== Winnipeg Blue Bombers ===
White was signed by the Winnipeg Blue Bombers of the Canadian Football League (CFL) but did not play in a game.

=== Los Angeles/Oakland Raiders (second stint) ===
White was brought back by the Raiders in 1993 but was released by the team on August 24. On May 4, 1994, the team signed him again. White was released on August 29 and signed to the practice squad the following day. He was elevated to the active roster On November 4, 1994. In eight games, White made four tackles and two sacks. On August 22, 1995, he was waived by the Raiders.

=== St. Louis Rams (first stint) ===
On August 23, 1995, the St. Louis Rams picked up White off of waivers. He played in the first two games and recorded one tackle and one sack, both against the New Orleans Saints. On September 14, 1995, he was released by the team after yelling at an assistant coach.

=== Green Bay Packers ===
On October 11, 1995, White was signed by the Green Bay Packers. He was waived by the team on October 13.

=== St. Louis Rams (second stint) ===
On February 2, 1996, the Rams signed White. He appeared in three games as a backup and made one assisted tackle. After a 31–37 overtime loss to the Baltimore Ravens, White "went on a profane tirade against the media in the locker room" and "told reporters to clear out". He was released on October 28, 1996, due to his conduct, with head coach Rich Brooks mentioning his "Mad Cow" nickname.

=== Memphis Maniax ===
White was selected with the 37th pick in the 2001 XFL supplemental draft by the Memphis Maniax. On January 11, 2001, he was waived by the team.
