= Joe Burch =

American football player (born 1971)

No. 69, 75
- Positions: Center, defensive tackle

Personal information
- Born: August 8, 1971 (age 55); Dallas, Texas, U.S.
- Listed height: 6 ft 4 in (1.93 m)
- Listed weight: 296 lb (134 kg)

Career information
- High school: Dallas Carter
- College: Texas Southern
- NFL draft: 1994: 3rd round, 90th overall pick

Career history
- New England Patriots (1994); Denver Broncos (1994); Connecticut Coyotes (1994–1995); Minnesota Vikings (1995)*; Arizona Rattlers (1996–1999); Houston ThunderBears (2000); Arizona Rattlers (2001–2001); Las Vegas Gladiators (2004–2005)
- * Offseason or practice squad member only

Awards and highlights
- Offensive Lineman of the Year (1993); First-team Division I-AA All-American (1993); All-SWAC (1993)

Career AFL statistics
- Total tackles: 59
- Sacks: 6
- Forced fumbles: 5
- Fumble recoveries: 2
- Stats at ArenaFan.com

Joe Burch (born August 8, 1971) is an American former professional football offensive and defensive lineman.

== Early life ==
Burch prepped at David W. Carter High School in Dallas, Texas, where he won the 1988 5A Texas state championship (vacated due to ineligible player) alongside Jessie Armstead and Clifton Abraham.

== College career ==
He went on to play at Texas Southern University, where he was named second-team All-Southwestern Athletic Conference during his sophomore and junior year. As a senior in 1993, he was named Offensive Lineman of the Year, first-team Division I-AA All-American and All-Southwestern Athletic Conference.

== Professional career ==
He was drafted in the third round (90th overall) of the 1994 NFL draft by the New England Patriots before being traded to the Denver Broncos. Burch began his arena football career in 1995, starting the season with Connecticut Coyotes before being traded to the Arizona Rattlers for quarterback Aaron Garcia.

On March 21, 2002, Burch re-signed with the Rattlers.
