= Texas Southern University =

Historically black university in Houston, Texas, US

- Former names: Houston Colored Junior College (1927–1934); Houston College for Negroes (1934–1947); Texas State University for Negroes (1947–1951)
- Motto: Excellence in Achievement
- Type: Public historically black university
- Established: March 7, 1927; 99 years ago
- Endowment: $100 million (2024)
- President: James W. Crawford III
- Provost: Lillian B. Poats (interim)
- Administrative staff: 500
- Students: 7,366 (fall 2024)
- Undergraduates: 6,844 (fall 2024)
- Postgraduates: 522 (fall 2024)
- Location: Houston, Texas, U.S. 29°43′20″N 95°21′40″W
- Campus: Urban, 150 acres (61 ha)
- Newspaper: The TSU Herald
- Colors: Maroon & gray
- Nickname: Tigers
- Sporting affiliations: NCAA Division I FCS – SWAC
- Mascot: Tiger
- Website: tsu.edu

Texas Southern University (Texas Southern or TSU) is a public historically black university in Houston, Texas, United States. The university is a member school of the Thurgood Marshall College Fund and is accredited by the Southern Association of Colleges and Schools. It is classified among "R2: Doctoral Universities – High research activity".

Texas Southern University is an important institution in Houston's Third Ward. Alvia Wardlaw of Cite: The Architecture + Design Review of Houston wrote that the university serves as "the cultural and community center of" the Third Ward area where it is located, in addition to being its university. The university also serves as a notable economic resource for Greater Houston, contributing over $500 million to the region's gross sales and being directly and indirectly responsible for over 3,000 jobs.

Texas Southern University intercollegiate sports teams, the Tigers, compete in NCAA Division I and the Southwestern Athletic Conference (SWAC). Texas Southern is home of the Ocean of Soul marching band.

== History ==
On March 7, 1927, the Houston Independent School District board resolved to establish junior colleges for each race, as the state was racially segregated in all public facilities. The resolution created Houston Junior College, which later became the University of Houston, and Houston Colored Junior College, which first held classes at Jack Yates High School during the evenings. The school's name was later changed to Houston College for Negroes in 1934.

In February 1946, Heman Marion Sweatt, an African American man, applied to the University of Texas School of Law. He was denied admission because of race, and subsequently filed suit in Sweatt v. Painter (1950). The state had no law school for African Americans. To avoid integrating the University of Texas Law School, the state of Texas made several offers to Heman Marion Sweatt to keep him from going to court. They offered to establish the Texas State University of Negroes which would include a law school. Some black leaders welcomed the idea of having another state supported university in Texas, while many others felt as though the university was created to solely avoid the integration of the University of Texas, as well as other white institutions. In the end, they did not grant Sweatt a writ of mandamus to attend the University of Texas. Instead the trial court granted a continuance for six months to allow the state time to create a law school for blacks.

As a result, the Fiftieth Texas Legislature passed Texas Senate Bill 140 on March 3, 1947, authorizing and funding the creation of Texas State University for Negroes as the first state university to be located in Houston. The school was established to serve African Americans in Texas and offer them fields of study comparable to those available to white Texans. The state took over the Houston Independent School District (HISD)-run Houston College for Negroes as a basis for the new university. Houston College moved to the present site (adjacent to the University of Houston), which was donated by Hugh Roy Cullen. It had one permanent building and an existing faculty and students. The new university was charged with teaching "pharmacy, dentistry, arts and sciences, journalism, education, literature, law, medicine and other professional courses." The legislature stipulated that "these courses shall be equivalent to those offered at other institutions of this type supported by the State of Texas."

Given the differences in facilities and intangibles, such as the distance of the new school from Austin, the University of Texas School of Law, and other law students, the United States Supreme Court ruled the new facility did not satisfy "separate but equal" provisions. It ruled that African Americans must also be admitted to the University of Texas Law School at Austin. See Sweatt v. Painter (1950).

In March 1960, Texas Southern University students organized Houston's first sit-in at the Weingarten's lunch counter located at 4110 Almeda. The success of their efforts inspired more sit-ins throughout the city, which, within months, led to the desegregation of many of Houston's public establishments. A historical marker commissioned by the Texas Historical Commission stands on the property of the first sit-in to commemorate the courageous acts of those TSU students. That property is now a U.S. Post Office. TSU journalism professor Serbino Sandifer-Walker worked for nearly two years with the Texas Historical Commission, the original students who led the march, and many other stakeholders, to have the historic marker designated on March 4, 2010, the fiftieth anniversary of that sit-in.

On May 17, 1967, it was reported that students at TSU rioted on campus. When officers responded thousands of shots were fired and there were injuries on both sides including a death of a police officer. Nearly 500 students were arrested. Although media sources reported this as a riot, there were no reports of looting, destruction of property, or resistance of any arrest. Furthermore, the reports failed to mention the prior invasion of police officers on campus, or the reports of students getting roughed up on campus. The police raid caused over $10,000 of damage and it was reported over 3,000 shots were fired into the Lanier dormitory. There was little coverage that, the five students whom were charged with conspiracy and incitement of riot were all exonerated due to lack of evidence, or that the police officer died not from student fire, but the ricochet of Houston Police Department bullets.

In 1993, Joann Horton became the first woman to become president of the university.

A Democratic presidential debate took place on September 12, 2019, in TSU's Health and Physical Education Arena.

The university drew national attention in early 2020 when the governor-appointed board of trustees targeted the university's sitting president, changing its bylaws to empower the board to remove anyone employed by the university. The board first suspended and then fired president Austin Lane, alleging that he failed to inform them about allegations of fraud committed by a former assistant dean at the Thurgood Marshall School of Law. Lane disputed the allegations. Just prior to removing Lane, the board also changed its bylaws to allow it to "approve the termination of any position" at the university, a change that drew condemnation from several university governance experts as inappropriate micromanagement. In February 2020, the board of trustees publicly agreed there was no wrongdoing on the part of Lane and paid him nearly $900,000 in the buyout of his contract. A new president was to be named in 2020. In February 2020, one month prior to the visit of a site visit team representing the university's regional accreditor, the board partially repealed the new bylaws that allowed them to fire any university employee.

== Campus ==
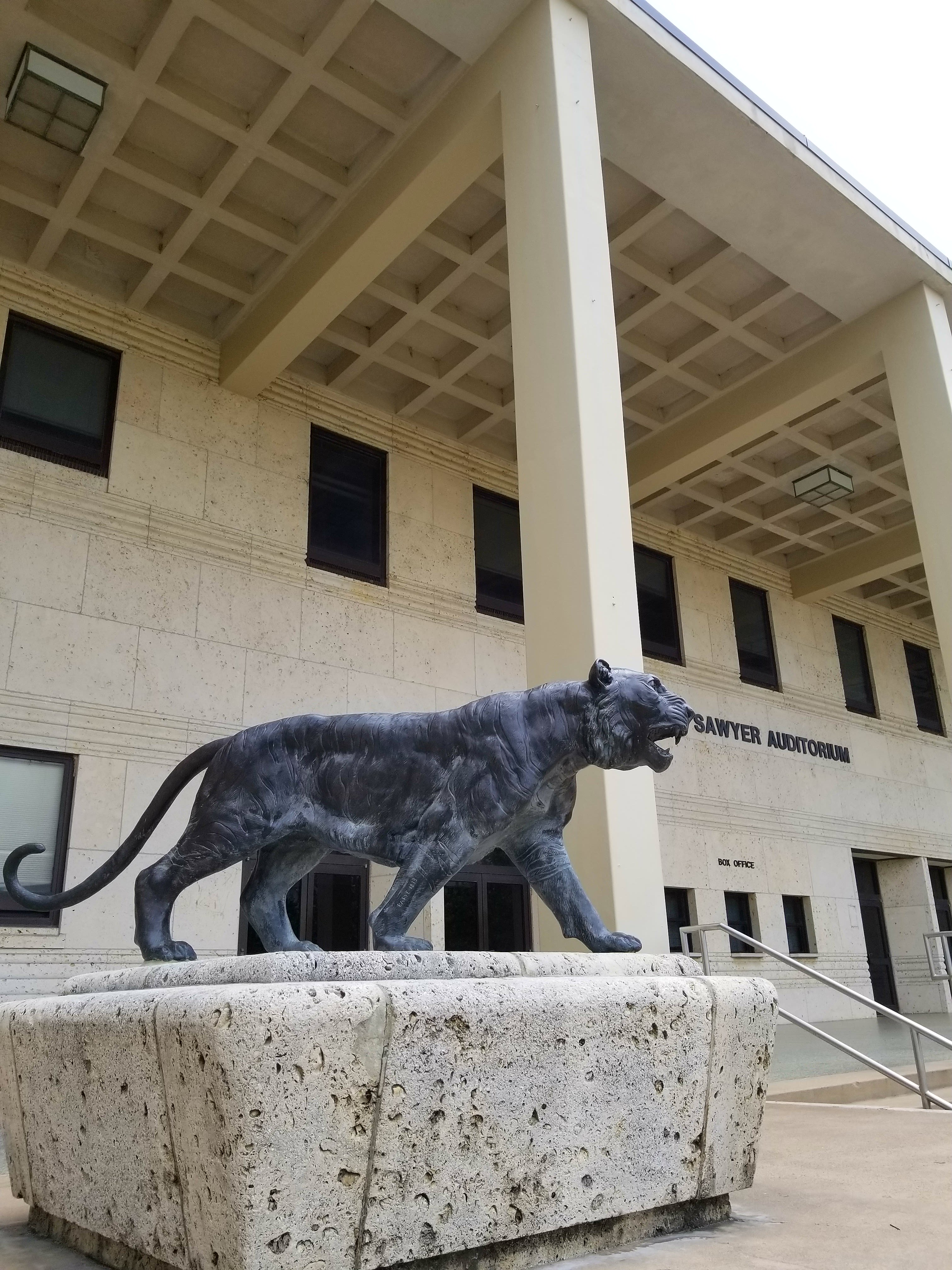
Granville M. Sawyer Auditorium, July 2017

The university has more than 45 buildings on a 150-acre (0.61 km^{2}) urban gated campus centrally located in Houston. The campus is two miles southeast of downtown Houston, and five miles east of Uptown Houston. TSU is recognized as a Tree Campus USA school for its commitment to preserving and increasing campus trees.

The school's first structure was the Thornton B. Fairchild Building, built 1947–1948 and housing administration and classroom space. Temporary buildings served as faculty housing during that time. The Mack H. Hannah hall, designed by Lamar Q. Cato and opened in 1950, was the second building. In the late 1950s many more buildings opened, including classroom, dormitory, and student union facilities.

== Notable buildings ==
=== University Museum ===
Completed in 2000, the 11,000-square-foot (1,000 m^{2}) exhibition space displays a variety of historical and contemporary art. The museum is the permanent home of the Web of Life, a twenty-six-foot mural by world-renowned artist John T. Biggers, founding chairman of the TSU art department.

=== Mack H. Hannah Hall ===
Multiple TSU student-created murals are present in Hannah Hall.

The building had two 1971 murals by Harvey Johnson, a longtime TSU art instructor, about African influences in U.S. culture and mothers: Mothers of "the Fathers and the Son" and Dere's a "Han Writin on de Wall". He was educated by the founder of the TSU art school, Dr. John T. Biggers. It, as part of the Black Power movement, was Johnson's senior project, as the university at the time allowed its students to create murals on campus property. African American Vernacular English (AAVE) was a feature of the titles.

In 2008 incoming TSU president John Rudley had the murals painted over with white paint, stating that they were not high quality enough. A spokesperson initially said that the painting over was an error but Rudley later stated it was intentional. The director of the university museum, Alvia J. Wardlaw, who teaches art history, expressed disagreement with the decision. The Houston Chronicle criticized the removal in an editorial. Johnson himself expressed disappointment with the removal. Rudley later appropriated funds for possible restoration of memorials due to the negative reception.

=== Leonard H.O. Spearman Technology ===
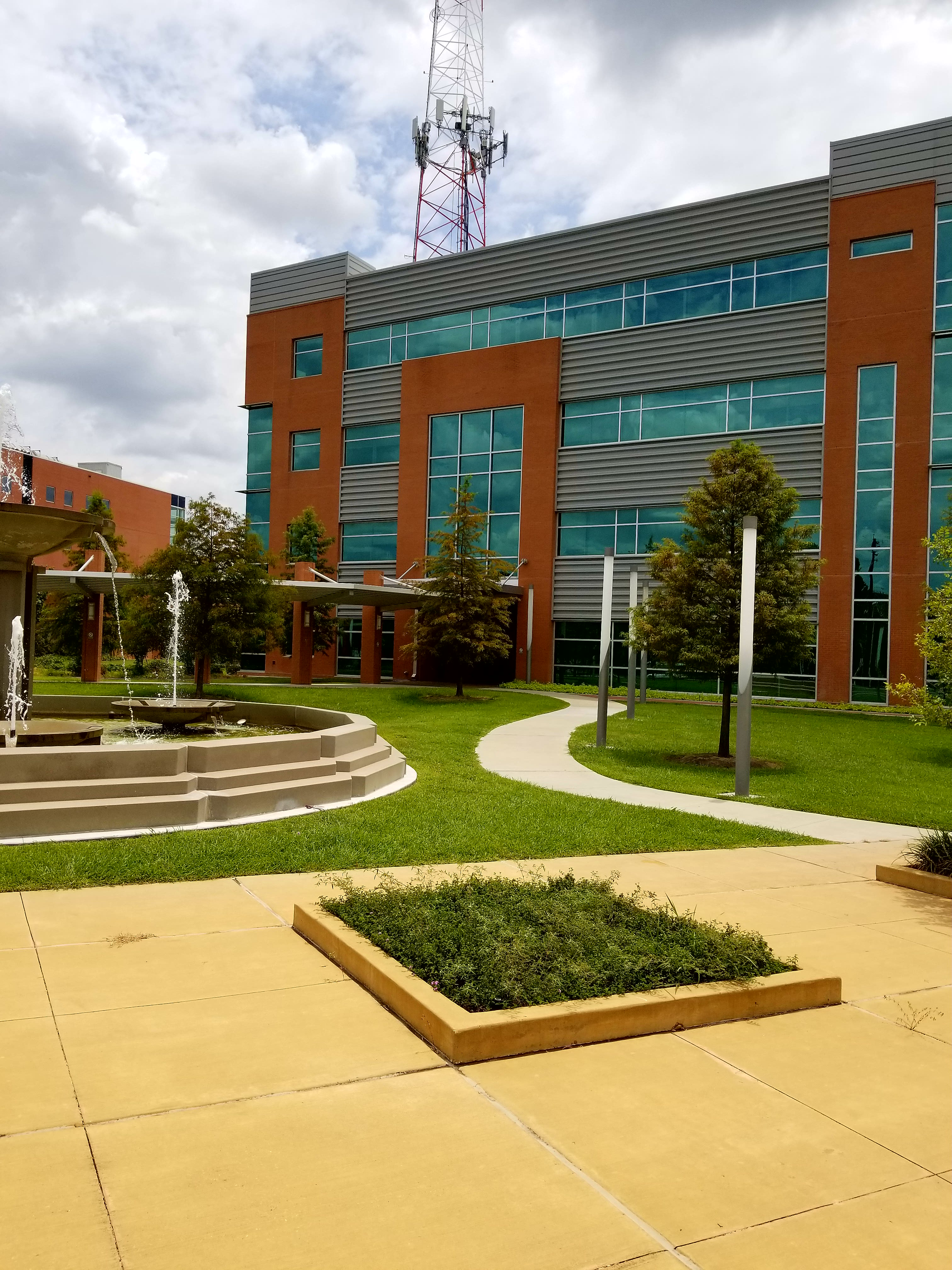
Leonard H.O. Spearman building, July 2017

In 2014, TSU unveiled a $31 million, 108,000-square-foot, four-story structure named after the school's fifth president. In addition to having 35 labs, the facility is home to a Tier 1 University Transportation Center, the Center for Transportation Training and Research, and the National Science Foundation Center for Research on Complex Networks. The departments of Engineering, Transportation Studies, Computer Science, Industrial Technology, Physics, and Aviation Science and Technology academic programs are housed in the building. TSU is the only four-year state supported university in Texas to offer a Pilot Ground School course and the first HBCU to implement a Maritime Transportation degree program.

=== Jesse H. Jones School of Business ===
Jesse H. Jones (JHJ) School of Business is located in a three-story, 76,000-square-foot building completed in 1998 and accommodates 1,600 students in undergraduate and graduate studies. The Jesse H. Jones School of Business is the first business school at a HBCU to be accredited by the Association to Advance Collegiate Schools of Business (AACSB) and been named one of the "Best Business Schools" by the Princeton Review. JHJ School of Business is consistently one of the highest ranked business schools from a public HBCU in the U.S. News & World Report rankings.

=== College of Education ===
The College of Education building consists of the Department of Counseling, the Department of Curriculum and Instruction, the Department of Educational Administration & Foundations, and the Department of Health and Kinesiology. The college has an enrollment of approximately 1,200 in undergraduate and graduate studies. In 2014, the National Council on Teacher Quality ranked TSU's College of Education 56th in the nation for best secondary education programs and gave the college a "top-ranked" distinction.

=== Barbara Jordan–Mickey Leland School of Public Affairs ===
An extensive set of curricular offerings is provided through the Barbara Jordan–Mickey Leland School of Public Affairs, which offers courses in Administration of Justice (AJ), Political Science (POLS), Public Affairs (PA), Military Science (MSCI), and Urban Planning & Environmental Policy (UPEP) on the undergraduate, graduate, or doctoral level. The school sits in an 82,000-square-foot facility completed in 2008.

==== TSU Justice Center ====
On January 22, 2018, the university published a new establishment Center for Justice Research (CJR) in the Barbara Jordan–Mickey Leland School of Public Affairs. The center is intended to create innovative solutions to criminal justice alteration and address challenges in America's criminal justice system. The award is granted by Charles Koch Foundation and Koch Industries.

=== TSU Science Center ===
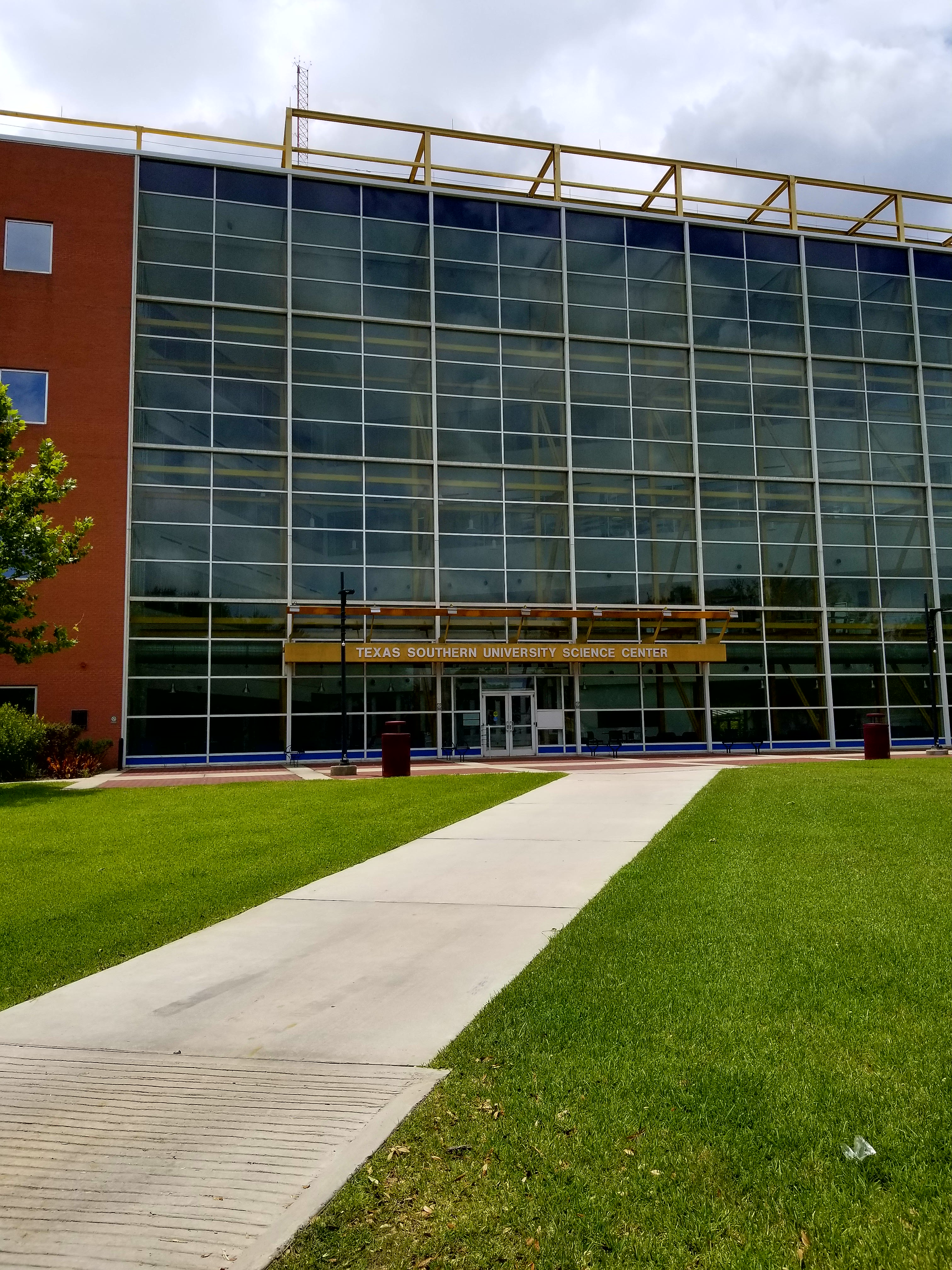
TSU Science Center, July 2017

The TSU Science Center building is home to several scholastic programs, such as the Houston Louis Stokes Alliance Minority Program (H-LSAMP). It also houses several research programs, such as the NASA University Research Center for Bio-Nanotechnology and Environmental Research (NASA URC C-BER), Maritime Transportation Studies and Research, as well as the STEM research program. TSU's NASA University Research Center (C-BER) addresses human health concerns related to crewed exploration of space. Programs like TSU's NASA University Research Center (C-BER) and participation in The Louis Stokes Alliance for Minority Preparation Program (LSAMP) support undergraduate, graduate and faculty development while helping to increase the number of US citizens receiving degrees in Science, Technology, Engineering and Mathematics (STEM) fields. The science center also houses the only doctoral degree program in environmental toxicology in Southeast Texas.

=== Spurgeon N. Gray Hall (COPHS) ===
The College of Pharmacy and Health Sciences (COPHS) is housed in the Spurgeon N. Gray Hall. COPHS has approximately 800 students. The 2016 pharmacy graduates had a 90% first-attempt pass rate on the NAPLEX which was above the national average (85%), third highest in Texas, and highest among HBCUs. TSU is one of only two public HBCUs in the United States with an accredited and comprehensive pharmacy program. COPHS is the first and only in Houston to offer a Master of Science in Health Care Administration degree.

=== Thurgood Marshall School of Law ===
The Thurgood Marshall School of Law (TMSL) is one of six public law schools in Texas and ranks as one of the most diverse law schools in the nation by U.S. News & World Report. TMSL is accredited by the American Bar Association (ABA) and a member-school of The Association of American Law Schools (AALS). Enrollment is at approximately 600 students.

The Texas College for Negroes was initially housed in Austin, Texas but was eventually transferred to Texas Southern University's campus. The creation of the Law School did not have the support of Thurgood Marshall or the NAACP. However, in 1976 now U.S. Supreme Court Justice Thurgood Marshall, agreed to name formally the "Law School of Texas Southern University," the "Thurgood Marshall School of Law."

=== Transportation ===
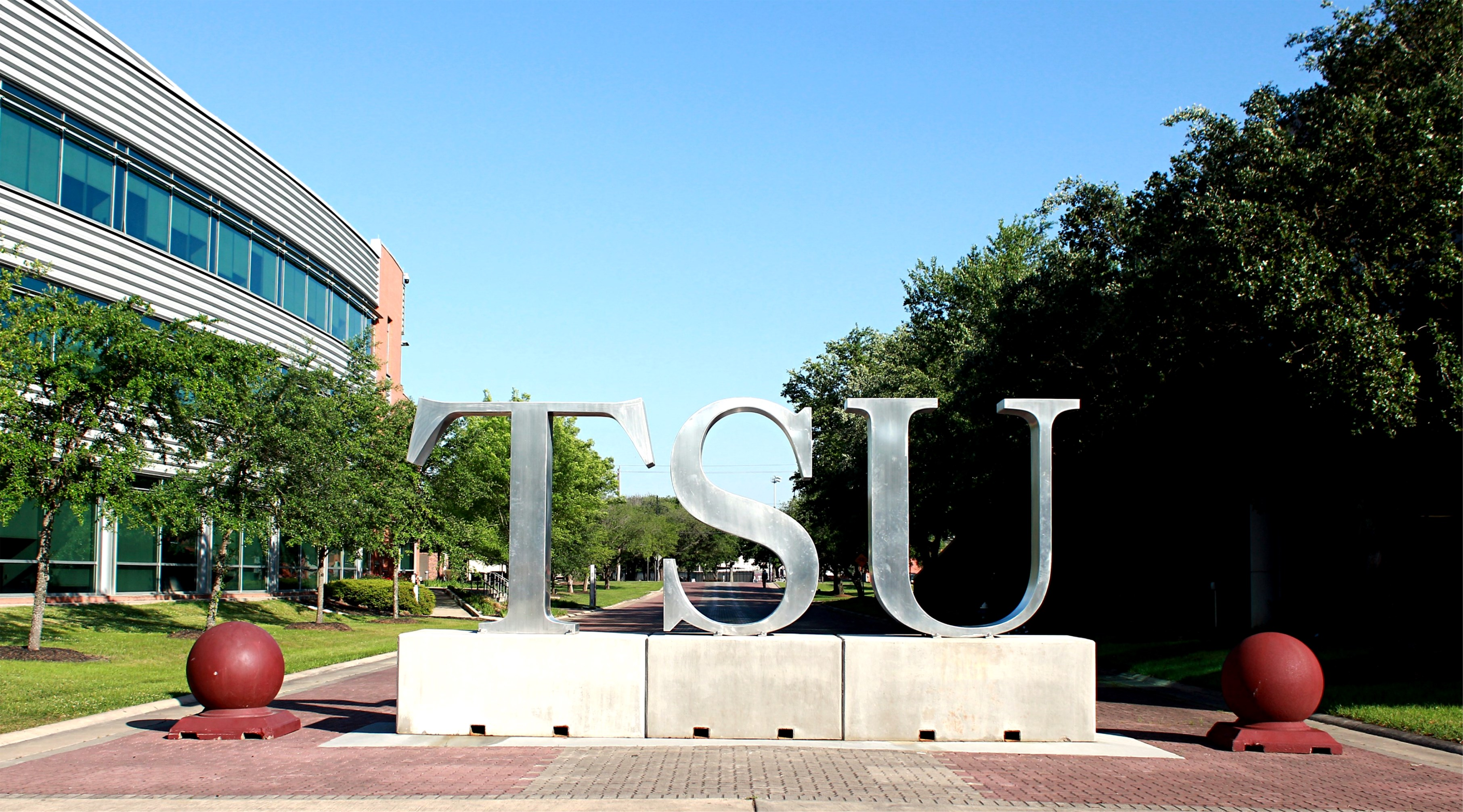
TSU entrance icon

Metropolitan Transit Authority of Harris County (METRO) operates public transportation services, including buses and the METRORail tram service, which serve the university. The METRORail Purple Line station serving the university is Robertson Stadium/UH/TSU station.

In June 2019 Texas Southern University became home to the region's first Shared Autonomous Shuttle in conjunction with a partnership between METRO, TSU and the Houston-Galveston Area Council. The shuttle can carry up to 15 passengers and travels using a pre-programmed route, equipped with a sensor and intelligent vehicle system to detect obstacles and avoid collisions.

== Academics ==
Academic rankings

National
- U.S. News & World Report: 395-435 (out of 436)
- Washington Monthly: 369

Texas Southern University offers over 100 bachelor's, master's, and doctoral degrees. Texas Southern is classified by the Carnegie Foundation as an "R2 doctoral university with high research activity".

=== Undergraduate admissions ===
In 2024, Texas Southern University accepted 93.4% of undergraduate applicants, with admission standards considered extremely easy, applicant competition considered very low, and with those enrolled having an average 3.0 high school GPA. The university does not require submission of standardized test scores, but they will be considered when submitted. Those enrolled that submitted test scores had an average 900 SAT score (48% submitting scores) or an average 17 ACT score (18% submitting scores).

=== Schools, colleges, scholastic and research programs ===
The university comprises several schools and colleges along with several scholastic and research programs.

- The Barbara Jordan-Mickey Leland School of Public Affairs: Mickey Leland Center, Barbara Jordan Institute, Emergency Management Program, Center for Justice Research
- The College of Pharmacy and Health Sciences: RCMI Institute for Biomedical and Health Disparities Research, Center for Cardiovascular Diseases, Center for Human Performance and Material Science, Center of Excellence in Health Disparities Research: Cardiovascular Disease and Stroke
- The Thurgood Marshall School of Law: Earl Carl Institute for Legal and Social Justice, Center for Legal Pedagogy, Institute for International and Immigration Law (IIIL), Center for Government
- The College of Education: TSU Charter Laboratory School
- The College of Science, Engineering, and Technology: National Transportation Security Center of Excellence for Petro-Chemical Transportation (NTSCOE-P), Center for Transportation Training and Research (CTTR), TSU NASA University Research Center for Bionanotechnology and Environmental Research (TSU NASA C-BER), Innovative Transportation Research Institute (ITRI), Houston National Summer Transportation Institute (HNSTI), Research Center in Minority Institution (RCMI) Computational Core: Advanced Computational Simulation Center, Research Center in Minority Institution (RCMI) Computational Core: Data Analysis and Visualization Center, NASA C-BER Fellows Program, NASA C-BER Scholars Program, Houston Louis Stokes Alliance for Minority Participation (H-LSAMP) Program, Science & Engineering Summer Program, Science Technology and Enhancement Program (STEP), Maritime Transportation Management and Security Program, Beyond Traffic Innovation Center and Aviation Science Management which is fully accredited by the Association of Technology, Management, and Applied Engineering (ATMAE), Federal Aviation Administration Part 141approved ground school certificate
- The Jesse H. Jones School of Business (AACSB accredited): Economic Development Center, Gerald B. Smith Center for Entrepreneurship and Executive Development, JPMorgan Chase Center for Financial Education, Kase Lawal Center for Global Trade
- The School of Communication: The Center for the Radio, Television and Print Media Professional Studies
- The College of Liberal Arts and Behavioral Sciences (COLAB): The Thomas F. Freeman Center for Forensic Excellence, The Confucius Institute (education partnership with China)
- The College of Transdisciplinary Studies
- The Thomas F. Freeman Honors College (formerly the Frederick Douglass Honors Program)
- The Graduate School
- The Weekend College: Attorney Ricky Anderson Entertainment Law Institute, Mathew Knowles Institute

=== Libraries ===
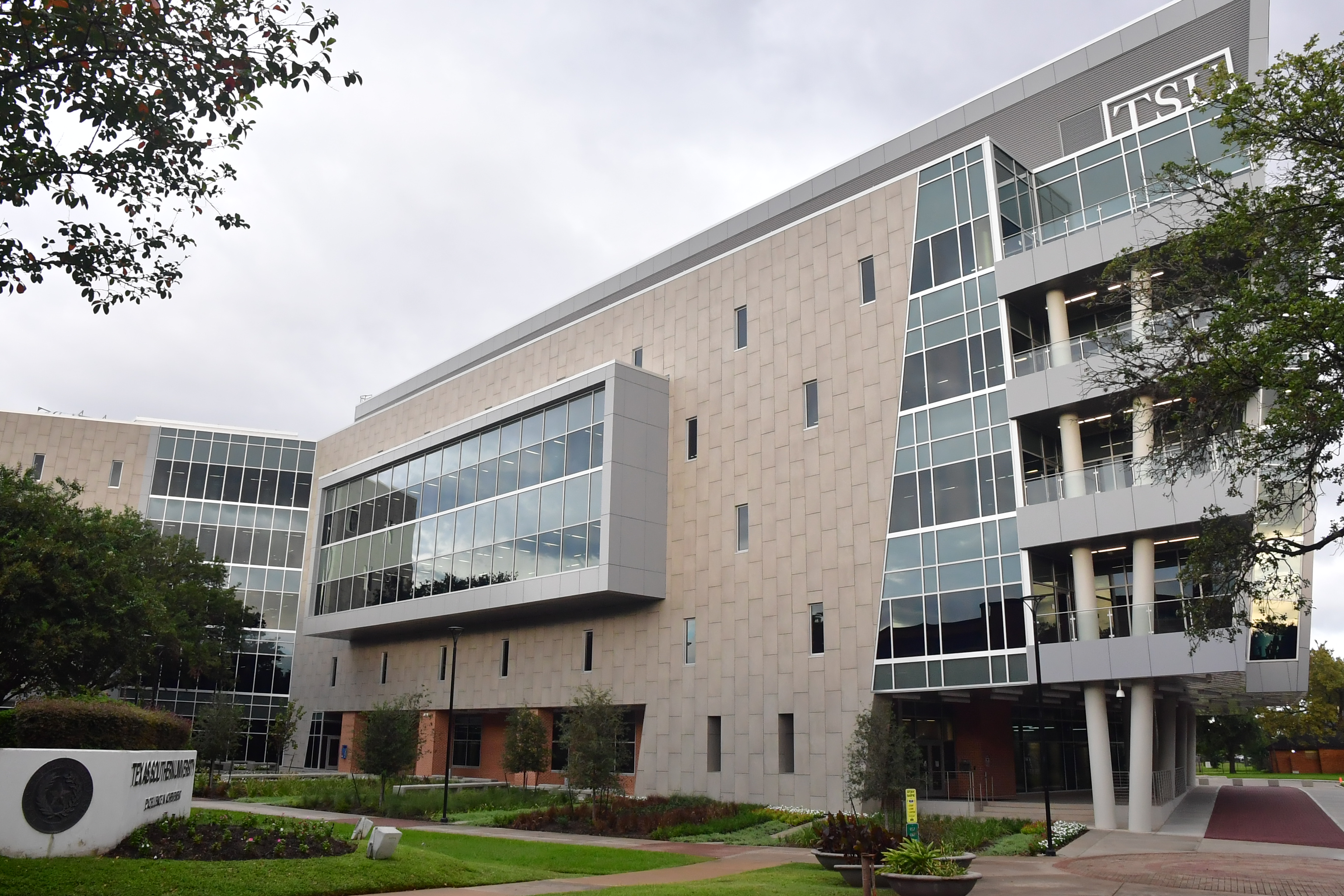
The Library Learning Center, September 2019

Texas Southern University's main library is the Library Learning Center. The Library Learning Center is home to the Thomas F. Freeman Honors College, computer labs, study rooms, tutorial services, an African Art Gallery, The Heartman Collection, and many types of valuable archives.

The Thurgood Marshall School of Law building also houses an extensive library.

== Demographics ==
Undergraduate demographics as of Fall 2023
Race and ethnicity	Total
Black	86%
Hispanic	7%
Two or more races	3%
Asian	1%
International student	1%
White	1%
Economic diversity
Low-income (Note: The percentage of students who received an income-based federal Pell grant intended for low-income students.)	71%
Affluent (Note: The percentage of students who are a part of the American middle class at the bare minimum.)	29%

As of fall 2022, approximately 83% of the student body are Texas residents. The top three feeder states are California (259), Louisiana (209), Georgia (93). The top three countries of origin (outside the U.S.) are Nigeria (58), The Bahamas (36), and Saudi Arabia (15). 64% of the student body identify as female, 36% identify as male.

== Student life ==
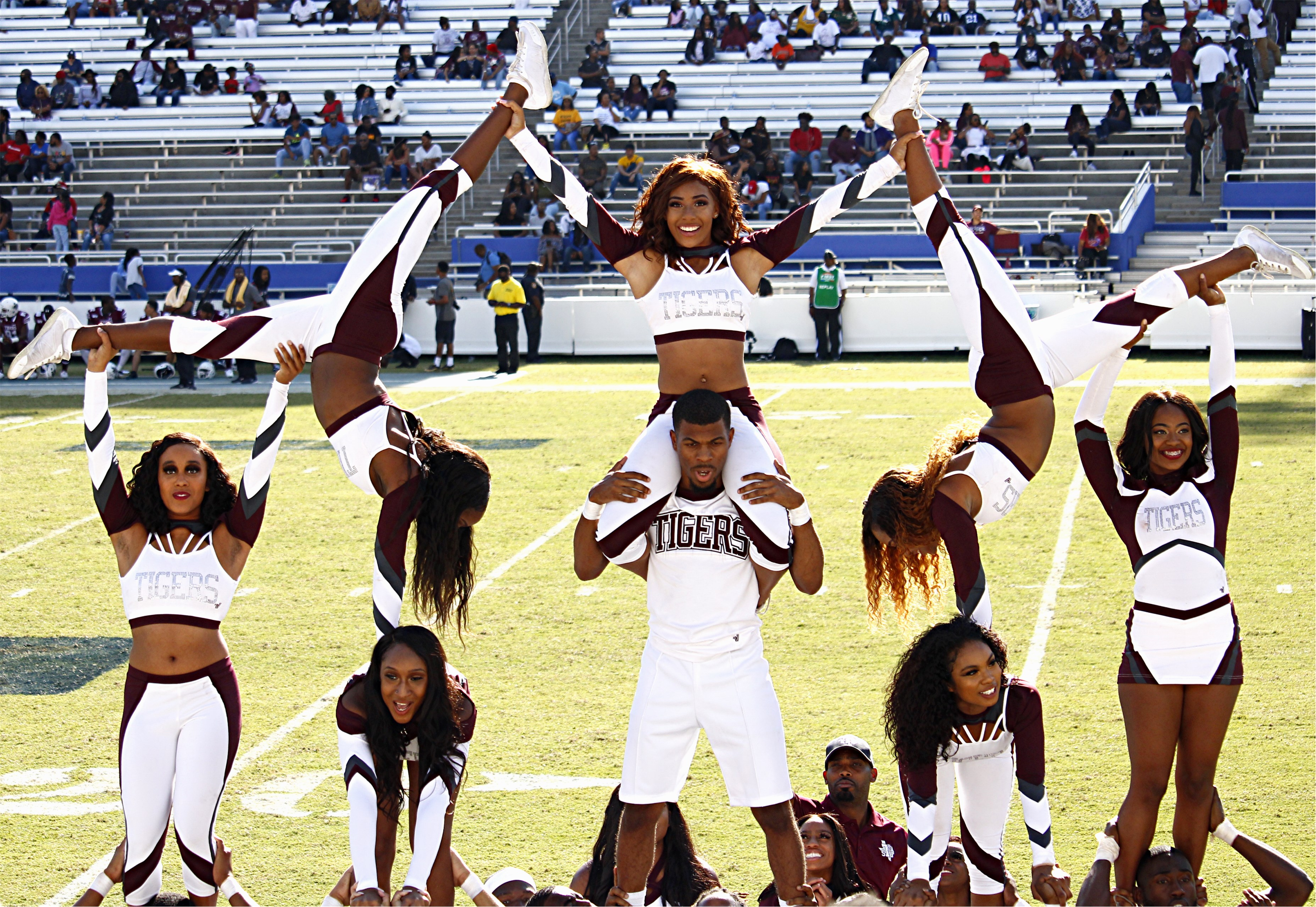
TSU cheerleaders at the State Fair Showdown, October 2019

Some of TSU's over 180 student organizations include the TSU Royal Court, TSU Cheerleaders, Debate Team, Psi Chi Honor Society, all nine organizations of the National Pan-Hellenic Council, Students in Free Enterprise, Student Business Leadership Organization (SBLO), Living Testimony Gospel Ministry, TSU Dance Company, HER TSU, Women of GOLD, CSL (Caribbean Student Organization), Boys to Men, Campus PALS, Collegiate 100, Hispanic Student Association (HSA), African Student Association (ASA), California Club, Midwest Club, Louisiana Club, Political Science Club, National Society of Black Engineers, Pre-Law Society, Pre-Alumni Association, University Program Council (UPC), and Student Government Association (SGA).

=== Debate team ===
The Texas Southern debate team was founded by professor and coach Thomas Freeman in 1949. Freeman led the team for more than 60 years as the team rose to national prominence, according to his obituary in the New York Times. He is credited for training notable leaders such as former U.S. Congresswoman Barbara Jordan, and civil rights activist Martin Luther King Jr. while serving as a visiting professor at Morehouse College. He retired in 2017 and died on June 6, 2020.

=== Ocean of Soul ===
Texas Southern's marching band, the Ocean of Soul, has won numerous awards and performed at Super Bowls, the Stellar Awards, many parades, as well as NBA and Houston Texans games. The 200-plus-member band alumni include Grammy award-winning jazz saxophonist Kirk Whalum, Grammy award winner DJ Hollygrove and Multiplatinum producer June James. The Ocean of Soul is complemented by The Motion of The Ocean, a female danceline which was featured on America's Best Dance Crew.

=== Athletics ===
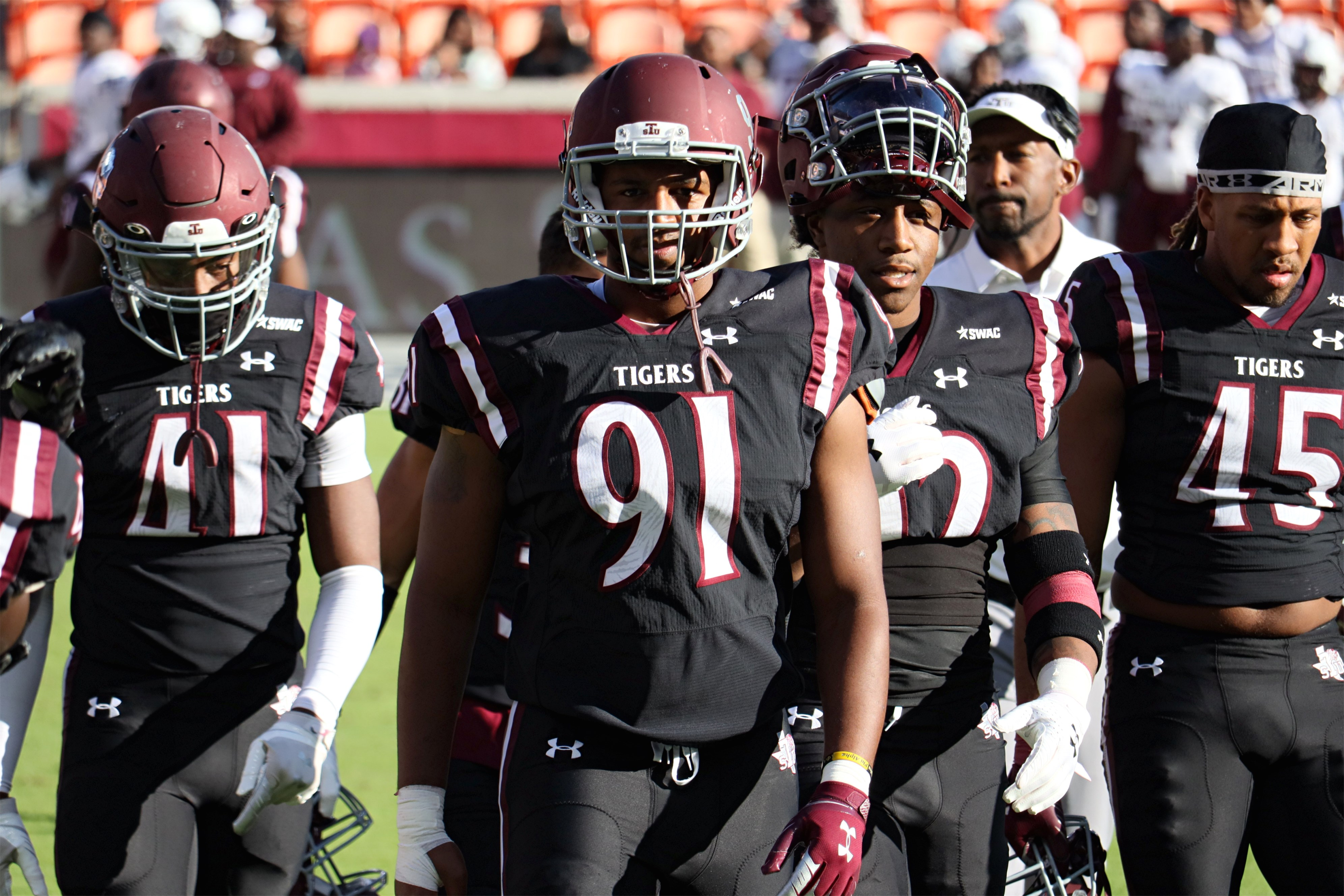
Texas Southern Tigers vs. Alabama A&M University at PNC Stadium in November 2021

Texas Southern sports teams participate in NCAA Division I (Championship Subdivision for football) in the Southwestern Athletic Conference (SWAC). Texas Southern is part of the Western Division in SWAC divisional sports.

Men's varsity sports include baseball, basketball, football, golf, and track and field. Women's varsity sports include basketball, bowling, cross country, golf, soccer, softball, dance (TSU Tiger Sensations), cheer, track and field, and volleyball.

Texas Southern's most well-known rival is Prairie View A&M.

=== Athletic facilities ===
- Shell Energy Stadium – The $95 million 22,000-seat stadium in nearby East Downtown is the permanent home of Tiger Football.
- Health and Physical Education Arena (H&PE Arena) – An 8,100-seat multi-purpose arena (largest arena in the SWAC). Built in 1989, it is home to the annual graduation ceremonies, Tiger basketball, Lady Tiger basketball and volleyball.
- Alexander Durley Stadium – The 5,500-seat stadium is the home of TSU soccer games and the annual TSU Relays.
- TSU Recreation and Wellness Center – Opened in 2005, the TSU Recreation and Wellness Center has served the students of TSU and the Third Ward community. The facility is open to all TSU students, community members and alumni. Serving approximately 5,000 students yearly and community members, amenities included are a full basketball court, indoor track, weight room, dance studio, study/lounge area, swimming pool, and a women's resource center.

==== Tiger and Lady Tiger basketball ====
As of 2024, Texas Southern men's basketball leads the SWAC in tournament titles (11) and made 11 NCAA Division I men's basketball tournament appearances.

==== Tiger football ====
As of 2024, Texas Southern football has won three SWAC titles (1956, 1958, 1968) and one national HBCU title (1958).

==== Tiger baseball ====
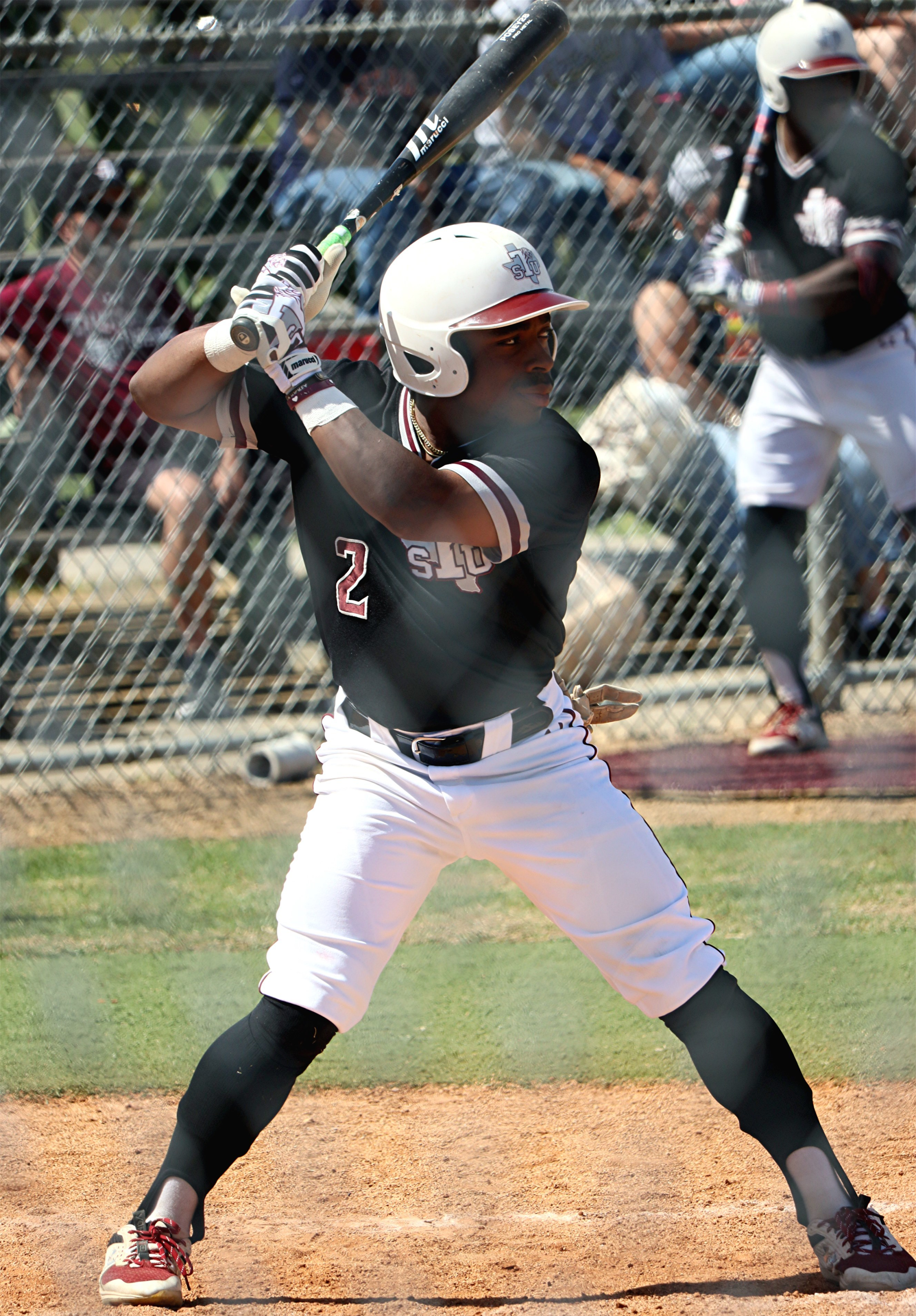
A Tigers baseball player batting in a game at MacGregor Park, March 2022

The Texas Southern Baseball team competes in the SWAC and plays home games at MacGregor Park. They were back-to-back conference champions in 2017 and 2018. They won the SWAC baseball tournament in 2004, 2008, and 2015. Michael Robertson was hired as head coach in 2009.

==== Tiger volleyball ====
Texas Southern Volleyball competes at the HP&E Arena. Texas Southern University Volleyball won their first SWAC ring in 1989 against Southern University (3–0). Prior to receiving rings, the Volleyball Team won SWAC Championships in 1986 & 1988. Then in 1990 & 1991 they returned with another ring against Prairie View (3–0). The last SWAC championship Lady Tiger Volleyball received was in 1994 against Prairie View (3–0).

==== Tiger softball ====
Texas Southern Softball team competes at Memorial Park in Houston. The Lady Tigers softball team won their first and second SWAC conference championship back to back years in 2014 and 2015. The Lady Tigers then went on to win their third SWAC championship in 2017. The Lady Tigers have also won the western division championship of the conference nine consecutive years. The Lady Tigers are coached by Worley Barker and assisted by Jasmin Hutchinson

=== KTSU 90.9 FM ===
In addition to serving as a training unit for TSU students, the station was established to serve the university at the program level as well as Greater Houston by presenting various types of TSU athletic, educational, cultural and social programs to a primarily listening area within a 10-mile (16 km) radius of the university. A 1973 survey indicated that radio was generally the preferred source of information of African-Americans, particularly those with less than a high school education. By the late 1970s, the station had secured an ample audience and programming increased in scope. At the same time, the station increased its power range from 10 watts to 18,500 watts. According to the Arbitron Rating Service (ARS), KTSU has an audience of 244,700 listeners and is number one overall of Houston and Galveston stations for its Sunday format and its Friday format of Golden Oldies.

== Notable alumni ==
Notable TSU alumni

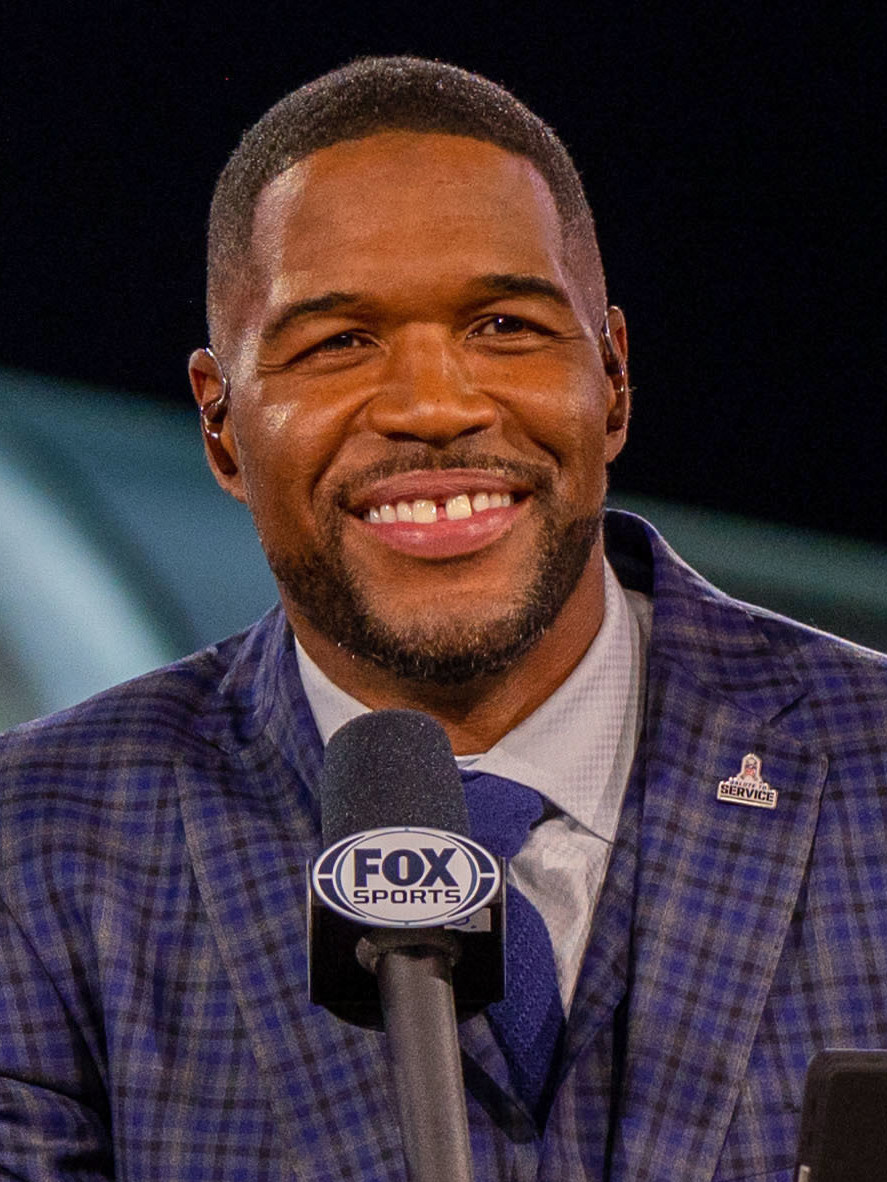
Michael Strahan
NFL Hall of Famer, actor, entrepreneur, and Emmy-winning TV personality

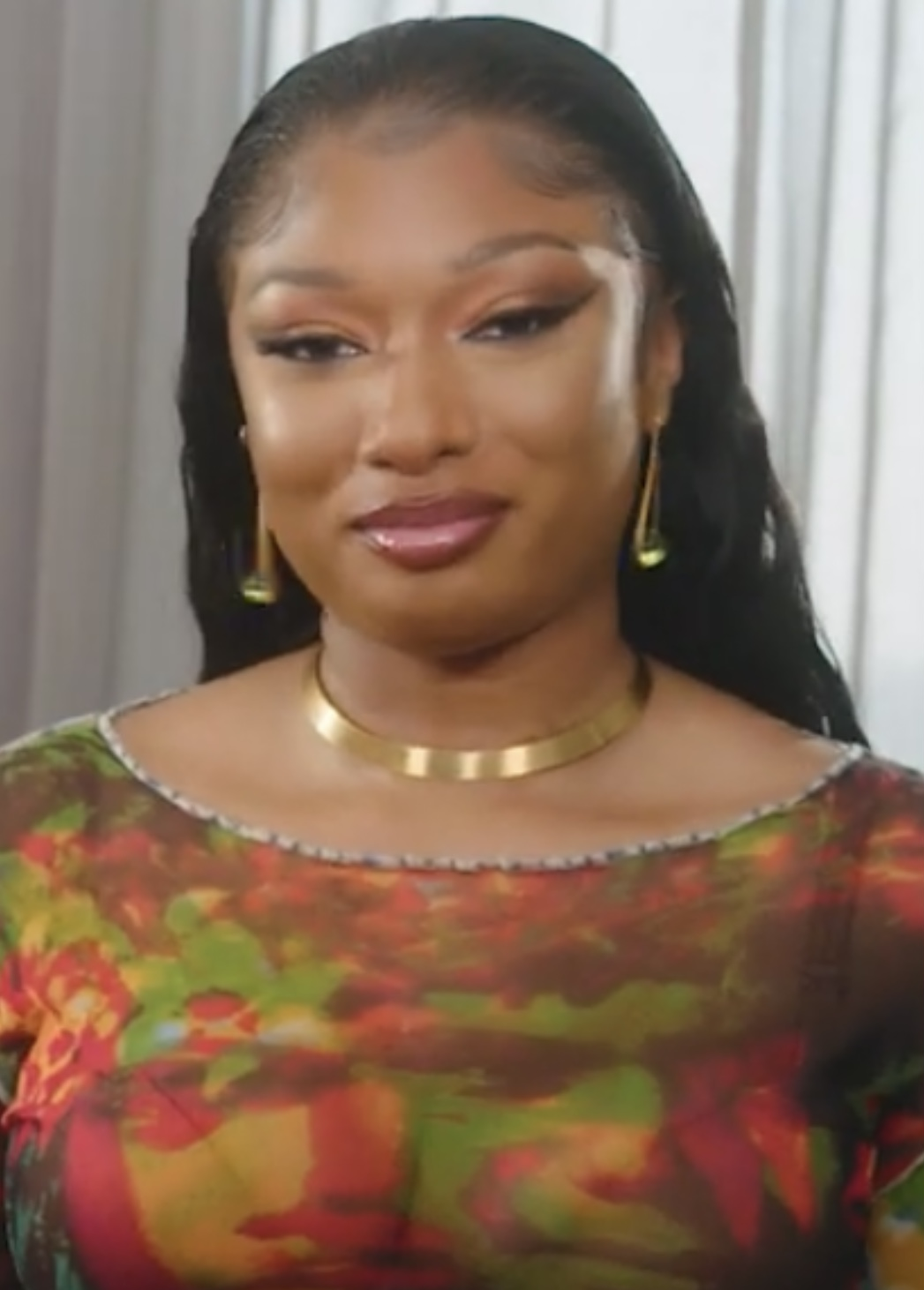
Megan Thee Stallion
Grammy-winning rapper and actress

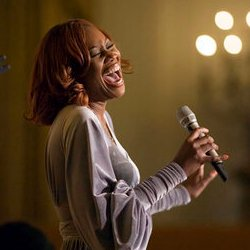
Yolanda Adams
Grammy-winning singer, actress, and former elementary school teacher

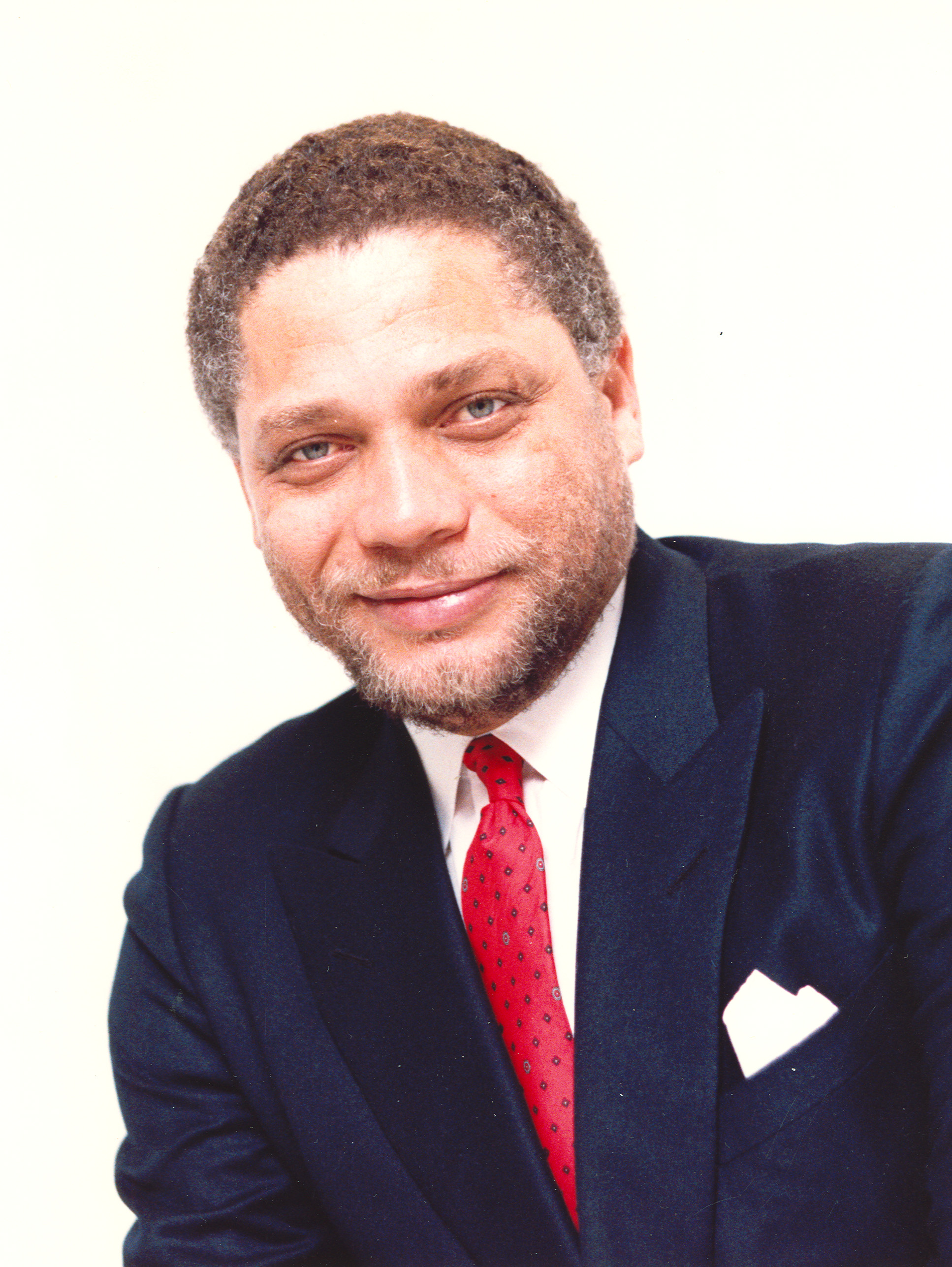
Mickey Leland
U.S. Congressman and prominent anti-poverty activist

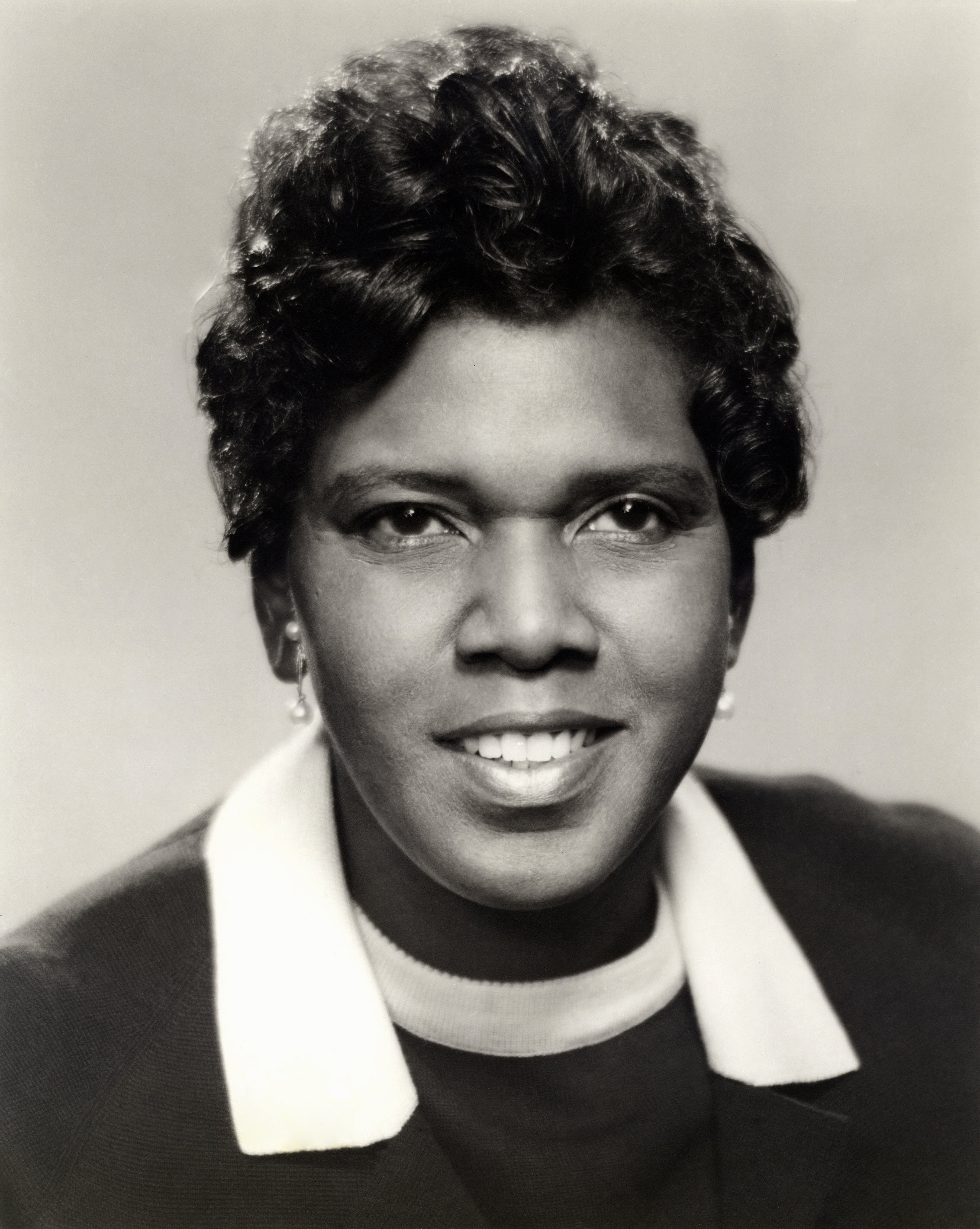
Barbara Jordan
First African-American elected to the Texas Senate after Reconstruction and first Southern African-American woman elected to the U.S. Congress

Name	Class year	Notability	References
George A. McElroy	1956	Pioneering journalist/educator/activist	
Wilton Felder	1961	Saxophonist and bass player (a founding member of The Crusaders)	
Senfronia Thompson	1961	Member of the Texas House of Representatives from the 141st district (Houston)	
Art Strahan	1964–1965	Former NFL defensive end for the Houston Oilers and Atlanta Falcons, former COFL defensive end	
Joseph Dunbar	1966	Medical researcher	
Jim Hines	1968	2 Gold medals at 1968 Olympics, First sprinter to officially break the 10-second barrier in the 100 meters, and former NFL player	
Lloyd Mumphord	1969	Former NFL defensive back	
Warren Wells	1969	Former NFL wide receiver	
June James	attended	Multiplatinum producer of YFN Lucci’s Key to the Streets and Everyday We Lit, former member of Ocean of Soul	
Kenneth M. Hoyt	1969 and 1972	Nominated by President Ronald Reagan to a seat on the United States District Court for the Southern District of Texas. He was the second African-American to serve as federal judge in Texas. He took senior status in 2013.	
Ernie Holmes	1971	Former NFL defensive tackle for the Pittsburgh Steelers, original member of the famed Steel Curtain defensive line, two-time Super Bowl Champion	
Jennifer Holliday	Attended	Singer and cast member of Dreamgirls	
Roberto R. Alonzo	1984	Texas State Representative from District 104 (Dallas)	
Barbara Mallory Caraway	1978	Former Member of the Texas House of Representatives from District 110 (Dallas)	
DJ hollygrove	attended	Grammy Award for Best Gospel The Urban Hymnal, member of The Chopstars	
Ruth McClendon		African-American Democratic member of the Texas House of Representatives from San Antonio since 1996; former member of the San Antonio City Council and Mayor Pro Tem from 1993 to 1996; former juvenile probation officer	
Gilbert Pena	1996	2015 Hispanic Republican member of the Texas House of Representatives from District 144 in Pasadena; graduated in Political Science at the age of forty-seven	
Morris Overstreet	1975	First African-American to be elected to statewide office in Texas. He served on the state's highest appellate court from 1990 to 1998	
Leslie D. King	1973	Mississippi Supreme Court Justice	
Kirk Whalum	1982	Jazz saxophonist	
Kase Lukman Lawal	1976	Chairman and CEO of CAMAC International Corporation and chairman of Allied Energy Corporation in Houston, Texas, Chairman/Chief Executive Officer, CAMAC HOLDINGS;[1] vice chairman, Port of Houston Authority Commission	
Rodney Ellis	1975	Harris County Commissioner Precinct 1 (2017–present); Former member of the Texas Senate, District 13 1990–2016 and the Houston City Council District D (1983–1990) (Houston)	
Sylvia Garcia	1978	Member of the Texas Senate, District 6 (Houston)	
Harry E. Johnson	1986	President and CEO, from its 2002 establishment, of the Washington, D.C. Martin Luther King, Jr. National Memorial Project Foundation, Inc.	
Jarvis Johnson	1996	Member of the Texas House of Representatives, District 139 (Houston) since January 2017; Former member of the Houston City Council from the B District 2005-11	
Tony Wyllie	1993	Senior Vice President for the Washington Redskins. He has previously worked as an Assistant Director of Public Relations for the St. Louis Rams, the Director of Public Relations for the Tennessee Titans, and Vice President of Communications for the Houston Texans	
Ron Reynolds	1995	Member of the Texas House of Representatives from District 27 since 2011; lawyer in Missouri City	
Lloyd C. A. Wells		Sports photographer and civil rights activist on the behalf of black athletes	
Robert Taylor		Winner of gold medal in 4x100 m relay at the 1972 Summer Olympics	
Greg Briggs	1991	Former NFL defensive back	
Ken Burrough	1970	Former NFL wide receiver	
Brett Maxie	1985	Former NFL defensive back and current NFL assistant coach	
Allen Lyday	1970	Former NFL defensive back	
Julius Adams	1971	Former NFL defensive lineman	ju
Arthur Cox	1982–1983	Former NFL tight end	
Donald Narcisse	1986–1987	Former Canadian Football League wide receiver. Canadian Football Hall of Fame inductee, 2010	
Markus Howell	1999–2000	Former CFL wide receiver and current CFL Assistant Coach	
Alberto White	1992-2001	Former NFL, CFL, AFL, XFL - Professional football player	
Warren Bone	1985–1986	Former NFL player	
Conrad Murray	1977	former cardiologist who was the personal physician of Michael Jackson at the time of his death in 2009.	
Belvin Perry	1977	Chief Judge of the Ninth Judicial Circuit in Orlando, Florida, and presided over the Casey Anthony trial.	
Ronald C. Green	1996	City Controller of Houston and a former member of the Houston City Council	
Oliver Celestin	2002	Former NFL defensive back	
Cortez Hankton	2002	Former NFL wide receiver and current assistant football coach at Louisiana State University	
Delita Martin	2002	Printmaker received her BFA in Fine Art from Texas Southern University. She has exhibited both nationally and internationally.	
Joseph Anderson	2011	NFL wide receiver	
Tray Walker	2015	Former Baltimore Ravens cornerback	
Marvin Jones	2017	2 basketball player in the Israeli Basketball Premier League	
Jeremy Combs	2019	2 basketball player for Israeli team Hapoel Ramat Gan Givatayim	
DJ Candlestick	2019	Official remix DJ for Drake and OVO Sound, member of The Chopstars	
Joirdon Nicholas	2023	basketball player in the Israeli Basketball Premier League	

== Notable faculty ==
Name	Department	Notability	Reference
Mathew Knowles	Communications	Father of Beyoncé Knowles-Carter and Solange Knowles, founder of Music World Entertainment, former manager for the members of Destiny's Child and Solange, and adjunct instructor in the School of Communication and Jesse H. Jones School of Business.Co- founder of the Entertainment and Recording Industry Management Program	
Robert D. Bullard	Sociology	Well-noted scholar of environmental justice	
Sunny Edet Ohia	Education	Nigerian pharmacologist	
Rod Paige	Education	Former US Secretary of Education 2001–2005; at TSU served as head football coach, athletic director, education professor, and dean of education	

== See also ==
- Black mecca
- Third Ward
- Emancipation Park (Houston)
- History of African Americans in Texas
- History of the African Americans in Houston
- Riverside Terrace
