= June James (physician) =

Canadian pediatrician and professor

- Born: Trinidad and Tobago
- Education: University of Manitoba
- Occupations: Physician; Pediatrician; Professor
- Honours: Order of Manitoba

June James is a Canadian pediatrician and professor at the University of Manitoba. James was the first Black woman admitted to the University of Manitoba College of Medicine. She was president of the College of Physicians and Surgeons of Manitoba from 2002 to 2003 and has received multiple awards for her work, including YWCA Woman of the Year Award (1981), the Queen Elizabeth 50th Jubilee Medal, and the Order of Manitoba (2004).

== Early life ==
James was born in Trinidad and Tobago and immigrated to Canada on her own in 1960. She left her parents and four siblings behind to achieve her goal.

== Education ==
James attended the University of Manitoba, earning a bachelor of science (1963), bachelor of science in medicine (1967) and Doctor of Medicine (1967). She was the first Black woman admitted to the University's Medical College. James also holds specialist certificates in pediatrics, allergy, asthma, and immunology.

== Career ==
James began her career as a Pediatric Fellow in hematology and oncology before moving to asthma, allergy, and immunology in 1972. James has worked as a consultant in the department of Allergy and Immunology at the Winnipeg Clinic, as well as with the Children's Centre at the Health Sciences Centre in Winnipeg. She is a founder of the Manitoba Allergy Society and developed Manitoba's first Family Asthma Program - a six week program which provided families of children with Asthma with training on breathing exercises and how to use an inhaler. The program helped to reduce the number of children being hospitalized for Asthma and increased the number of children with Asthma participating in recreational sports, which was previously discouraged by doctors in a hospital setting.

James is also an assistant professor at the Max Rady College of Medicine with the University of Manitoba.

James has served on a number of boards and committees. She served as president of the College of Physicians and Surgeons of Manitoba from 2002 to 2003 and is a Fellow of the American Academy of Allergy, Asthma and Immunology. She previously served as president of the Manitoba Museum (1998–2000) and president of the Manitoba Museum Foundation (2000–2002). James co-founded the Congress of Black Women of Manitoba and was chair of the Canadian Scholarship Trust Foundation and the Winnipeg Foundation. She has worked with the Harambee Housing Co-op to construct affordable housing units.

== Awards and recognition ==
- YWCA Woman of Distinction Award (1981)
- Queen Elizabeth Golden Jubilee Medal (2002)
- Order of Manitoba (2004)
- 100 Accomplished Black Canadian Women (2020)
- Manitoba Women Trailblazer Award (2021)
