= Joey Jamison =

American football player (born 1978)

No. 41
- Positions: Wide receiver, return specialist

Personal information
- Born: October 12, 1978 (age 48); Jacksonville, Florida, U.S.

Career information
- High school: Samuel W. Wolfson (Jacksonville)
- College: Texas Southern
- NFL draft: 2000: 5th round, 151st overall pick

Career history
- Green Bay Packers (2000)*
- * Offseason or practice squad member only

Joey Jamison (born October 12, 1978) is an American former professional football player who was a wide receiver and return specialist in the National Football League (NFL). He was selected 151st overall by the Green Bay Packers in the fifth round of the 2000 NFL draft. He played college football for the Texas Southern Tigers.
