= Tray Walker =

American football player (1992–2016)

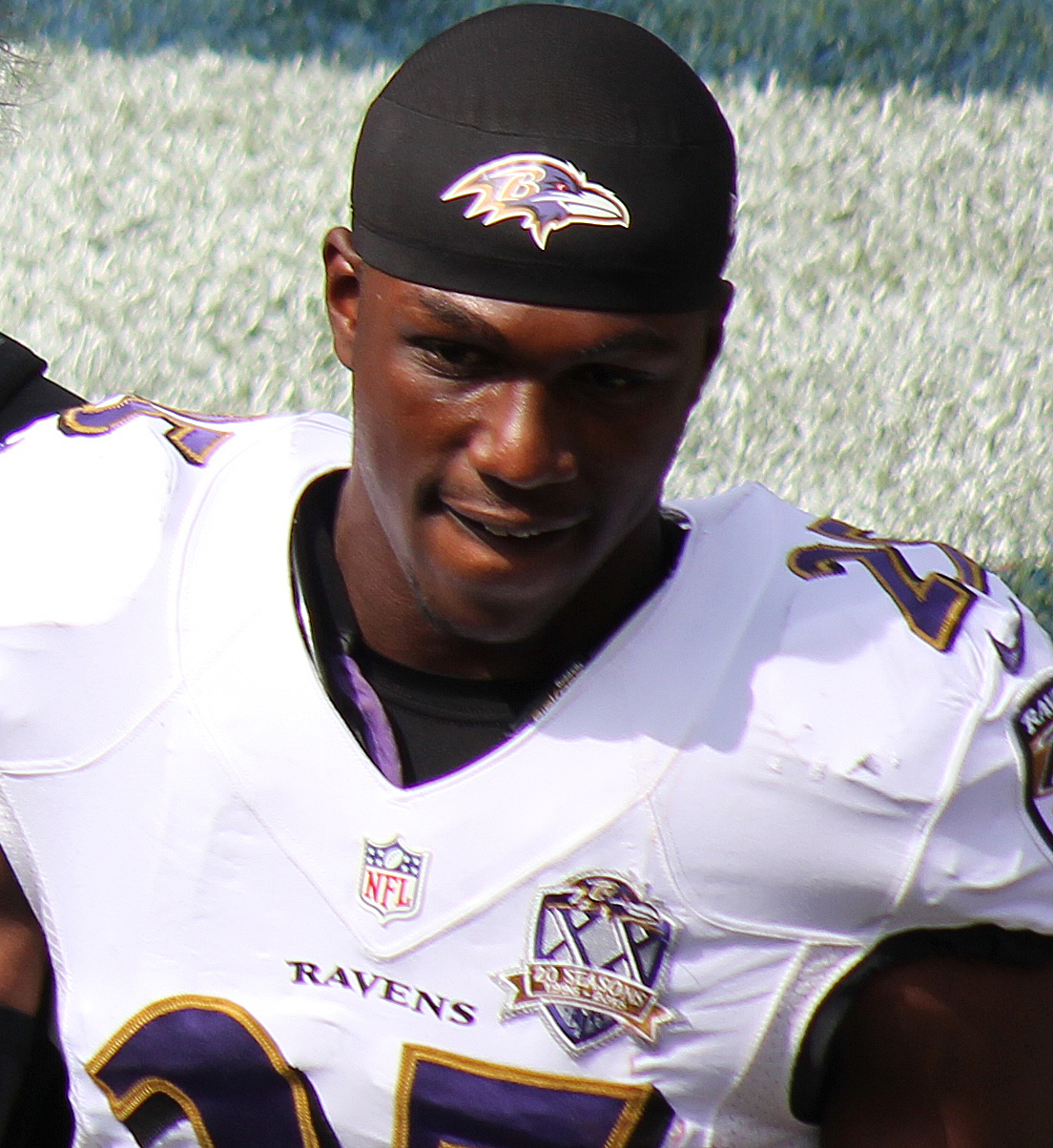
- Walker with the Baltimore Ravens in 2015

No. 25
- Position: Cornerback

Personal information
- Born: August 5, 1992; Miami, Florida, U.S.
- Died: March 18, 2016 (aged 23); Miami, Florida, U.S.
- Listed height: 6 ft 2 in (1.88 m)
- Listed weight: 199 lb (90 kg)

Career information
- High school: Miami Northwestern
- College: Texas Southern (2011–2014)
- NFL draft: 2015: 4th round, 136th overall pick

Career history
- Baltimore Ravens (2015)

Career NFL statistics
- Total tackles: 2
- Stats at Pro Football Reference

Tray Walker (August 5, 1992 – March 18, 2016) was an American professional football player who was a cornerback for the Baltimore Ravens of the National Football League (NFL). He played college football for the Texas Southern Tigers, and was selected by the Ravens in the fourth round of the 2015 NFL draft, ultimately playing only one season with the team before his death.

Walker died on March 18, 2016, from injuries sustained from a dirt bike accident on Florida streets.

== Early life ==
A native of Miami, Walker attended the city's Northwestern High School, where he played cornerback, punter and goalline receiver for the Bulls, earning honorable mention All-Dade County as a senior. Walker was teammates with Teddy Bridgewater and Amari Cooper. Unrecognized by recruiting analysts and football scouts, Walker's only scholarship offer came from Texas Southern University.

== College career ==
In his true freshman year at Texas Southern, Walker recorded 22 tackles (17 solo), three interceptions (59 return yards) and a career-best 11 deflected passes.

In his senior year, he earned Second-team All-Southwestern Athletic Conference (2014).

== Professional career ==
Walker was selected in the fourth round of the 2015 NFL draft by the Baltimore Ravens with the 136th overall pick, making him the highest draft selection from Texas Southern since Joe Burch in 1994. In his only professional season, Walker played in eight games, with his primary contributions going toward special teams for the Ravens, including two tackles.

== Death ==
On the evening of March 17, 2016, Walker was riding a dirt bike on the street and was fatally injured when he collided with a Ford Escape at an intersection in Liberty City, Florida. He was transported to Jackson Memorial Hospital in Miami, Florida, in critical condition after sustaining serious head injuries and spending much of the night in surgery. He died the following day from his injuries. According to reports Walker was riding at night without a helmet, had no headlights on, and was wearing dark clothing.

Walker's funeral was held on March 26, 2016, in Miami.

== See also ==
- List of gridiron football players who died during their careers
