= Texas Southern Tigers football =

American college football organization

| 2026 Texas Southern Tigers football team |
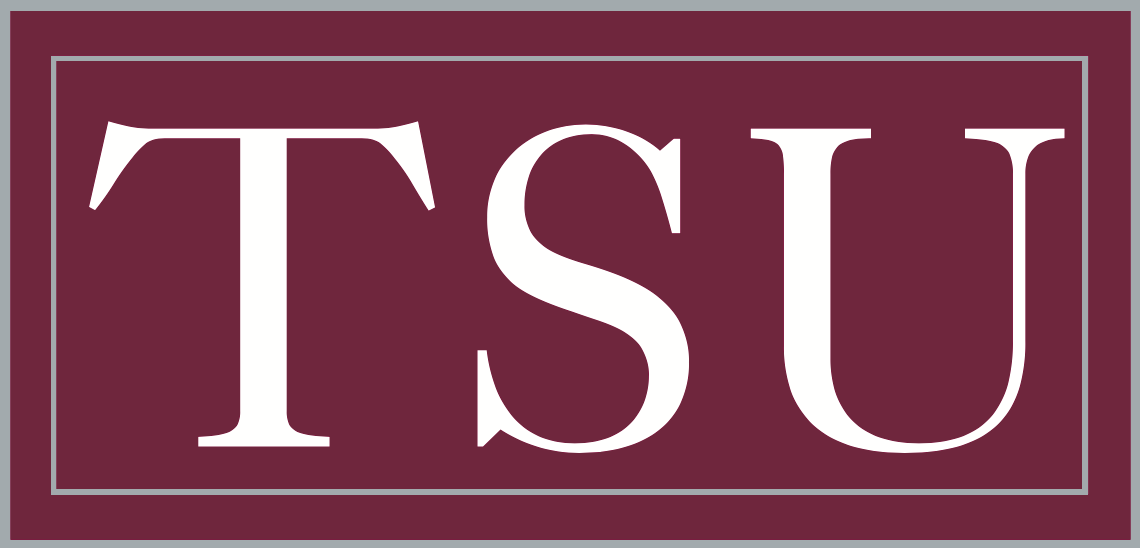
- First season: 1947; 79 years ago
- Head coach: Cris Dishman; 3rd season, 11–11 (.500)
- Location: Houston, Texas
- Stadium: W.W. Thorne Stadium
- Conference: SWAC
- Division: West
- Colors: Maroon and gray
- All-time record: 336–444–27 (.433)

Black college national championships
- 1952

Conference championships
- MAA: 1952 SWAC: 1956, 1968
- Rivalries: Prairie View A&M (rivalry)
- Website: tsusports.com

The Texas Southern Tigers are the college football team representing Texas Southern University, a historically black university (HBCU) in Houston. The Tigers play in the NCAA's Division I FCS as a member of the Southwestern Athletic Conference (SWAC), a conference whose members are all HBCUs. In 2012, the Tigers moved into the new Shell Energy Stadium in East Downtown, built for the city's Major League Soccer team, the Houston Dynamo. It replaced Delmar Stadium as the primary home of Tiger football. In 2026, the Tigers moved into W.W. Thorne Stadium as their new home stadium.

=== Classifications ===
- 1952–1972: NCAA College Division
- 1952–1969: NAIA
- 1970–1984: NAIA Division I
- 1973–1976: NCAA Division II
- 1977: NCAA Division I
- 1978–present: NCAA Division I-AA/FCS

=== Conference memberships ===
- 1947–1950: Independent
- 1951–1954: Midwest Athletic Association
- 1955–present: Southwestern Athletic Conference

== Football classics ==
=== Labor Day Classic ===
The Tigers compete against the Panthers of Prairie View A&M in the Labor Day Classic for the Durley-Nicks Trophy. The popular football rivalry began in 1946 but the classic was created in 1985.

== TV broadcasting ==
In July 2017, Texas Southern renewed their deal with AT&T SportsNet (formerly ROOT Sports Southwest) to televise all home football games. The cable channel reaches over 13 million households.

== Championships ==
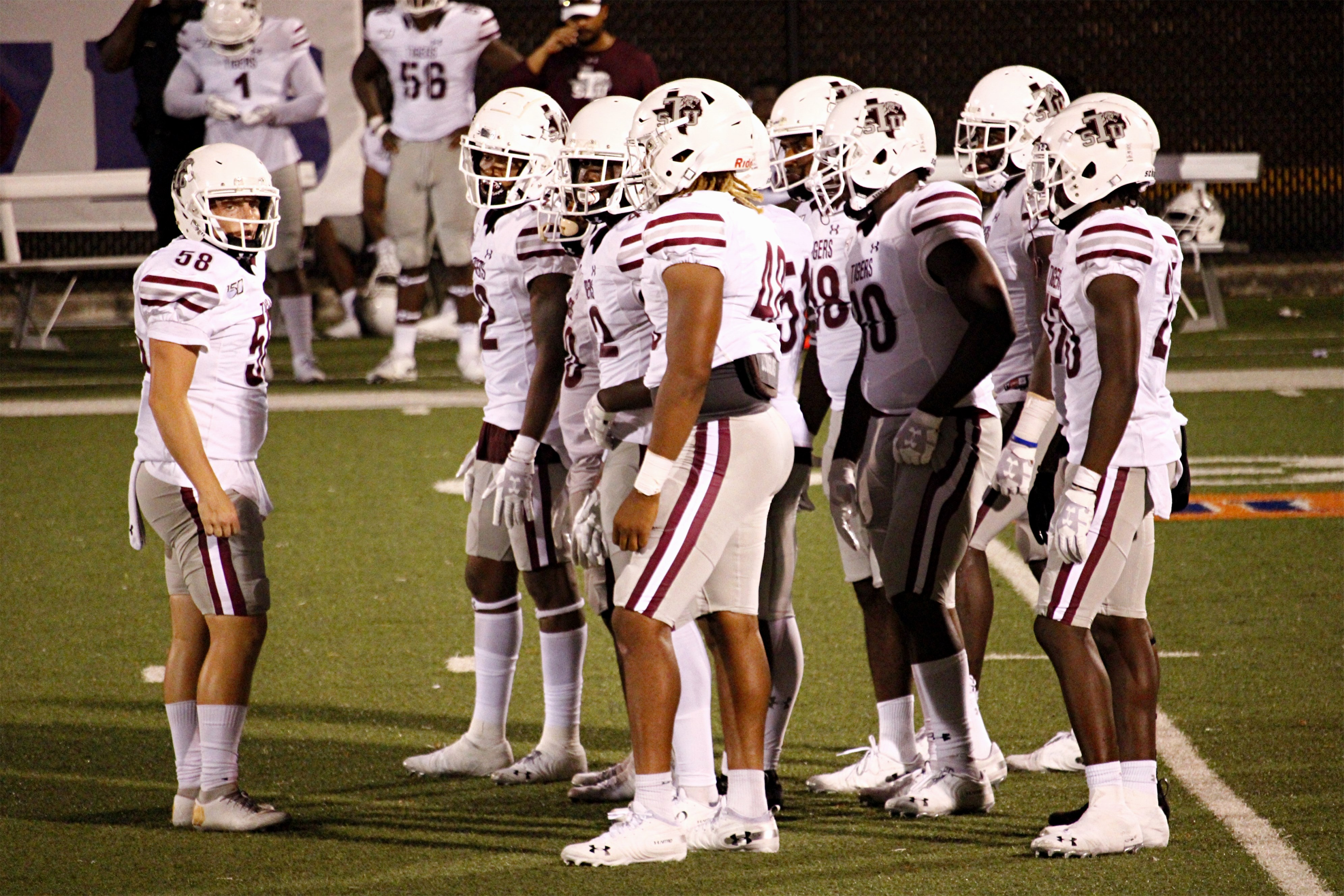
Texas Southern football players in 2019

=== National ===
| Year | Championship | Coach | Overall record | Conference |
|---|---|---|---|---|
| 1952 | Black college national | Alexander Durley | 10–0–1 | MWAA |
| 2010 | Black college national | Johnnie Cole | 9–3 | SWAC |

=== Conference championships ===
| Year | Conference | Coach | Overall record | Conference record |
|---|---|---|---|---|
| 1952† | Midwest Athletic Association | Alexander Durley | 10–0–1 | 2–0–1 |
| 1956 | Southwestern Athletic Conference | Alexander Durley | 9–2 | 5–1 |
| 1968† | Southwestern Athletic Conference | Clifford Paul | 6–4 | 6–1 |
| 2010* | Southwestern Athletic Conference | Johnnie Cole | 9–3 | 8–1 |
| Total conference championships: | | | 3 (1 vacated) | |
† Denotes co-champions * Denotes vacated title

== Alumni in the NFL ==
Over 60 Texas Southern alumni have played in the NFL or AFL, including:

- Michael Strahan°°
- Art Strahan
- Tray Walker
- Julius Adams
- Melvin Baker
- Ken Burrough
- Greg Briggs
- Ernie Calloway
- Arthur Cox
- John Douglas
- James Ford
- Harold Hart
- W. K. Hicks
- Winston Hill°°
- Ernie Holmes
- Kevin Johnson
- Brett Maxie
- Will Moore
- Cortez Hankton
- Jim Sorey
- John White
- Jim Young
- Darvin Kidsy
- Joseph Rogers
- Oliver Celestin
- Andy Olemgbe
- Joey Jamison

°° Pro Football Hall of Fame inductee

== 2012 NCAA sanctions ==
In October 2012, the NCAA found Texas Southern University guilty of repeated rules violations in 13 sports over a seven-year period from 2005 to 2012. The most serious violations occurred within the football and men's basketball programs, involving academic fraud, illicit benefits given to student athletes, lying on the part of coaches, and lying to the NCAA about previously self-imposed sanctions.

Prior to the NCAA's verdict, the school had taken numerous corrective measures—including the April 2011 firing of football coach Johnnie Cole (2010 SWAC Football Coach of the Year) and vacating every game that the Tiger football team had won from 2006 to 2010 - including the 2010 SWAC Championship, their first championship in 42 years.

The NCAA banned TSU's football team from the 2013 and 2014 postseason.

== Future non-conference opponents ==
Announced schedules as of October 14, 2026

| 2027 | 2028 |
|---|---|
| at Tulsa | at Texas State |
| at Texas A&M | |

== See also ==
- List of black college football classics
- Ocean of Soul
