= Arthur Cox (American football) =

American football player (1961–2020)

No. 88, 83
- Position: Tight end

Personal information
- Born: February 5, 1961; Plant City, Florida, U.S.
- Died: July 10, 2020 (aged 59); Plant City, Florida, U.S.
- Listed height: 6 ft 2 in (1.88 m)
- Listed weight: 277 lb (126 kg)

Career information
- High school: Plant City (Plant City, Florida)
- College: Texas Southern
- NFL draft: 1983: undrafted

Career history
- Atlanta Falcons (1983–1987); San Diego Chargers (1988–1991); Miami Dolphins (1991); Cleveland Browns (1991)

Career NFL statistics
- Receptions: 170
- Receiving yards: 1,758
- Touchdowns: 10
- Stats at Pro Football Reference

Arthur Dean Cox (February 5, 1961 – July 10, 2020) was an American professional football tight end in the National Football League.

Playing college football at Texas Southern University, he went undrafted, and signed with the Atlanta Falcons before the 1983 season. He eventually became the Falcons' full-time starting tight end and had his most productive seasons in 1984 and 1985 (where he had a career high 454 receiving yards).

Cox's productivity decreased in the following two seasons, and following the 1987 season, the Falcons chose not to resign him. Before the 1988 season, he signed with the San Diego Chargers, who later hired his old Falcons head coach Dan Henning. There, Cox immediately became a starter and maintained his reputation as a tough player and as a respected run-blocking tight end.

In 1991, he lost his starter role, and was limited to playing in formations utilizing three tight ends. With the imminent reactivation of rookie tight end Duane Young from the injured reserve list, the Chargers released Cox on October 29. Cox subsequently was signed by the Miami Dolphins, but was waived on November 18, following two weeks of playing on special teams and goal line formations. He was quickly signed by the Cleveland Browns, for whom he played his last three NFL games.

Cox had two children (Artesha and Ebonee). Cox grew up in Plant City, Florida, as one of 10 children. His father died when Cox was young. He died while suffering from kidney troubles.
