= Oliver Celestin =

American football player (born 1981)

No. 45, 40, 35
- Position: Safety

Personal information
- Born: February 25, 1981 (age 45); New Orleans, Louisiana, U.S.
- Listed height: 6 ft 0 in (1.83 m)
- Listed weight: 207 lb (94 kg)

Career information
- High school: St. Augustine (New Orleans)
- College: Texas Southern
- NFL draft: 2003: undrafted

Career history
- Cleveland Browns (2003)*; Berlin Thunder (2004); Minnesota Vikings (2004)*; New York Jets (2004–2005); Seattle Seahawks (2006); Arizona Cardinals (2007–2008); Kansas City Chiefs (2008); New York Sentinels (2009)
- * Offseason or practice squad member only

Career NFL statistics
- Games played: 58
- Total tackles: 77
- Forced fumbles: 1
- Fumble recoveries: 2
- Pass deflections: 3
- Stats at Pro Football Reference

Oliver Celestin Jr. (born February 25, 1981) is an American former professional football player who was a safety in the National Football League (NFL). He played college football for the Texas Southern Tigers and was signed by the New York Jets as an undrafted free agent in 2004.
