= Ocean of Soul =

Marching band of Texas Southern University

The Ocean of Soul Marching Band
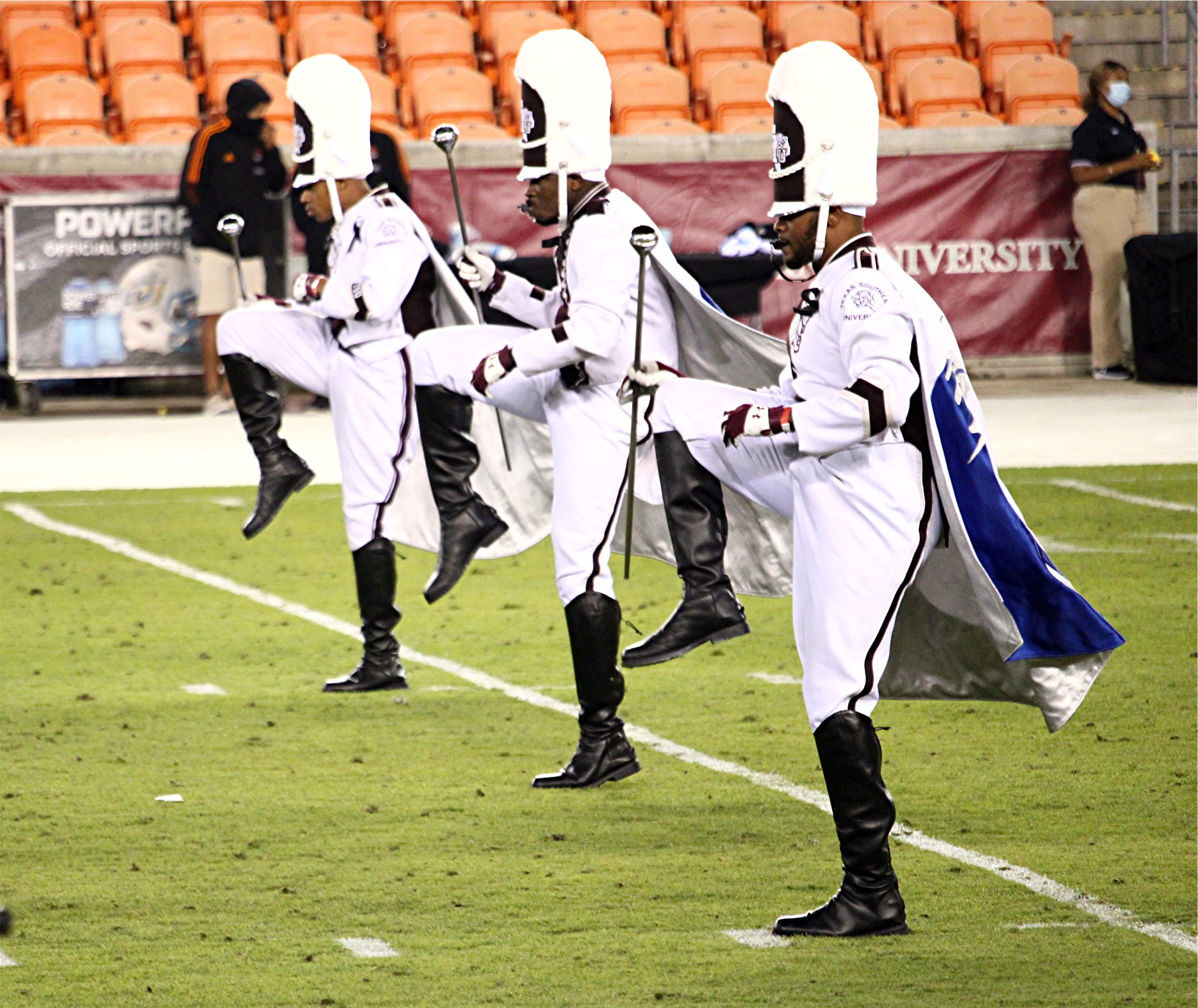
- TSU Ocean of Soul Drum Majors
- Nickname: The Ocean
- School: Texas Southern University
- Location: Houston, Texas
- Conference: SWAC
- Founded: July 1, 1969
- Director: Brian K. Simmons
- Members: 200+
- Website: Ocean of Soul official website

The Ocean of Soul is the marching band representing Texas Southern University. Since June 2021, the band has been under the direction of Brian K. Simmons.

== History ==
The marching band at Texas Southern University (TSU) was founded on July 1st, 1969 by Benjamin J. Butler II. Under the direction of Brian K. Simmons, the Ocean of Soul performs at all university home football, SWAC home basketball games, various parades and university sponsored events, on national television, and before crowds at professional athletic games. The Ocean gained a reputation for its soulful sound, heavy beat, precision drills, and intricate dance routines. The Ocean Of Soul was presented with a proclamation from late Houston Mayor Sylvester Turner on Oct 23, 2022 honoring the legacy of the band by declaring July 1st Ocean Of Soul Day, in Houston.

=== Notable performances ===
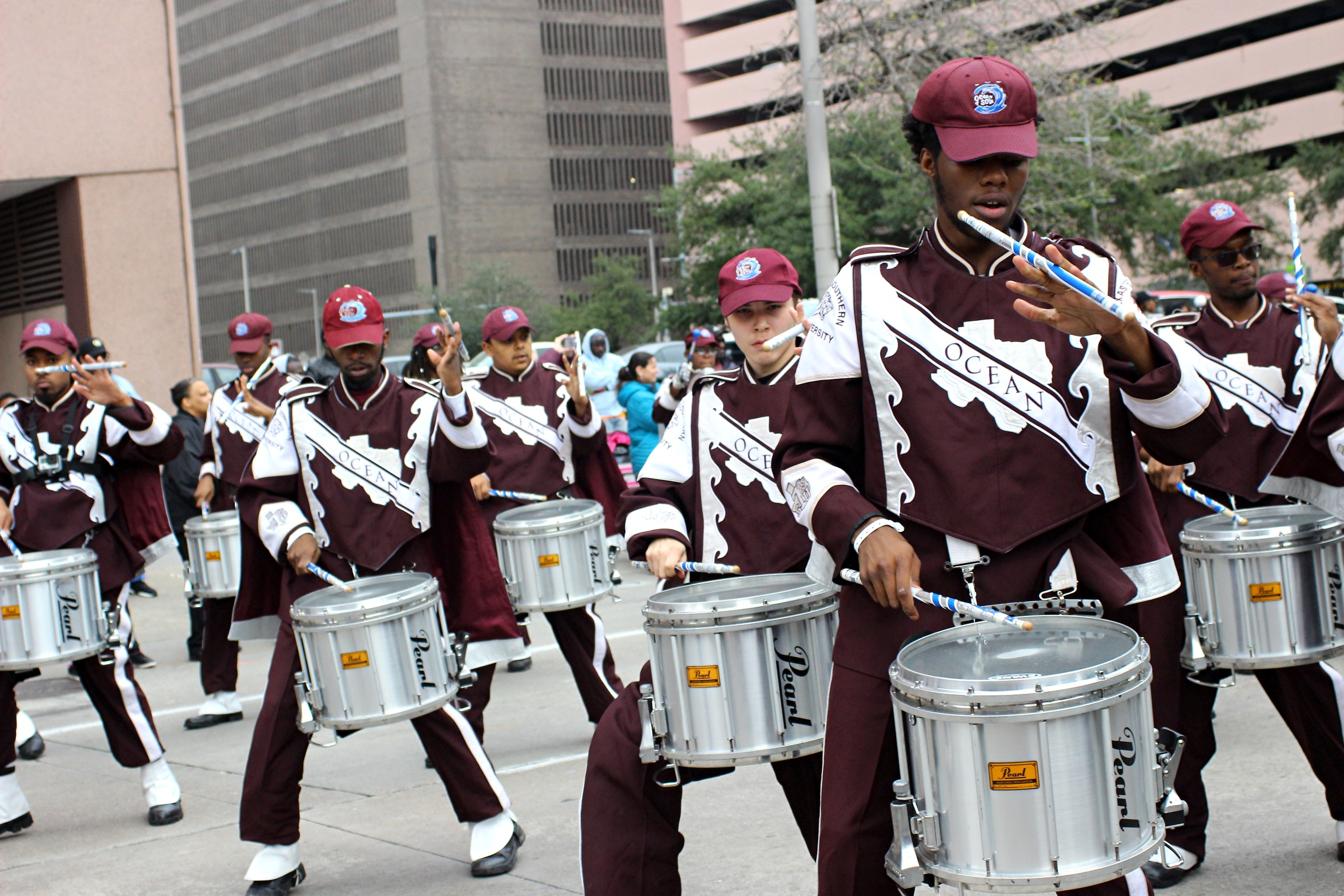
The "Funk Train" drumline at the 2019 MLK parade in downtown Houston

Besides TSU's televised football and select home basketball games, The Ocean has been featured in other events.

The band has been invited to perform at many professional sports games by teams such as the Houston Oilers, Houston Texans, Houston Rockets, San Antonio Spurs, and Dallas Mavericks.

In 2004, the Ocean of Soul was featured in the controversial Super Bowl XXXVIII's halftime show along with the Spirit of Houston in which the infamous wardrobe malfunction involving Janet Jackson and Justin Timberlake.

In 2005, The Ocean performed on the Stellar Awards with Kirk Franklin.

In 2008, The Ocean performed at their first Honda Battle of the Bands in the Georgia Dome. The Ocean was the only band to receive a standing ovation after performing that year.

In 2012, The Ocean of Soul's drumline, "The Funk Train", became the first black collegiate showstyle drumline in history to compete in the Percussive Arts Society International Convention (PASIC)'s Marching Festival. The drumline placed 3rd and gained an award for "Best Cymbal Line".

In 2014, The Ocean of Soul performed at the premiere of The Wedding Ringer in Houston. Co-star Kevin Hart accepted his invitation to become an honorary lifetime "Ocean" member at the event and donated $50,000 to the band.

Also in 2014, The Ocean of Soul performed at TSU alumnus Michael Strahan's Pro Football Hall of Fame induction ceremony in Canton, Ohio. Strahan donated $100,000 to the band for their outstanding support.

In 2016, The Ocean Of Soul performed the opening sequence for Fox Sports NFL Sunday in Houston, live on national television from Discovery Green.

In 2017, several members of The Ocean of Soul performed live with Solange for her performance of her hit single "Don't Touch My Hair" on campus. The band was also invited to lead the celebration parade for the Houston Astros 2017 World Series Championship through downtown Houston that had 750,000 in attendance.

In 2019, members of The Ocean of Soul drumline opened up for Megan Thee Stallion for her sold out show at the White Oak Music Hall.

In 2022, the Ocean of Soul was invited to WrestleMania 38 in Dallas to open up for Bianca Belair’s entrance.

On Christmas 2024, the Ocean of Soul performed with Houston native Beyonce at halftime of the Baltimore Ravens vs. Houston Texans game in NRG Stadium. This performance was nominated and won an Emmy Award for Outstanding Costumes for a Variety, Nonfiction or Reality Program at the 77th Creative Arts In 2025, Beyonce's BeyGood foundation donated $100,000 to the band. The donation will fund scholarships, recruitment, retention and technological enhancements for the band.

== Structure ==
With more than 200 members, The Ocean is the largest student organization on campus and a centerpiece of school pride for the university. The Ocean is led by three drum majors and is based in the Rollins-Stewart Music building on campus.

=== Sections ===
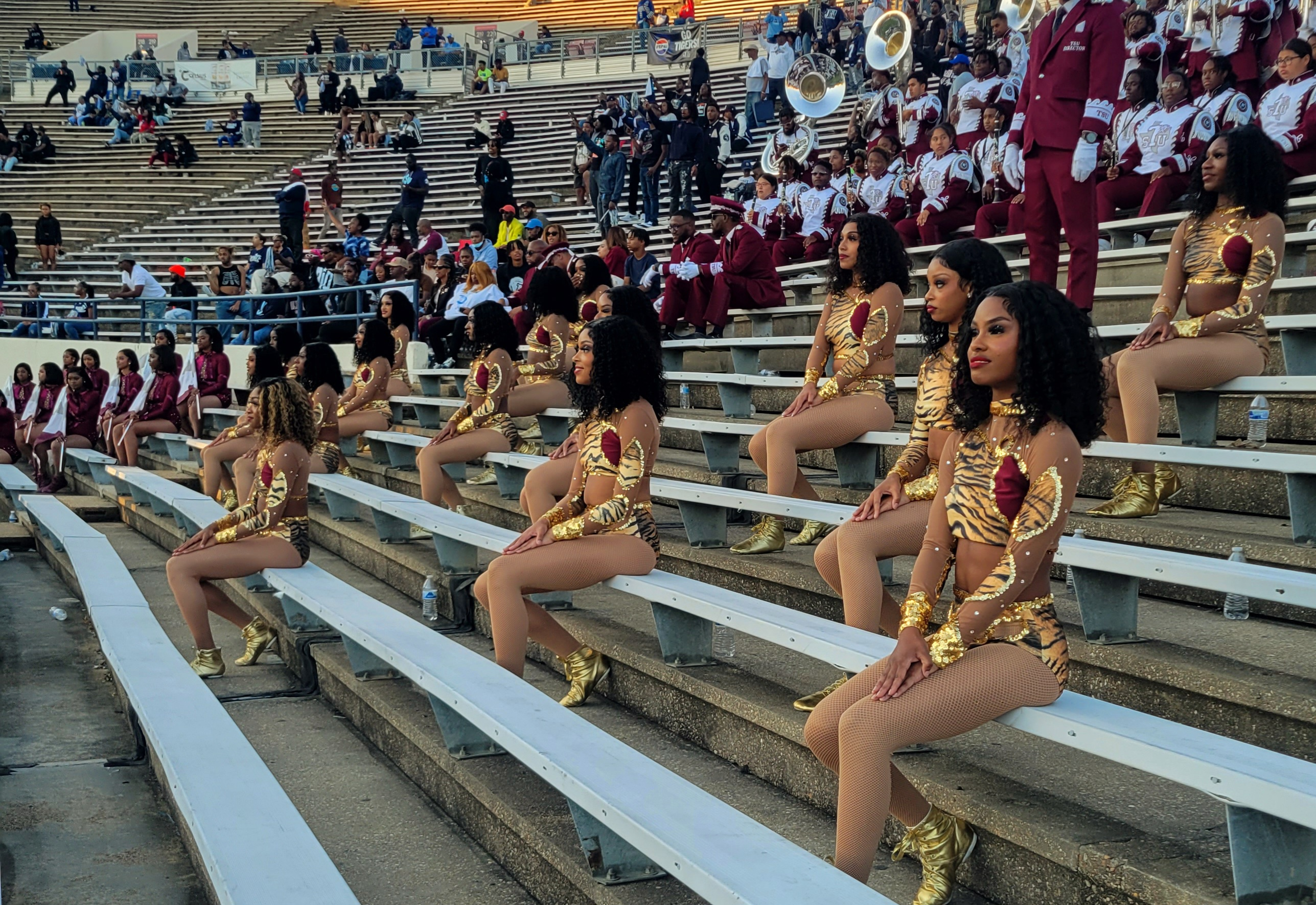
Motion of The Ocean in 2023

The percussion section, known as The Funk Train drumline, is the largest and most highly visible section of Ocean of Soul, followed by trumpets and trombones. The band also includes piccolos, clarinets, a full and powerful euphonium section, better known as Baditude, saxophones, mellophones, and a high-powered sousaphone section, known as Platinum Funk.

The band is also noted for its talented dancers, the self-proclaimed "Class Act of The SWAC", better known as the Motion of The Ocean (also shortened to Motion). Motion was established in 1969 and is under the direction of Danielle Stamper. Members of the Motion dance team received national publicity when they won a bid to compete on Season 5 of MTV's America's Best Dance Crew.

The flashy color guard (The Ocean Waves) and baton twirlers (The Platinum Girls) comprise related sections.

=== Leadership camp ===
Each summer, high school students attend the Band Leadership Camp, an intensive introduction to choreographed dance routines and flag drills, training in corps and show style marching techniques, music theory and leadership skills.

== Legacy ==
Many former members of Ocean of Soul have achieved success in the music industry including

- Grammy award-winning jazz saxophonist Kirk Whalum.
- Platinum Producer June James. (Key to the Streets by YFN Lucci)
- DJ Hollygrove, Grammy Winning nationally syndicated radio and mixtape DJ, current DJ on Core DJ Radio show on Shade 45 as well as Litt Live and iHeart, formerly KQBT on-air personality.
- Clifton “Spug” Smith, a Tuba player for Grammy winning brass band Rebirth Brass Band
- Earl Weaver- Grammy winning tuba player for PJ Morton
- Actress Dominque Perry of Insecure and Rap Shit on HBO
- Kamau Marshall, the Director of Strategic Communications for Joe Biden Joe Biden 2020 presidential campaign

Also a noticeable number of high school band directors are alumni of TSU’s marching band.

== See also ==
- Honda Battle of the Bands
