= YFN Lucci discography =

Hip hop recording artist discography

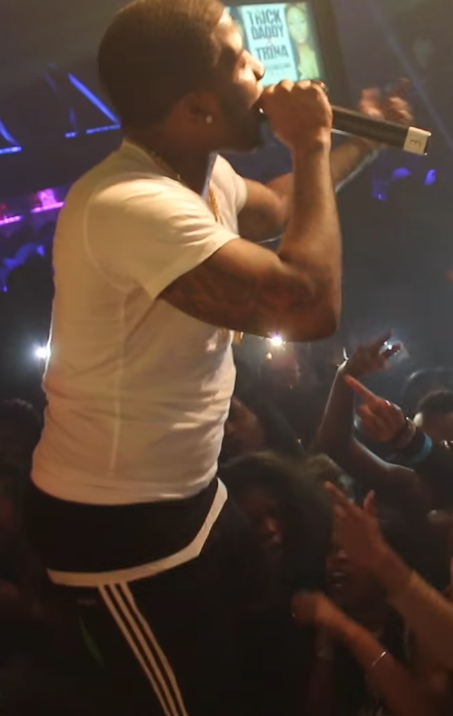
- Lucci performing in 2016
- Studio albums: 3
- EPs: 6
- Singles: 22
- Mixtapes: 7

The discography of American rapper YFN Lucci consists of three studio albums, seven mixtapes, six extended plays and twenty two singles (including twelve as a featured artist).

== Albums ==
=== Studio albums ===
List of studio albums with selected details
Title	Details	Peak chart positions		
Title	Details	US	US R&B/HH	US Rap
Ray Ray from Summerhill	Released: March 9, 2018; Label: Think It's a Game Entertainment; Format: Digital download	14	6	6
Already Legend	Released: September 26, 2025; Label: Already Legend, Think It's a Game; Format: Digital download, streaming	14	5	3
Everything I Said I Am / Everything She Said She Is	Released: November 20, 2026; Label: Already Legend, Think It's a Game, 10K; Format: Digital download, streaming	—	—	—

=== Mixtapes ===
List of mixtapes, with selected chart positions
Title	Details	Peak chart positions			Certifications
Title	Details	US	US R&B/HH	US Rap	Certifications
Wish Me Well	Released: December 16, 2014; Label: Think It's a Game Entertainment; Format: Digital download	—	—	—	
Wish Me Well 2	Released: February 16, 2016; Label: Think It's a Game Entertainment; Format: Digital download	183	28	17	RIAA: Gold
LucciVandross (with Yung Bleu)	Released: July 9, 2018; Label: Think It's a Game Entertainment; Format: Digital download, streaming	—	—	—	
650Luc: Gangsta Grillz (with DJ Drama)	Released: June 21, 2019; Label: Think It's a Game Entertainment; Format: Digital download, streaming	34	18	16	
HIStory	Released: December 12, 2019; Label: Think It's a Game Entertainment, Warner; Format: Digital download, streaming	152	—	—	
HIStory, Lost Pages	Released: February 28, 2020; Label: Think It's a Game Entertainment; Format: Digital download, streaming	—	—	—	
Wish Me Well 3	Released: December 4, 2020; Label: Think It's a Game Entertainment, Warner; Format: Digital download, streaming	49	18	15	
"—" denotes a recording that did not chart.

== EPs ==
List of extended plays with selected details
Title	Details	Peak chart positions		
Title	Details	US	US R&B/HH	US Rap
Long Live Nut	Released: April 3, 2017; Label: Think It's a Game Entertainment; Format: Digital download	27	16	12
Freda's Son	Released: February 16, 2018; Label: Think It's a Game Entertainment; Format: Digital download	149	—	—
See No Evil	Released: April 28, 2018; Label: Think It's a Game Entertainment; Format: Digital download	—	—	—
3 EP	Released: November 9, 2018; Label: Think It's a Game Entertainment; Format: Digital download	—	—	—
3: The Sequel EP	Released: December 14, 2018; Label: Think It's a Game Entertainment; Format: Digital download	—	—	—
Corona Pack EP	Released: April 16, 2020; Label: Think It's a Game Entertainment; Format: Digital download	—	—	—
"—" denotes a recording that did not chart.

== Singles ==
=== As lead artist ===
List of singles as lead artist, with selected chart positions, showing year released and album name
Title	Year	Peak chart positions						Certifications	Album
Title	Year	US	US R&B/HH	US Rap	US Main. R&B/HH	US R&B/HH Air.	US Rap Air.	Certifications	Album
"Made for It" (featuring Backpack)	2014	—	—	—	—	—	—		Wish Me Well
"I Wonder Why" (featuring Skooly)	2014	—	—	—	—	—	—		Wish Me Well
"Know No Better"	2015	—	—	—	—	—	—		Wish Me Well
"YFN"	2015	—	—	—	—	—	—		Wish Me Well 2
"Don't Know Where I'd Be" (with Rich Homie Quan)	2015	—	—	—	—	—	—		Wish Me Well 2
"Key to the Streets" (featuring Migos and Trouble)	2016	70	27	18	4	11	8	RIAA: Platinum	Wish Me Well 2
"Everyday We Lit" (featuring PnB Rock)	2016	33	12	8	5	6	5	MC: Gold; RIAA: 2× Platinum	Long Live Nut
"Never Worried"	2017	—	—	—	—	—	—		Long Live Nut
"Ammunition" (featuring YFN Trae Pound)	2017	—	—	—	—	—	—		Long Live Nut
"Gang Gang" (with Lil Durk)	2017	—	—	—	—	—	—		Non-album single
"50 Missed Calls" (with Ray Vicks and Moneybagg Yo)	2017	—	—	—	—	—	—		Still Trapped in the Hustle
"Boss Life" (featuring Offset)	2017	—	—	—	—	—	—		Ray Ray from Summerhill
"Street Kings" (featuring Meek Mill)	2018	—	—	—	—	—	—		Ray Ray from Summerhill
"One Day" (with Neek Bucks)	2018	—	—	—	—	—	—		Non-album singles
"Live That Life" (with Rich Homie Quan featuring Garren)	2018	—	—	—	—	—	—		Non-album singles
"All Night Long" (featuring Trey Songz)	2019	—	—	—	10	14	15		650Luc: Gangsta Grillz
"Wet"	2020	92	33	—	21	33	—	RIAA: Platinum	Wish Me Well 3
"Fuck It" (featuring Jackboy)	2020	—	—	—	—	—	—		HIStory and Wish Me Well 3
"Man Down"	2020	—	—	—	—	—	—		Wish Me Well 3
"September 7th"	2020	—	—	—	—	—	—		Wish Me Well 3
"I Gotcha"	2021	—	—	—	—	—	—		Non-album single
"Jan. 31st (My Truth)"	2025	— (Note: "Jan. 31st (My Truth)" did not enter the Billboard Hot 100, but peaked at number 4 on the Bubbling Under Hot 100 chart.)	18	11	—	—	—		Already Legend
"Pieces on My Neck" (with 21 Savage)	2025	—	42	—	—	—	—		Already Legend
"Custom Made" (with Tink)	2026	—	45	—	—	—	—		Non-album single
"—" denotes a recording that did not chart.

=== As featured artist ===
List of singles as a featured artist, showing year released and album name
Title	Year	Certification	Album
"Did Dat" (S.K.J featuring YFN Lucci)	2015		Non-album single
"Run It Up" (Jose Guapo featuring Takeoff and YFN Lucci)	2015		Views from the 3
"Understand Me" (Bossaleana featuring YFN Lucci)	2015		Y.O.L.O.
"Everyday" (Ralo featuring YFN Lucci)	2015		Diary of the Streets
"Room Full of Bitchez" (BirdGang Greedy featuring Rich Homie Quan and YFN Lucci)	2015		Non-album singles
"Go Get It" (Mojoceosys featuring YFN Lucci and YFN Kay)	2016		Non-album singles
"Whatever" (BowlLane Slick featuring YFN Lucci)	2016		Truly Blessed
"Work for It" (Kayla Brianna featuring YFN Lucci)	2016		Girl Talk
"Bandz" (Jim Fetti featuring YFN Lucci)	2016		Finesse
"On My Grind" (Dirty1000 featuring YFN Lucci)	2017		Non-album singles
"Lifestyle" (KD Young Cocky featuring YFN Lucci)	2017		Non-album singles
"Muñequita Linda" (Juan Magán, Deorro and MAKJ, featuring YFN Lucci)	2018	RIAA: Gold (Latin)	Non-album singles

== Other charted or certified songs ==
Song, with selected chart positions, showing year released and album name
Title	Year	Peak chart positions				Certifications	Album
Title	Year	US Bub.	US R&B/HH Bub.	US Main. R&B/HH	US R&B/HH Air.	Certifications	Album
"Missing You"	2015	—	—	—	—	RIAA: Gold	Wish Me Well
"Documentary" (featuring Bigga Rankin)	2016	—	—	—	—	RIAA: Gold	Wish Me Well 2
"They Like" (Yo Gotti featuring YFN Lucci)	2016	—	—	35	—	RIAA: Gold	White Friday (CM9)
"You Know" (Meek Mill featuring YFN Lucci)	2016	9	3	—	—		DC4
"There She Go" (PnB Rock featuring YFN Lucci)	2017	—	—	—	—	RIAA: Gold	GTTM: Goin Thru the Motions
"Heartless" (featuring Rick Ross and Bigga Rankin)	2017	—	—	36	—	RIAA: Gold	Long Live Nut
"7.62"	2019	—	—	—	—	RIAA: Gold	HIStory
"Both of Us" (featuring Rick Ross and Layton Greene)	2020	—	—	34	45		Wish Me Well 3
"—" denotes a recording that did not chart.

== Guest appearances ==
List of non-single guest appearances, with other performing artists, showing year released and album name
Title	Year	Other performer(s)	Album
"All About You"	2015	Johnny Cinco	—N/a
"Do Better"	2015	Johnny Cinco	I Swear
"They Hate"	2015	Johnny Cinco, YFN Kay	—N/a
"The Ghetto"	2015	Johnny Cinco	Trap Religious
"Fly Niggas"	2015	Johnny Cinco	—N/a
"Gotta Stop"	2016	Johnny Cinco	Cinco 2
"Talk"	2016	Johnny Cinco, YFN TrePound	Cinco 2
"Power"	2016	Kap G	El Southside
"Make It Out"	2016	HotRod SKM	Brothers In Arms
"No Mind"	2016	TK Kravitz	TK Kravitz
"You in Love with Her"	2016	2 Chainz	Daniel Son; Necklace Don
"Hustle for Mine"	2016	Blac Youngsta	Fuck Everybody
"La Familia"	2016	HotRod SKM	Brothers In Arms
"You Know"	2016	Meek Mill	DC4
"Rich Forever"	2016	Lil Durk	They Forgot
"Want More"	2016	Greedy, Johnny Cinco	—N/a
"Play by the Rules"	2016	Omelly	On My Time Vol 2
"They Like"	2016	Yo Gotti	White Friday (CM9)
"Watch Out"	2017	Lil Durk, Johnny Cinco, Hypno Carlito, YFN Traepound	—N/a
"Confuse Me"	2017	Blac Youngsta	Illuminati
"One on One"	2017	Yo Gotti, Meek Mill	I Still Am
"Hustlin"	2017	Young Scooter, Meek Mill	Jugg King
"Young N*gga Dreams"	2017	Meek Mill, Barcelini	Meekend Music 2
"The Dopeman" (Intro)	2017	Ralo	Famarican Gangster 2
"Pray For Me"	2018	T.I.	Dime Trap
"Dream Last Night"	2018	Ralo	Diary Of The Streets 3
"Safe Mode (Remix)"	2018	24Heavy, 21 Savage	—N/a
"Bosses Make Sure"	2018	Ralo	Conspiracy
"Walk With a Limp"	2018	Mozzy	Gangland Landlord
"Dirty Diana"	2018	Lil Durk	Only the Family: Vol. 1
"Gotta Play the Game"	2018	Jim Jones	Wasted Talent
"I Remember"	2018	Tee Grizzley	Activated
"Remember"	2018	Mozzy, E Mozzy	Spiritual Conversations
"Christmas List"	2018	Boosie Badazz, Rich Homie Quan	Savage Holidays
"Bae Dreamin"	2019	Fabolous	Summertime Shootout 3: Coldest Summer Ever
"Real S--t"	2019	J Stone, Mozzy	The Definition of Loyalty
"Tripp Today"	2019	Q Money	How You Gon Hate
"I Still Pray"	2019	Rick Ross, Ball Greezy	Port of Miami 2
"Broken Promises"	2019	JayDaYoungan	Misunderstood
"FWM"	2020	EST Gee	I Still Don't Feel Nun
"Get Even"	2020	Mozzy	Occupational Hazard
"Lit"	2021	MO3	Shottaz 4Eva
"Deserve It"	2021	Yungeen Ace	Life of Betrayal 2x
"Let You Know"	2021	Mozzy	Untreated Trauma
"We Active"	2023	Mozzy	Kollect Kall
