= June James (music producer) =

American record producer

June "The Genius" James
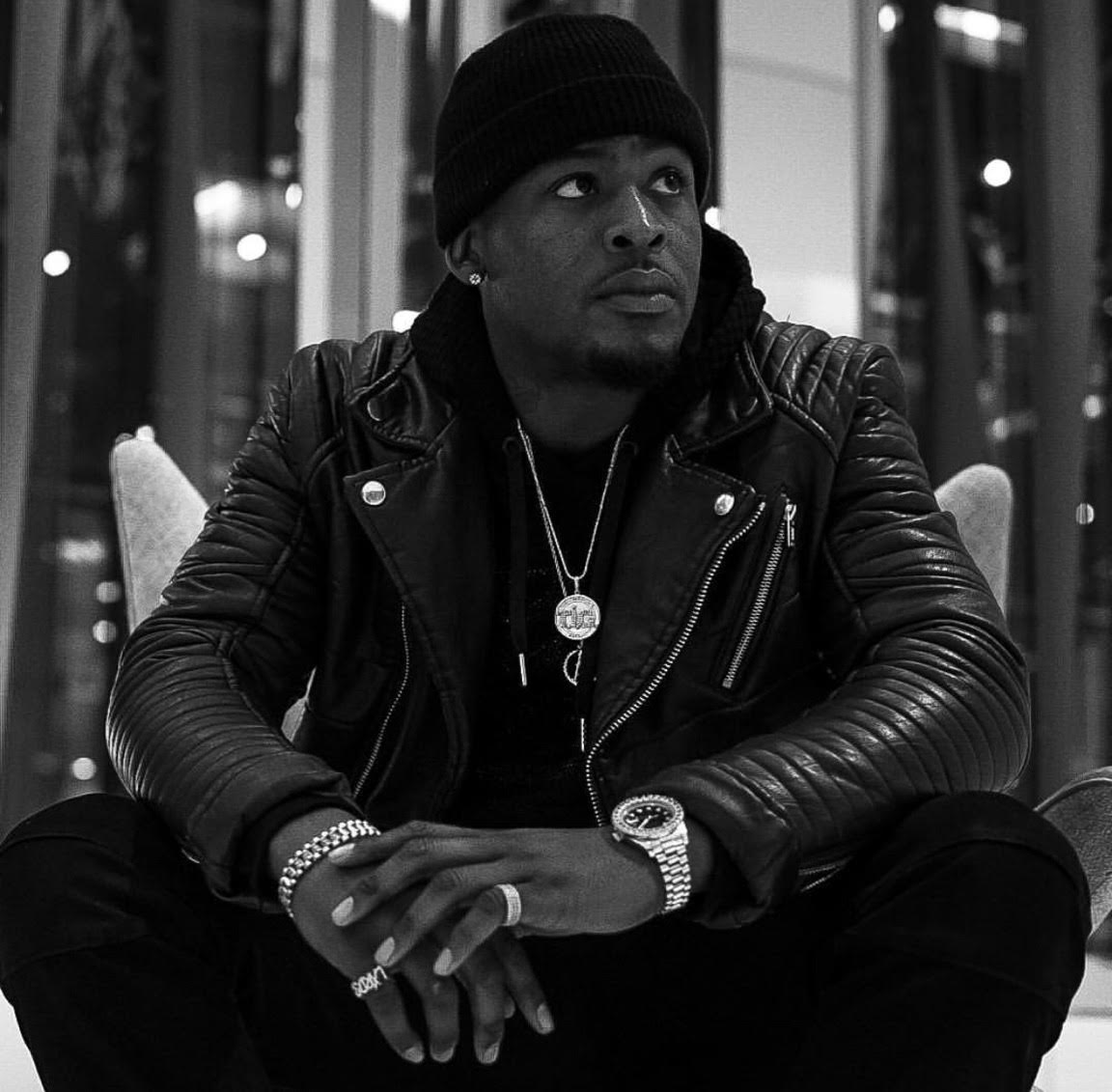

Background information
- Also known as: June "The Genius"
- Born: June James; October 11, 1990 (age 36); Houston, Texas, U.S.
- Genre: Hip hop
- Occupations: Record producer, songwriter
- Years active: 2013–present
- Labels: Think It's A Game (T.I.G.) Entertainment, Warner Bros.
- Website: www.thinkitsagame.com

June James (born October 11, 1990), also known as June, the Genius, is an American record producer from Houston, Texas. In 2016, he signed with Think It's A Game Entertainment and produced YFN Lucci's second mixtape Wish Me Well 2, which included the hit single "Key to the Streets". James then produced Lucci's 2018 single "Everyday We Lit", which peaked at number 33 on the Billboard Hot 100. He is also a former member of Texas Southern University Ocean of Soul marching band.

== Early life ==
June James was born on October 11, 1990, in Houston, Texas where he grew up. James studied at Texas Southern University where he was a member of the Ocean of Soul alongside The Chopstars DJ Hollygrove. While a member he met other artists and DJs which led him to curate LAD DJ's – a coalition started in 2011 that grew to about 40 members. He also founded the music group, The Hit Cartel in 2014 which includes producers, engineers, songwriters, disc jockeys, and artists.

Since then, June has produced for multiple artists, including T.I., Gucci Mane, and Young Dolph. He was awarded “Producer of the Year” at Houston's Hottest Awards in 2014 and was awarded his second “Producer of the Year” award at the 2015 Go DJ Awards. In February 2016, he produced tracks on Lucci's Wish Me Well 2 mixtape, which peaked at number 183 on the US Billboard 200 chart. The mixtape's hit single "Key to the Streets" featuring Migos and Trouble, peaked at number 70 on the US Billboard Hot 100 chart. The official remix version of the song featured 2 Chainz, Lil Wayne and Quavo. "Key to the Streets" was included on XXL magazine's 50 Best Hip-Hop Songs of 2016 list and Vibe magazine's The 60 Best Songs Of 2016 list.

== Career ==
In December 2016, June signed an exclusive songwriter and co-publishing agreement with Think It's A Game Entertainment and continued his success with the company after James’ “Key To The Streets” went to No. 1 on Urban Radio on November 14. James also produced the song's remix featuring guest artists 2 Chainz, Lil Wayne and Quavo, as well as the Genius Mix from “The Key To The Streets Keychain Remix Pack”.

He worked with YFN Lucci on his debut hit "Everyday We Lit" featuring PnB Rock.

James also produced the track "Yosemite" on Travis Scott's album Astroworld that debuted at number one on Billboard 200 Chart With Second-Largest Debut of 2018. The track features vocals from Gunna and Nav.

James also worked on the track "Underdog" with American rappers Lil Baby and Gunna on their mixtape "Drip Harder".

In 2019, James worked with rapper Drake on his track titled "When To Say When" featuring samples of JAY Z "Song Cry" that appeared on the OVO leader's YouTube channel as an official video.

== Production ==
EPs

- Long Live Nut (2017)
- Freda's Son (2018)

Mixtapes

- Wish Me Well (2014)
- Wish Me Well 2 (2016)

Singles

- Key to the Streets YFN Lucci (2016)
- Everyday We Lit YFN Lucci & PnB Rock (2017)
- Chosen One YoungBoy Never Broke Again (2017)
- Shawty Wassup Yung Nation (2017)
- Never Worried YFN Lucci (2017)
- Aqquital MoneyBagg Yo & YoungBoy Never Broke Again (2017)
- OK Bitch 2 Chainz (2018)
- Nicki Minaj YoungBoy Never Broke Again (2018)
- Chosen One YoungBoy Never Broke Again & Kodak Black (2018)
- Yosemite Travis Scott (2018)
- Everyday We Sick Lil Wayne (2018)
- Put a Date on It Yo Gotti & Lil Baby(2019)
- Out Tha Mud Roddy Ricch (2019)
- Virgil Discount 2 Chainz T.R.U. & Skooly (2020)
- When To Say When Drake (2020)
