= Cougar Fight Song =

Cougar Fight Song may refer to:

- Cougar Fight Song (University of Houston), the fight song of the University of Houston
- The Cougar Song (BYU), the fight song of Brigham Young University
