= Boss Life (disambiguation) =

Boss Life is a 2013 album by Slim Thug, or its title track.

Boss Life may also refer to:

- "Boss Life", a 2009 song by Timati from the album The Boss
- "Boss Life", a 2017 song by Dame D.O.L.L.A. from the album Confirmed
- "Boss Life", a 2017 song by YFN Lucci

== See also ==
- "Boss' Life", a song by Snoop Dogg from the 2006 album Tha Blue Carpet Treatment
  - "Boss' Life", a 2011 song by Domo Genesis from the mixtape Under the Influence; a cover of the Snoop Dogg song
- Thug life (disambiguation)
