= Fight! Fight! Fight! =

Fight! Fight! Fight! could refer to:

- "Fight! Fight! Fight!", a phrase shouted during the attempted assassination of Donald Trump in Pennsylvania
- A lyric in the song "Texas Fight"
- A lyric in the song "Cougar Fight Song"
