= Super Bowl XXXVIII =

2004 National Football League Championship

Carolina Panthers (3) (NFC) (11–5)	New England Patriots (1) (AFC) (14–2)
29	32
Head coach: John Fox	Head coach: Bill Belichick
	1	2	3	4	Total
CAR	0	10	0	19	29
NE	0	14	0	18	32
- Date: February 1, 2004
- Stadium: Reliant Stadium; Houston, Texas
- MVP: Tom Brady, quarterback
- Favorite: Patriots by 7
- Referee: Ed Hochuli
- Attendance: 71,525

Ceremonies
- National anthem: Beyoncé
- Coin toss: Earl Campbell, Ollie Matson, Don Maynard, Y. A. Tittle, Mike Singletary, Gene Upshaw
- Halftime show: Jessica Simpson, Ocean of Soul, Spirit of Houston, Janet Jackson, Justin Timberlake, P. Diddy, Kid Rock, and Nelly

TV in the United States
- Network: CBS
- Announcers: Greg Gumbel, Phil Simms, Armen Keteyian and Bonnie Bernstein
- Nielsen ratings: 41.4 (est. 89.8 million viewers)
- Market share: 63
- Cost of 30-second commercial: $2.2 million

Radio in the United States
- Network: Westwood One
- Announcers: Marv Albert, Boomer Esiason, John Dockery, and John Riggins

Super Bowl XXXVIII was an American football game between the National Football Conference (NFC) champion Carolina Panthers and the American Football Conference (AFC) champion New England Patriots to decide the National Football League (NFL) champion for the 2003 season. The Patriots defeated the Panthers by a score of 32–29. The game was played at Reliant Stadium in Houston, Texas, on February 1, 2004. At the time, this was the most watched Super Bowl ever with 89.8 million viewers.

The Panthers were making their first ever Super Bowl appearance after posting an 11–5 regular season record. They also made it the second straight year that a team from the NFC South division made the Super Bowl, with the Tampa Bay Buccaneers winning Super Bowl XXXVII. The Patriots, led by head coach Bill Belichick and quarterback Tom Brady, were seeking their second Super Bowl title in three years after posting a 14–2 record.

NFL fans and sports writers widely consider this game one of the most well-played and thrilling Super Bowls; following the game Sports Illustrated writer Peter King hailed it as the "Greatest Super Bowl of all time." Although neither team could score in the first and third quarters, making it the first ever Super Bowl with two scoreless quarters, they ended up with a combined total of 868 yards and 61 points. The game was scoreless for a Super Bowl record 26:55 before the two teams combined for 24 points prior to halftime. The clubs then combined for a Super Bowl record 37 points in the fourth quarter. The contest was finally decided when the Patriots kicker Adam Vinatieri's 41-yard field goal was made with four seconds left. Patriots quarterback Tom Brady was named Super Bowl MVP for the second time in his career.

The game is also known for its controversial halftime show in which Janet Jackson's breast, adorned with a nipple shield, was exposed by Justin Timberlake for about half a second, in what was later referred to as a "wardrobe malfunction". Along with the rest of the halftime show, it led to an immediate crackdown by the Federal Communications Commission (FCC), and widespread debate on perceived indecency in broadcasting.

== Background ==
=== Host selection process ===
NFL owners voted to award Super Bowl XXXVIII to Houston during their November 1, 2000, meeting held in Atlanta. It marked the second Super Bowl held in the Houston area, the first was VIII played at Rice Stadium. Three Super Bowls host sites were selected during the meeting, XXXVIII, XXXIX, and XL. However, XXXIX was the only one of the three that involved a competitive voting process. The vote for XXXVIII was mostly a formality, as Houston had been tentatively preselected for the game, contingent on satisfying a series of basic requirements. No other cities were considered for XXXVIII. Back in 1998, NFL commissioner Paul Tagliabue had singled out San Diego (Qualcomm Stadium) as the likely host for XXXVIII. However, San Diego ultimately got XXXVII instead after the league took away that game from San Francisco. After their lone previous effort of hosting the Super Bowl (1974), the city of Houston had bid numerous times, unsuccessfully, to host the game a second time. Both Rice Stadium and later the Astrodome had been proposed, but both were rejected by owners for various reasons. Despite being indoors, the Astrodome lacked capacity, which would require temporary seating. The closest the Astrodome came to winning a bid was for XXIX when it finished a close second in the voting. Houston then lost the Oilers after 1996, and were without an NFL franchise for five seasons.

On October 6, 1999, the NFL owners voted to award the city of Houston the 32nd expansion franchise. The Houston Texans would begin play in 2002, and would play their home games in a brand new facility, Reliant Stadium. In the weeks leading up to the expansion vote, the negotiations included a promise by the NFL that Houston, if they were to win the expansion vote, would receive a Super Bowl 'as soon as possible' at the new stadium. Since future host sites had already been selected through XXXVII (January 2003), the soonest Houston could host would be XXXVIII (February 2004). That satisfied the NFL's rule that required new stadiums to wait until at least their second year of operation before hosting a Super Bowl, in order to iron out any logistical issues or construction delays. About a year after being awarded the expansion franchise, on November 1, 2000, the Houston task force, led by mayor Lee Brown, Texans owner Bob McNair, representatives from the Houston Livestock Show and Rodeo, and other local leaders, delivered their formal presentation. Houston was awarded XXXVIII without opposition. Jacksonville won the vote for XXXIX, and Detroit was awarded XL.

This was the first Super Bowl to be played in a retractable roof stadium. However, it would remain closed during the game. This game marked a six-month stretch for the state of Texas hosting the Super Bowl, the NCAA Final Four (Alamodome) and the MLB All-Star Game (Minute Maid Park). Super Bowl XXXVIII was the first Super Bowl to be scheduled for the first Sunday of February; subsequent Super Bowls through LV would follow this format. XXXVI had previously been held on the first Sunday of February, but that came as a result of the NFL pushing back the 2001 playoffs by a week as a result of the September 11 attacks.

=== Carolina Panthers ===
The Panthers made their first trip to the Super Bowl after posting a one-win regular season just two years earlier. The franchise was in its ninth year of existence, joining the league as an expansion team in 1995.

In 2001, the Panthers suffered a franchise-worst 1–15 record. After that year, head coach George Seifert was relieved of his duties and replaced by John Fox. With Fox at the helm and the team taking advantage of the free agent market and the salary cap rules, the Panthers improved in 2002, finishing with a 7–9 record. Then in 2003, they recorded an 11–5 record to win the NFC South.

One of the free agents that the Panthers signed before the 2003 season was quarterback Jake Delhomme. The Panthers signed him to be the backup to starting quarterback Rodney Peete. However, after the Panthers fell to a 17–0 third quarter deficit in their first game of the season against the Jacksonville Jaguars, gaining only one first down and 36 offensive yards, Fox immediately replaced Peete with Delhomme. Delhomme led the Panthers to a 24–23 comeback victory over the Jaguars.

Delhomme became the team's starting quarterback for the rest of the season, throwing for 3,219 yards and 19 touchdowns, with 16 interceptions. The team's main receiving threat was third-year wide receiver Steve Smith, who also specialized as a kickoff and punt returner. Smith had 1,110 yards and seven touchdowns, rushed for 42 yards, gained 439 yards and another touchdown returning punts. Wide receiver Muhsin Muhammad was also a constant breakaway threat, recording 837 yards and three touchdowns.

However, the Panthers' strength on offense was their running game, led by running backs Stephen Davis and DeShaun Foster. Davis was the team's leading rusher with a franchise record 1,444 yards and eight touchdowns, while Foster rushed for 429 yards and had 207 receiving yards.

On defense, the Panthers' main strength was its defensive line, anchored by defensive ends Julius Peppers (seven sacks and three forced fumbles) and Mike Rucker (12 sacks and an interception), and Pro Bowl defensive tackle Kris Jenkins (five sacks and a fumble recovery). The secondary was led by Reggie Howard (two interceptions), Mike Minter (three interceptions and two touchdowns), Deon Grant (three interceptions), and Ricky Manning Jr. (three interceptions and a touchdown).

=== New England Patriots ===
Despite their victory in Super Bowl XXXVI after the 2001 season, the Patriots stumbled early in 2002, recorded a 9–7 record, and failed to make the playoffs.

Then, the Patriots seemed to implode before the 2003 season ever started. Five days before their opening game against the Buffalo Bills, Pro Bowl safety Lawyer Milloy, one of the Patriots' defensive leaders, was unexpectedly cut by the team after refusing to restructure his contract. The move devastated many of the Patriots players, while Milloy immediately signed with the Bills two days later. With the Patriots seemingly in emotional disarray, the Bills defeated the Patriots, 31–0, with Milloy forcing an interception and recording one sack and five tackles.

However, after a 2–2 start, the Patriots ended up winning their last 12 games to earn a league-best 14–2 record.

Tom Brady, the Super Bowl XXXVI MVP, had become the team's permanent starter in 2002 after quarterback Drew Bledsoe left the team. Brady had a solid season in 2003, completing 317 out of 527 (60.2 percent) of his passes for 3,620 yards and 23 touchdowns, with only 12 interceptions. His primary weapon was second year wide receiver Deion Branch, who had for 803 receiving yards. Another key contributor was wide receiver David Givens, who filled in for the injured starter David Patten. Givens recorded 510 receiving yards and six touchdowns. Other weapons in the passing game included veteran wide receiver Troy Brown, who had 472 receiving yards, four touchdowns, and 293 yards returning punts, and tight end Daniel Graham with 409 receiving yards, and four touchdowns. Rookie receiver Bethel Johnson returned ranked second in the NFL with a 28.2 yards per return average on kickoffs, with a return touchdown, while also having for 209 receiving yards and two touchdowns.

In the backfield, the team's rushing game was led by running backs Antowain Smith and Kevin Faulk, who carried the ball equally. Smith was the team's leading rusher with 642 yards and touchdowns, while Faulk rushed for 638 yards and had 440 receiving yards.

The Patriots' defense was retooled before the 2003 season when the team signed veteran safety Rodney Harrison as a free agent and traded for nose tackle Ted Washington. With these additions, the Patriots led the league in fewest passing yards allowed per attempt (5.64), fewest passing touchdowns allowed (11), and most interceptions (29). They also ranked fourth in fewest rushing yards allowed (1,434) and seventh in fewest total yards (4,919).

Washington helped anchor the Patriots' defensive line, recording 32 tackles and 2 sacks. Pro Bowl defensive end Richard Seymour also contributed with 8 sacks. Behind them, the Patriots had three outstanding linebackers: Pro Bowl linebacker Willie McGinest (5.5 sacks, two fumble recoveries and one interception), Mike Vrabel (9.5 sacks, one fumble recovery, four forced fumbles, and two interceptions), and Tedy Bruschi (131 tackles, 2 sacks, one fumble recovery, three interceptions, and two touchdowns).

Harrison became the veteran leader in the secondary, recording 92 tackles, three interceptions, and 3 sacks. Meanwhile, Pro Bowl cornerback Ty Law recorded six interceptions, cornerback (and ex-Panthers player) Tyrone Poole had six interceptions and a touchdown, while also forcing three fumbles. Rookie safety Eugene Wilson recorded four interceptions. Overall, the secondary combined for 19 interceptions.

=== Playoffs ===
Since the Panthers finished with the third best regular season record in the NFC, they had to win three playoff games to reach the Super Bowl. The St. Louis Rams and the Philadelphia Eagles had better regular season records at 12–4, and thus under the playoff format, each would have to win two playoff games to reach the league championship game. Against the Panthers' first opponent, the Dallas Cowboys, Delhomme threw for 273 yards and a touchdown, Davis recorded 104 rushing yards and a touchdown, and kicker John Kasay made 5 field goals, en route to a thorough 29–10 victory.

The Panthers then eliminated the Rams on the road, 29–23 in double overtime. The Rams built a 6–0 lead early in the second quarter, but the Panthers took the lead after Muhammad's fumble recovery in the end zone. Both teams spent the rest of the second and the third quarter exchanging field goals before Brad Hoover's 7-yard rushing touchdown gave the Panthers a 23–12 fourth quarter lead. However, the Rams rallied back with a touchdown, a successful two-point conversion, and a field goal to send the game into overtime. Both teams missed field goals in the first overtime period, but Delhomme threw a 69-yard touchdown pass to Smith on the first play of the second overtime period to win the game.

The Panthers then went on the road again to eliminate the Eagles in the NFC Championship Game, 14–3. The Eagles were coming off of a 20–17 overtime win over the Green Bay Packers, that included quarterback Donovan McNabb's 28-yard pass to Freddie Mitchell on a famous play known as "4th and 26". This was the third consecutive NFC Championship Game appearance for the Eagles, and thus they were heavily favored to win. But the Panthers' defense only allowed a field goal and held McNabb to just 10 of 22 completions for 100 yards. Ricky Manning also intercepted McNabb 3 times. Although the Panthers' offense only scored 14 points, it was more than enough for the team to earn their first trip to the Super Bowl with a 14–3 win.

The Panthers became the first No. 3 seed to advance to the Super Bowl since the league expanded to a 12-team playoff format in 1990. In doing so, they were also the first division winner to advance to the league championship after playing three playoff games. All other instances up to this point where teams advanced to the Super Bowl after playing all three rounds of the playoffs were wild card teams in Super Bowls XV, XX, XXVII, XXXII, XXXIV, and XXXV. Prior to Super Bowl XVII, the Miami Dolphins and Washington Redskins both won three playoff games to reach the Super Bowl, but that came during the strike-shortened 1982 season when the regular season was reduced to nine games and the playoffs were expanded to 16 teams, with no teams receiving first-round byes. Since then, there have been seven instances of teams advancing to the Super Bowl after playing three playoff games: the Pittsburgh Steelers in Super Bowl XL as the No. 6 seeded team, the Indianapolis Colts in Super Bowl XLI as the No. 3 seed, the New York Giants in Super Bowl XLII as the No. 5 seed, the Arizona Cardinals in Super Bowl XLIII as the No. 4 seed, the Green Bay Packers in Super Bowl XLV as the No. 6 seed, again the New York Giants in Super Bowl XLVI as the No. 4 seed, and the Tampa Bay Buccaneers in Super Bowl LV as the No. 5 seed. The Colts, Cardinals, and the Giants in 2011, like the Panthers, were division winners in those years (although in the Colts' case, they played the No. 4 seeded New England Patriots in the AFC Championship that year, ensuring at least the second division winner to play three rounds to make it to the Super Bowl), and all but the Cardinals went on to win it all. The Super Bowl would mark the third game (out of four) of the playoffs in which the Panthers scored 29 points.

Meanwhile, the Patriots first defeated the Tennessee Titans, 17–14, in one of the coldest games in NFL history, with temperatures reaching 4 °F (−15 °C). The Patriots jumped to 14–7 lead in the first half with a touchdown pass by Brady and a touchdown run from Smith. However, Titans quarterback (and co-NFL MVP; shared with Indianapolis Colts quarterback Peyton Manning) Steve McNair's 11-yard touchdown pass to receiver Derrick Mason tied the game in the third period. With 4:06 remaining in the game, Patriots kicker Adam Vinatieri made a 46-yard field goal to take the lead. The Patriots' defense later clinched a victory as they stopped the Titans from scoring on fourth down on their last drive of the game.

The Patriots then eliminated the Indianapolis Colts, 24–14, in the AFC Championship Game. The Colts entered the game leading the NFL in passing yards and ranked third in total offensive yards. With quarterback Peyton Manning, wide receiver Marvin Harrison, and running back Edgerrin James, the Colts had scored 79 points in their 2 playoff victories against the Denver Broncos and the Kansas City Chiefs, including a 38–31 victory over the Chiefs in the first punt-less game in NFL playoff history. However, the Patriots' defense dominated the Colts, only allowing 14 points, intercepting 4 passes from co-league MVP Manning (3 of them by Ty Law), and forcing a safety. Although the Patriots' offense only scored one touchdown, Vinatieri scored 5 field goals to make up the difference.

== Broadcasting ==
=== United States ===
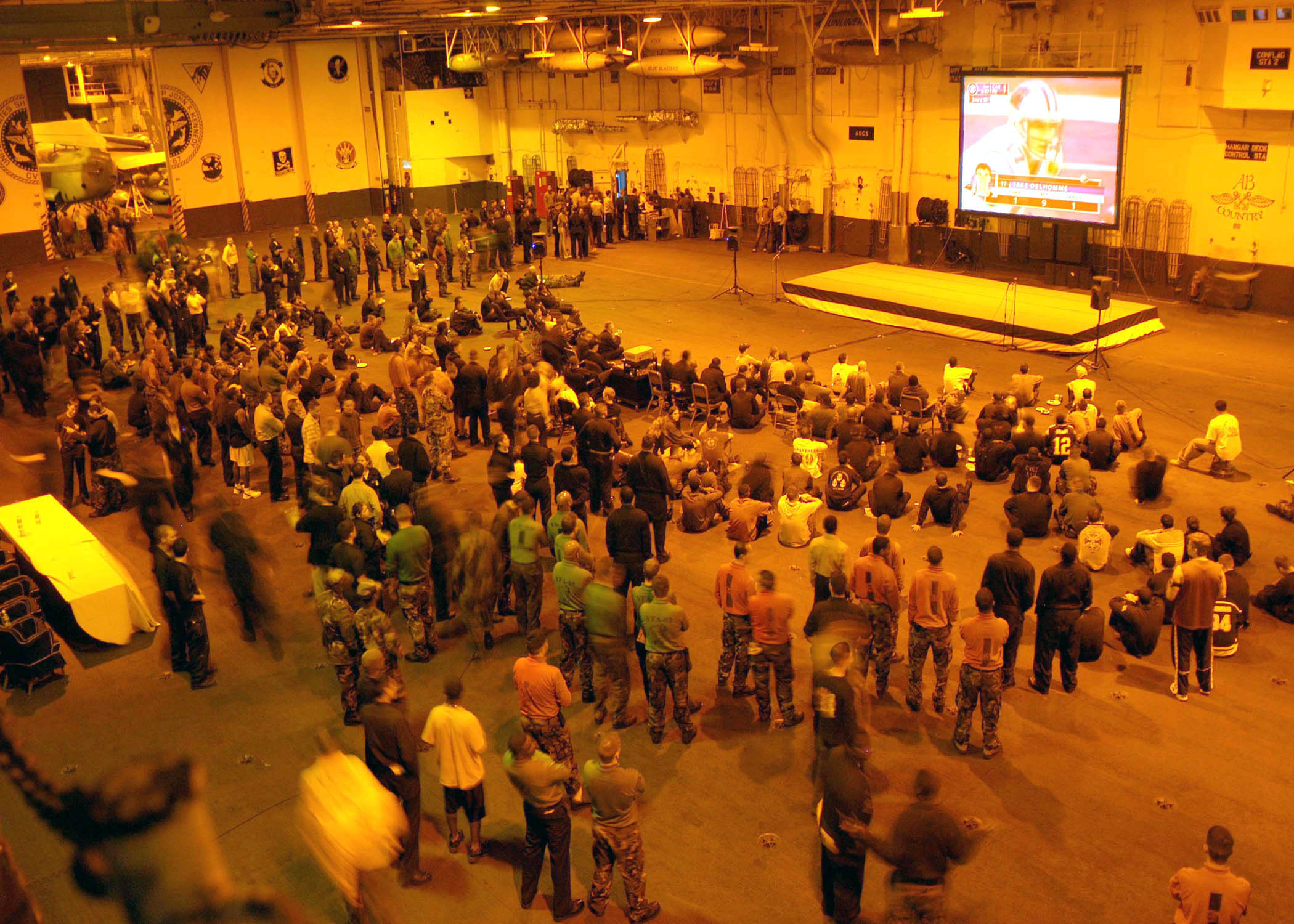
Sailors watching Super Bowl XXXVIII in the hangar bay aboard USS John F. Kennedy (CV-67)

The game was broadcast on television in the United States by CBS, with Greg Gumbel handling the play-by-play duties and color commentator Phil Simms in the broadcast booth. Armen Keteyian and Bonnie Bernstein roamed the sidelines. Jim Nantz hosted all the events with help from his fellow cast members from The NFL Today: Dan Marino, Deion Sanders, and Boomer Esiason. This would be the final Super Bowl game Greg Gumbel would call; as before the 2004 season began, he and Nantz would switch roles; though by the time CBS next aired a Super Bowl; James Brown was brought in as host of The NFL Today while Gumbel had moved to a secondary play-by-play role.

For its Super Bowl lead-out program, CBS aired the season premiere for Survivor: All-Stars.

Westwood One carried the game nationwide over terrestrial radio with Marv Albert on play-by-play and Boomer Esiason on color commentary, with Jim Gray hosting the pregame and halftime shows. Locally, Gil Santos and Gino Cappelletti called the game for the Patriots and Bill Rosinski and Eugene Robinson served that position for the Panthers. The game scored a 40.7 rating and over 43.4 million of household, making it the highest rated Super Bowl telecast since 1999 and making it watched Super Bow at the time with 89.8 million of average viewers. Also, Game experienced the highest traffic online at the time. Nielsen/NetRatings reported that over a million of user loging up by 266% over the prior day and 1.4 million of users visited ESPN.com.

=== International ===
The game also aired in United Kingdom and the Republic of Ireland on Channel 5 and Sky Sports, France on Canal+, Australia on public channel SBS, Japan on NHK BS1, China on CCTV-5, Austria on ORF 1 and Sweden on TV3.

In Mexico, the game was not carried as usual by either of the major free-to-air national television networks, making it a cable-exclusive event for the first and to date only time ever.

== Entertainment ==
=== Pregame ceremonies ===
Both teams passed on the opportunity for their starters to be introduced individually before the game, a move perpetuated by the Patriots in Super Bowl XXXVI. As the game was held in the same city as the Johnson Space Center, the lost crew of the Columbia was honored in a pregame tribute by singer Josh Groban, performing "You Raise Me Up". Also appearing on the field was the crew of STS-114, the "Return to Flight" Space Shuttle mission that eventually launched Space Shuttle Discovery on July 26, 2005. Houston-native Beyoncé then sang the national anthem. The anthem concluded with a flyover by a group of AH-64D Apache helicopters from the 149th Aviation Regiment of the Texas Army National Guard. Aerosmith performed Baby, Please Don't Go and Dream On as part of the pre-show ceremony.

The coin toss ceremony featured former NFL players and Texas natives Earl Campbell, Ollie Matson, Don Maynard, Y. A. Tittle, Mike Singletary, Gene Upshaw. Tittle tossed the coin.

The NFL logo was painted at midfield for the first time since Super Bowl XXX, and the Super Bowl XXXVIII logo was placed on the 25-yard lines. From Super Bowls XXXI through XXXVII, the Super Bowl logo was painted at midfield, and the helmets of the teams painted at the 30-yard lines. From Super Bowl VI through Super Bowl XXX, the NFL logo was painted on the 50-yard line, except for Super Bowls XXV and XXIX. The Super Bowl XXV logo was painted at midfield and the NFL logo was painted at each 35-yard line. In Super Bowl XXIX, the NFL 75th Anniversary logo was painted at midfield with the Super Bowl logo at each 30-yard line.

As the designated home team in the annual rotation between AFC and NFC teams, the Patriots elected to wear their home navy uniforms with silver pants, while the Panthers wore their road white uniforms with white pants.

=== Halftime show ===
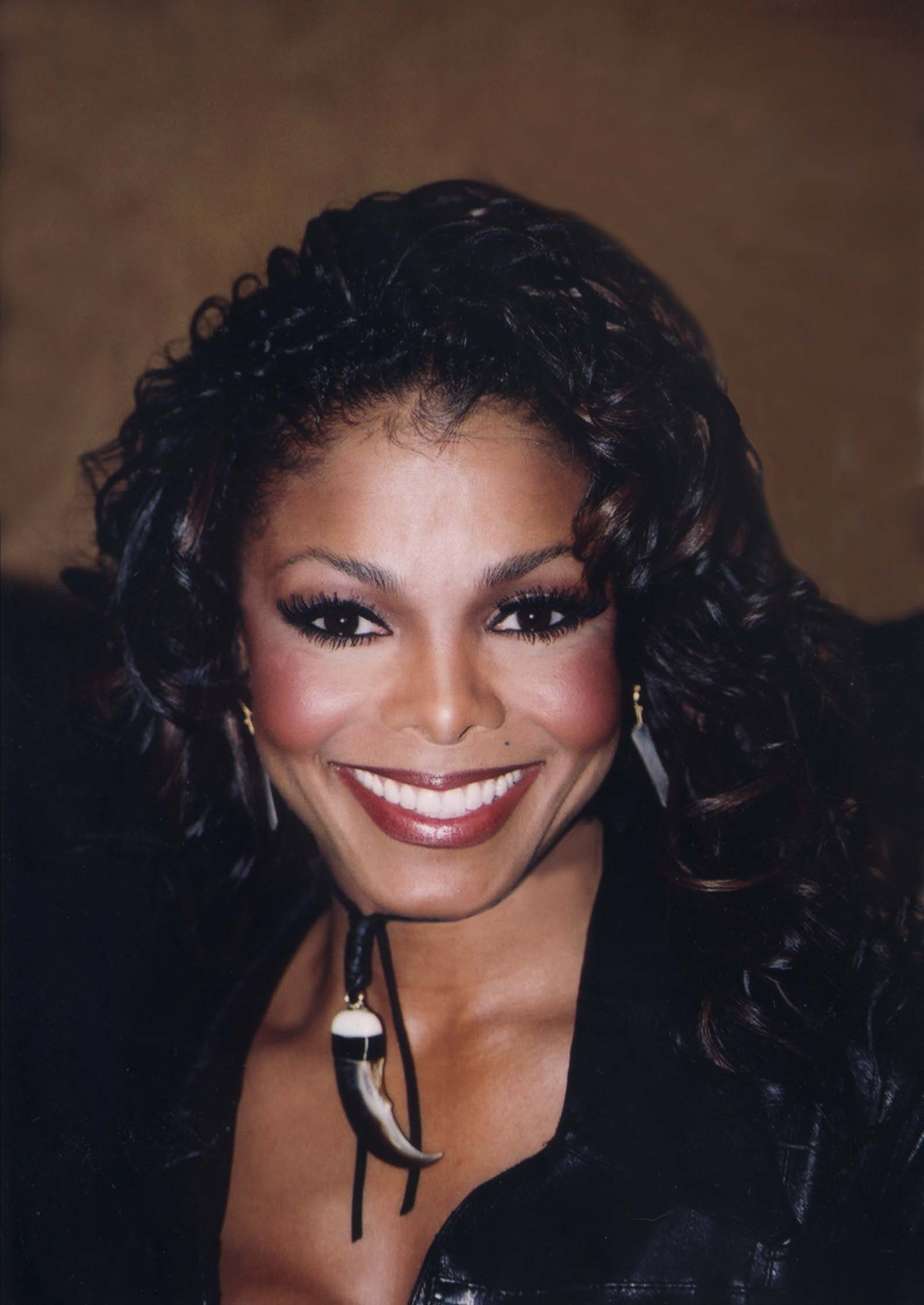
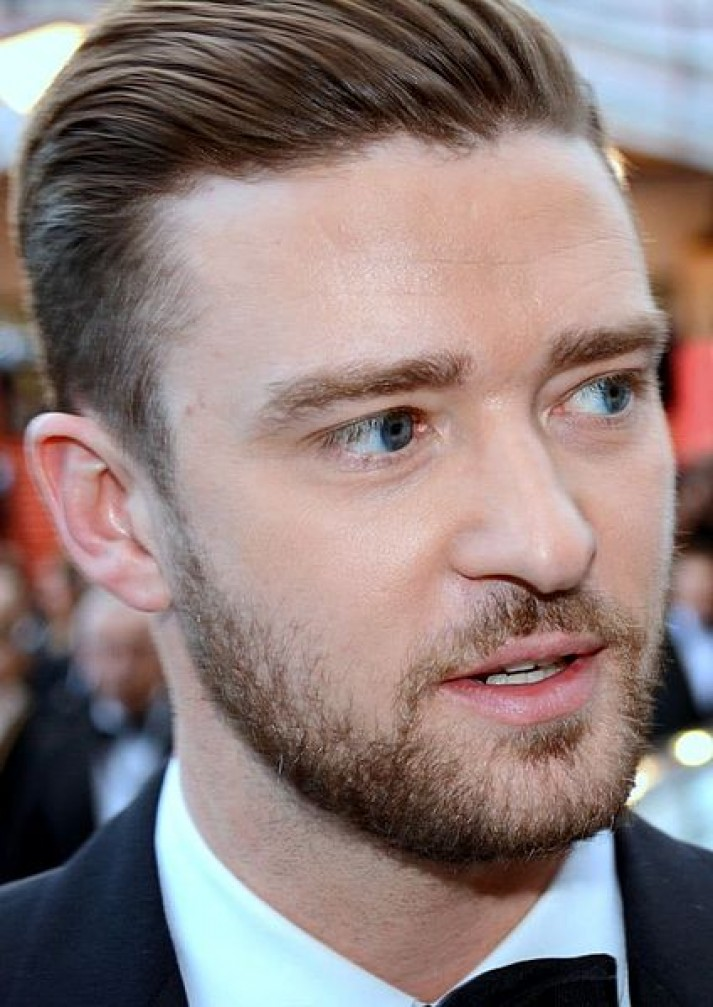
Janet Jackson (left) and Justin Timberlake (right) became the center of controversy during the end of the halftime show

The most controversial and widely discussed moment of Super Bowl XXXVIII came during halftime. The show was produced by Viacom's MTV and CBS Sports, and was sponsored by America Online's TopSpeed software for dial-up Internet service. The show was themed supposedly around MTV's Choose or Lose vote campaign; however, beyond some flag imagery, Jessica Simpson's declaration that Houston should "Choose to Party!" and a vague call to action for younger persons to vote (in a celebrity montage the first minute of the program and an audio outro about choices), the theme was not called out for the remainder of the show.

After a brief appearance by Simpson, the show began with a joint performance by marching bands the Spirit of Houston, from the University of Houston, and the "Ocean of Soul" of Texas Southern University. Next, Janet Jackson made her first appearance, singing "All for You". Then, P. Diddy, Nelly, and Kid Rock appeared respectively, and performed a mixture of their hits.

After Jackson's performance of her song "Rhythm Nation", Justin Timberlake appeared, and he and Jackson sang a duet of Timberlake's song "Rock Your Body". The performance featured many suggestive dance moves by both Timberlake and Jackson. As the song reached the final line, "I'm gonna have you naked by the end of this song," Timberlake pulled off a part of Jackson's costume, revealing her outer right breast (adorned with a large, sun-shaped nipple shield, a piece of jewelry worn to accentuate the appearance of a nipple piercing). CBS quickly cut to an aerial view of the stadium; however, the action was too late to be effective. Many people considered this indecent exposure, and numerous viewers contacted the network to complain, saying it was inappropriate in the context of a football game. This was the most rewatched moment in TiVo history.

Super Bowl XXXVIII halftime show
1. "The Way You Move"
2. "All for You"
3. "Hey Mickey"
4. "Hot in Herre"
5. "Mo Money Mo Problems"
6. "Bawitdaba"
7. "Cowboy"
8. "Rhythm Nation"
9. "The Knowledge"
10. "Rock Your Body"

Just before the start of the second half, a British streaker, Mark Roberts, ran onto the field disguised as a referee, undressed, and performed a dance wearing only a thong. He was tackled to the ground by Patriots linebacker Matt Chatham and arrested. It is customary for American television to avoid broadcasting such events, but it was later shown on Late Show with David Letterman. Roberts received a $1,000 fine for trespassing.

== Game summary ==
This game is noted for its unusual scoring pattern between the teams. Nearly 90 percent of the first half and all of the third quarter were scoreless. Twenty-four points were scored in the last three minutes of the first half, and a record 37 points were scored in the fourth quarter.

=== First quarter ===
Most of the first half was an offensive struggle, with neither team able to score until late in the second quarter, despite several early scoring opportunities. After the Panthers were forced to punt on their opening drive, Patriots wide receiver Troy Brown gave his team great field position with a 28-yard return to the Panthers' 47-yard line. The Patriots subsequently marched to the 13-yard line, aided by quarterback Tom Brady's completions to wide receiver Deion Branch and Brown for 16 and 12 yards, respectively, but the Panthers' defense tightened up in the red zone. After Brady threw two incompletions and was flagged for a false start, kicker Adam Vinatieri attempted a 31-yard field goal, but he missed it wide right. After the next three possessions resulted in punts, the Patriots again got the ball with great field position, receiving Todd Sauerbrun's 40-yard punt at the Panthers' 49-yard line. The Patriots then drove to the 31-yard line, but on third down, linebacker Will Witherspoon tackled Brown for a 10-yard loss on an end-around play, pushing the Patriots out of field goal range and forcing them to punt again.

=== Second quarter ===
After the teams exchanged punts twice going into the second quarter, the Patriots drove 57 yards to the Panthers' 18-yard line with just over 6 minutes left in the half, but once again they failed to score as the Panthers kept them out of the end zone and Vinatieri's 36-yard field goal attempt was blocked by defensive tackle Shane Burton.

Meanwhile, the Panthers' offense was overwhelmed by the Patriots' defense, with quarterback Jake Delhomme completing just one out of his first nine passes, being sacked three times and fumbling after the third sack. The fumble occurred three plays after Vinatieri's second missed field goal; Delhomme lost the ball while being hit by linebacker Mike Vrabel, and defensive tackle Richard Seymour recovered the ball at the Panthers' 20-yard line. By this point of the game, the Panthers had suffered a net loss of nine yards on 20 offensive snaps.

Two plays later, the Patriots faced 3rd-and-12, but Brady scrambled 12 yards to the 5-yard line for a first down, then completed a 5-yard touchdown pass to Branch on the next play. The play was a play-action fake to running back Antowain Smith. Panthers linebacker Dan Morgan bit on the route, causing the touchdown. Branch's touchdown came after 26:55 had elapsed in the game, setting the record for the longest amount of time a Super Bowl remained scoreless. The play also suddenly set off a scoring explosion from both teams in the closing minutes of the first half.

The Panthers stormed down the field on their ensuing possession, driving 95 yards in eight plays, which featured two receptions by wide receiver Ricky Proehl for 28 yards and a 23-yard catch by wide receiver Muhsin Muhammad, and ended with a 39-yard touchdown completion from Delhomme to wide receiver Steve Smith with just 1:07 left in the half.

The Patriots immediately countered with a 6-play, 78-yard scoring drive of their own. Starting from their own 22-yard line, Brady completed a 12-yard pass to wide receiver David Givens. Then after throwing an incompletion, Brady completed a 52-yard strike to Branch, who caught the ball at the Panthers' 24-yard line in stride before being tackled at the 14-yard line by cornerback Ricky Manning. Three plays later, Givens caught a 5-yard touchdown pass from Brady to give the Patriots a 14–7 lead with only 18 seconds left in the half. The Patriots decided to squib kick the ensuing kickoff to prevent a long return, but their plan backfired as Panthers tight end Kris Mangum picked up the ball at his own 35-yard line and returned it 12 yards to the 47. The Patriots expected a pass play from the Panthers, but instead running back Stephen Davis ran for 21 yards on the next play to set up kicker John Kasay's 50-yard field goal as time expired in the half, cutting the Panthers' deficit to 14–10.

=== Third quarter ===
The third quarter was scoreless as each team exchanged punts twice. However, with 3:57 left in the period, the Patriots put together a 71-yard, 8-play scoring drive, featuring tight end Daniel Graham's 33-yard reception to advance to the Panthers' 9-yard line.

=== Fourth quarter ===
Antowain Smith then capped off the drive with a 2-yard touchdown run on the second play of the fourth quarter to increase their lead, 21–10. The score changed the story of the game by sparking one of the biggest offensive explosions in Super Bowl history, with both teams scoring a combined 37 points in the last 15 minutes, the most ever in a single quarter of a Super Bowl.

The Patriots looked gassed, and the Panthers took advantage of it. Delhomme started out the Panthers' ensuing drive with a 13-yard completion to Muhammad. After guard Kevin Donnalley committed a false start penalty on the next play, Delhomme completed a pair of passes to Smith for a total gain of 40 yards. Running back DeShaun Foster then scored on a 33-yard touchdown run, cutting the Panthers' deficit to 21–16 after Delhomme's two-point conversion pass to Muhammad fell incomplete. The Patriots responded on their ensuing possession by driving to the Panthers' 9-yard line, only to turn the ball over when cornerback Reggie Howard intercepted a pass from Brady in the end zone and returned it to his own 10-yard line. Then on third down from his own 15-yard line, Delhomme threw for the longest play from scrimmage in Super Bowl history, an 85-yard touchdown completion to Muhammad. The Panthers' two-point conversion attempt failed again when Delhomme threw the ball over wide receiver Kevin Dyson's head, but they took their first lead of the game, 22–21, with 6:53 remaining. It was the first time in Super Bowl history a team down more than 10 points during the fourth quarter had come back to take the lead. Three other times teams have come back to tie the game; the Tennessee Titans against the St. Louis Rams in Super Bowl XXXIV, the Rams against the Patriots in Super Bowl XXXVI, and the Patriots against the Atlanta Falcons in Super Bowl LI.

However, the Panthers' lead did not last, as the Patriots retook the lead on their next drive, advancing 68 yards with the aid of a pair of completions from Brady to Givens for 43 total yards. Once again, the Patriots were faced with third down and goal, but this time they scored with Brady's 1-yard touchdown pass to Vrabel, who had lined up in an eligible tight end position. This marked the second time in Super Bowl history where a defensive player was brought on to score on offense; the first time being when Chicago Bears defensive tackle William "The Refrigerator" Perry scored an offensive touchdown during Super Bowl XX. On a two-point conversion attempt, running back Kevin Faulk took a direct snap and ran into the end zone to make the score 29–22 in favor of the Patriots. Despite amassing over 1,000 combined yards, Faulk's two-point conversion constituted the only points he scored all season. This was also the Patriots' only two-point conversion attempt all season.

The Panthers countered on their next possession. Foster started the drive with a 9-yard run and a 7-yard reception. After that, Delhomme completed a 19-yard pass to Muhammad, followed by a 31-yard completion to Proehl. Proehl, who caught the fourth quarter game-tying touchdown pass against the Patriots in Super Bowl XXXVI two years earlier for the St. Louis Rams, then finished the drive with a 12-yard touchdown reception, tying the game, 29–29, with 1:08 to play in regulation and it appeared that the game would be the first Super Bowl ever to go into overtime.

However, Kasay kicked the ensuing kickoff out of bounds, giving the Patriots the ball on their own 40-yard line. Brady led the Patriots offense down the field with a 13-yard pass to Brown on second down. An offensive pass interference penalty on Brown pushed the Patriots back to their own 43-yard line, but another 13-yard pass to Brown and a 4-yard pass to Graham brought up a critical 3rd-and-3 from the Panthers' 40-yard line. The Panthers' defense could not prevent the Patriots from gaining the first down, as Brady completed a 17-yard pass to Branch. On the next play, Vinatieri kicked a 41-yard field goal to give the Patriots the lead, 32–29, with four seconds left in the game. The Panthers failed on their last chance, as wide receiver Rod Smart was tackled at his own 20-yard line by linebacker Matt Chatham, and the Patriots had won their second Super Bowl in three years. This was (at the time) just the fourth Super Bowl to be decided on a field goal in the final seconds (Super Bowl V was won on a last second kick by the Baltimore Colts' Jim O'Brien to defeat the Dallas Cowboys, Super Bowl XXV had the Buffalo Bills' Scott Norwood miss his field goal chance against the New York Giants, and in Super Bowl XXXVI Vinatieri made his to defeat the St. Louis Rams, and later in Super Bowl LVII, Chiefs kicker Harrison Butker kicked a late field goal to defeat the Philadelphia Eagles).

=== Box score ===
Super Bowl XXXVIII: New England Patriots 32, Carolina Panthers 29

Quarter	1	2	3	4	Total
Panthers (NFC)	0	10	0	19	29
Patriots (AFC)	0	14	0	18	32

at Reliant Stadium, Houston, Texas

- Date: February 1, 2004
- Game time: 5:25 p.m. CST
- Game weather: 59 °F (15 °C), played with roof closed, retractable roof stadium

Scoring summary

Quarter	Time	Drive			Team	Scoring information	Score	
Quarter	Time	Plays	Yards	TOP	Team	Scoring information	CAR	NE
2	3:05	4	20	2:10	NE	Deion Branch 5-yard touchdown reception from Tom Brady, Adam Vinatieri kick good	0	7
2	1:07	8	95	1:58	CAR	Steve Smith 39-yard touchdown reception from Jake Delhomme, John Kasay kick good	7	7
2	0:18	6	78	0:49	NE	David Givens 5-yard touchdown reception from Brady, Vinatieri kick good	7	14
2	0:00	2	21	0:18	CAR	50-yard field goal by Kasay	10	14
4	14:49	8	71	4:08	NE	Antowain Smith 2-yard touchdown run, Vinatieri kick good	10	21
4	12:39	6	81	2:10	CAR	DeShaun Foster 33-yard touchdown run, 2-point pass no good	16	21
4	6:53	3	90	0:45	CAR	Muhsin Muhammad 85-yard touchdown reception from Delhomme, 2-point pass no good	22	21
4	2:51	11	68	4:02	NE	Mike Vrabel 1-yard touchdown reception from Brady, 2-point run good (Kevin Faulk)	22	29
4	1:08	7	80	1:43	CAR	Ricky Proehl 12-yard touchdown reception from Delhomme, Kasay kick good	29	29
4	0:04	6	37	1:04	NE	41-yard field goal by Vinatieri	29	32
"TOP" = time of possession. For other American football terms, see Glossary of American football.							29	32

=== Statistical overview ===
The game set a number of marks for offensive production. The two teams combined for 868 yards of total offense, the second-highest total in Super Bowl history. Both starting quarterbacks threw for at least 300 yards for only the second time in Super Bowl history, with Dan Marino and Joe Montana each passing for at least 300 yards in Super Bowl XIX. This was also only the second Super Bowl to feature one 100-yard receiving performance on each team, with Deion Branch and Muhsin Muhammad each reaching 100 yards. Andre Reed and Michael Irvin first accomplished the feat in Super Bowl XXVII.

The 37 total points scored in the 4th quarter were the most combined points in a 4th quarter in a Super Bowl and the most in any quarter by two teams. Washington's 35 points in Super Bowl XXII was the previous high for most combined points in a single quarter in a Super Bowl. The fourth quarter was the second in Super Bowl history to have five touchdowns scored in a single quarter, the first being when the Redskins had five in Super Bowl XXII in the second quarter. It was also the first time in Super Bowl history that both teams would score at least two touchdowns in the same quarter.

Delhomme finished the game with 16 completions out of 33 attempts for 323 yards, three touchdowns, and no interceptions for a passer rating of 113.6. He was seen standing on the field during the Patriots' post-game celebration; he later commented: "I wanted to catch up to the moment of what it feels like to be on the other side, to be on this side, the losing side. To let it sink in, to hurt, so when we start practice in the fall, the two-a-days and there are days during the season when I'm tired and I want to go home, but I need to watch that extra film. I want to get back there, but I want to get on the other side of that field. They rope you off, the losing team basically. I just want to get on the other side of that rope. I just wanted to watch and let it sink in and hurt a little bit. When I have a tough day, I'll just think about that feeling and it will make me dig down just a little deeper."

Muhsin Muhammad caught four passes for 140 yards, an average of 35 yards per catch, and a touchdown. Steve Smith caught four passes for 80 yards and a touchdown. He also returned a punt for two yards, and returned a kickoff for 30 yards, giving him 112 total yards. Proehl caught four passes for 71 yards and a touchdown. Proehl joined Jerry Rice as one of only two players to score touchdowns with two teams in Super Bowls.

Tom Brady's 32 completions were the most in Super Bowl history. His 48 attempts were the most for a winning quarterback. His 354 yards passing is now the fifth best total in Super Bowl history. Brady's passer rating for this game was 100.5. Branch was the top receiver of the game with 10 receptions for 143 yards and a touchdown. Brown caught 8 passes for 76 yards and returned four punts for 40 yards. Antowain Smith was the top rusher of the game with 83 yards and a touchdown.

== Final statistics ==
Sources: NFL.com Super Bowl XXXVIII, Super Bowl XXXVIII Play Finder NE, Super Bowl XXXVIII Play Finder Car, USA Today Super Bowl XXXVIII Play by Play

=== Statistical comparison ===
Statistic	Carolina Panthers	New England Patriots
First downs	17	29
First downs rushing	3	7
First downs passing	12	19
First downs penalty	2	3
Third down efficiency	4/12	8/17
Fourth down efficiency	0/0	1/1
Net yards rushing	92	127
Rushing attempts	16	35
Yards per rush	5.8	3.6
Passing – Completions-attempts	16/33	32/48
Times sacked-total yards	4–28	0–0
Interceptions thrown	0	1
Net yards passing	295	354
Total net yards	387	481
Punt returns-total yards	1–2	5–42
Kickoff returns-total yards	6–116	4–78
Interceptions-total return yards	1–12	0–0
Punts-average yardage	7–44.3	5–34.6
Fumbles-lost	1–1	1–0
Penalties-yards	12–73	8–60
Time of possession	21:02	38:58
Turnovers	1	1

=== Individual statistics ===
Panthers passing
	C/ATT^{1}	Yds	TD	INT	Rating
Jake Delhomme	16/33	323	3	0	113.6
Panthers rushing
	Car^{2}	Yds	TD	LG^{3}	Yds/Car
Stephen Davis	13	49	0	21	3.77
DeShaun Foster	3	43	1	33t	14.33
Panthers receiving
	Rec^{4}	Yds	TD	LG^{3}	Target^{5}
Muhsin Muhammad	4	140	1	85t	10
Steve Smith	4	80	1	39t	9
Ricky Proehl	4	71	1	31	5
Jermaine Wiggins	2	21	0	15	2
DeShaun Foster	1	9	0	9	2
Kris Mangum	1	2	0	2	3
Brad Hoover	0	0	0	0	1

Patriots passing
	C/ATT^{1}	Yds	TD	INT	Rating
Tom Brady	32/48	354	3	1	100.5
Patriots rushing
	Car^{2}	Yds	TD	LG^{3}	Yds/Car
Antowain Smith	26	83	1	9	3.19
Kevin Faulk	6	42	0	23	7.00
Tom Brady	2	12	0	12	6.00
Troy Brown	1	–10	0	–10	–10.00
Patriots receiving
	Rec^{4}	Yds	TD	LG^{3}	Target^{5}
Deion Branch	10	143	1	52	13
Troy Brown	8	76	0	13	10
David Givens	5	69	1	25	11
Daniel Graham	4	46	0	33	4
Kevin Faulk	4	19	0	7	4
Mike Vrabel	1	1	1	1t	1
Larry Centers	0	0	0	0	1
Christian Fauria	0	0	0	0	1
Bethel Johnson	0	0	0	0	1
Dedric Ward	0	0	0	0	1

^{1}Completions/attempts ^{2}Carries ^{3}Long gain ^{4}Receptions ^{5}Times targeted

== Starting lineups ==
Hall of Fame‡

Carolina	Position	Position	New England
Offense
Muhsin Muhammad	WR		Deion Branch
Todd Steussie	LT		Matt Light
Jeno James	LG		Russ Hochstein
Jeff Mitchell	C		Dan Koppen
Kevin Donnalley	RG		Joe Andruzzi
Jordan Gross	RT		Tom Ashworth
Jermaine Wiggins	TE		Daniel Graham
Steve Smith	WR		Troy Brown
Jake Delhomme	QB		Tom Brady
Stephen Davis	RB		Antowain Smith
Brad Hoover	FB		Larry Centers
Defense
Julius Peppers‡	LDE	LE	Bobby Hamilton
Brentson Buckner	LDT	NT	Ted Washington
Kris Jenkins	RDT	RE	Richard Seymour‡
Mike Rucker	RDE	OLB	Willie McGinest
Greg Favors	SLB	ILB	Tedy Bruschi
Dan Morgan	MLB	ILB	Roman Phifer
Will Witherspoon	WLB	OLB	Mike Vrabel
Ricky Manning Jr.	LCB		Ty Law‡
Reggie Howard	RCB		Tyrone Poole
Mike Minter	SS	S	Eugene Wilson
Deon Grant	FS	S	Rodney Harrison

== Gambling ==
The over-under bet was set at 37.5 by most sportsbooks. As the total combined score of the two teams was 61 points, the over bet won.

== Officials ==
- Referee: Ed Hochuli #85 second Super Bowl (XXXII)
- Umpire: Jeff Rice #44 second Super Bowl (XXXVI)
- Head linesman: Mark Hittner #28 second Super Bowl (XXXVI)
- Line judge: Ben Montgomery #117 second Super Bowl (XXXII)
- Field judge: Tom Sifferman #118 second Super Bowl (XXXVII)
- Side judge: Laird Hayes #125 second Super Bowl (XXXV)
- Back judge: Scott Green #19 second Super Bowl (XXXVI)
- Alternate referee: Bill Carollo #63 (side judge for XXXI, referee for XXXVII)
- Alternate umpire: Jim Quirk #5 (umpire for XXXII)
- Alternate field judge: Bill Lovett #98 (field judge for XXXIII)

Tom Sifferman became the second official to work consecutive Super Bowls on the field. The first was Jim Tunney, the referee for Super Bowls XI and XII.
