= Long Live Nut =

EP by YFN Lucci
- Released: April 4, 2017
- Length: 32:48
- Label: T.I.G.; Empire
- Producer: Fly (exec.); YFN Lucci (also exec.); Sose (also exec.); Donis Beats; Edimah; Fatman; June James; Metro Boomin; OG Parker; Ramy on the Beat; Tino; Will-A-Fool

YFN Lucci chronology
Wish Me Well 2 (2016)	Long Live Nut (2017)	Freda's Son (2018)

Singles from Long Live Nut
- 1. "Everyday We Lit" Released: December 16, 2016; 2. "Never Worried" Released: February 7, 2017; 3. "Ammunition" Released: March 1, 2017

Long Live Nut is the debut EP by American rapper YFN Lucci. It was released on April 4, 2017, by Think It's A Game Records and Empire Distribution. It features guest appearances from Rick Ross, Boosie Badazz, Lil Durk, PnB Rock, Dreezy, and YFN Trae Pound.

== Commercial performance ==
The EP debuted at number 27 on the US Billboard 200.

== Track listing ==
Credits were adapted from Tidal.

No.	Title	Writer(s)	Producer(s)	Length
1.	"Way Up"	Rayshawn Bennett; June James; Ramiro Morales	June James; Ramy on the Beat	5:02
2.	"Heartless" (featuring Rick Ross and Bigga Rankin)	Bennett; Willie Byrd; William Roberts	Will-A-Fool	3:36
3.	"Ammunition" (featuring YFN Trae Pound)	Bennett; Leland Wayne; Lawrence Jones	Metro Boomin	4:35
4.	"Been Broke Before"	Bennett; James; Morales; Joshua Parker; Amir Cuyler; Gregory Reid; Terence Williams	June James; OG Parker; Edimah^{[a]}	3:21
5.	"10 AM" (featuring Dreezy)	Bennett; Keante Morton; Seandrea Sledge	Tino Burna	2:58
6.	"Everyday We Lit" (featuring PnB Rock)	Bennett; James; Rakim Allen	June James	3:17
7.	"Never Worried"	Bennett; James; Morales	June James; Ramy on the Beat	3:25
8.	"Turn They Back" (featuring Lil Durk)	Bennett; Adonis Amos-Staton; Durk Banks	Donis Beats; Fatman^{[b]}	3:14
9.	"Testimony" (featuring Boosie Badazz)	Bennett; Parker; Torrence Hatch	OG Parker	3:20
Total length:				32:48

Notes

- ^{^[a]} signifies an additional producer
- ^{^[b]} signifies an uncredited co-producer
- "Heartless" features additional vocals from Nut

== Personnel ==
Credits were adapted from the album's liner notes.

Performers

- YFN Lucci – primary artist
- Rick Ross – featured artist (track 2)
- YFN Trae Pound – featured artist (track 3)
- Dreezy – featured artist (track 5)
- PnB Rock – featured artist (track 6)
- Lil Durk – featured artist (track 8)
- Boosie Badazz – featured artist (track 9)

Technical

- Keith Dawson – mixing engineer (all tracks), recording engineer (track 6)
- John Horesco – mastering engineer (all tracks)

Production

- June James – producer (tracks 1, 4, 6, 7)
- Ramy on the Beat – producer (tracks 1, 7)
- Will-A-Fool – producer (track 2)
- Metro Boomin – producer (track 3)
- OG Parker – producer (tracks 4, 9)
- Edimah – additional producer (track 4)
- Tino Burna – producer (track 5)
- Donis Beats – producer (track 8)
- Fatman – uncredited co-producer (track 8)

Additional personnel

- YFN Lucci – executive producer
- Girvan "Fly" Henry – executive producer
- Osose "Sose" Ebadan – A&R direction
- Daeshawn "Dae-Day" Shelton – A&R direction, art design and direction
- Kim Dockery – A&R administration
- Jhadrick Ferell – manager
- Cam Kirk – photography
- Brandon Leach – art design and direction

== Charts ==
=== Weekly charts ===
Chart (2017)	Peak position
US Billboard 200	27
US Top R&B/Hip-Hop Albums (Billboard)	16
US Top Rap Albums (Billboard)	12

=== Year-end charts ===
Chart (2017)	Position
US Billboard 200	193
US Top R&B/Hip-Hop Albums (Billboard)	95
