= Jan. 31st (My Truth) =

2025 single by YFN Lucci

Single by YFN Lucci

from the album Already Legend
- Released: May 23, 2025
- Length: 2:49
- Label: Think It's a Game
- Songwriters: Rayshawn Bennett; Gabe Lucas; Kai Hasegawa
- Producers: Lucas; Kaigoinkrazy

YFN Lucci singles chronology
"Same Way" (2024)	"Jan. 31st (My Truth)" (2025)

Music video
- "Jan. 31st (My Truth)" on YouTube

"Jan. 31st (My Truth)" is a song by American rapper YFN Lucci, released on May 23, 2025. It was produced by Gabe Lucas and Kaigoinkrazy.

== Background ==
"Jan. 31st (My Truth)" is YFN Lucci's first single since 2021, when he was charged in a RICO indictment. He spent three years in prison and was released on January 31, 2025, after pleading guilty to racketeering charges earlier that month. In the song, Lucci recounts his charges, serving his sentence and the challenges he endured during the period. According to a press release:

"Jan. 31st (My Truth)" delivers the emotional authenticity fans have loved and craved—a compelling, vulnerable track that stays true to his formula of speaking straight from the heart. The lyrics and hook stand as powerful testimony to his first thoughts and feelings as a free man after time served towards his sentence, while the carefully chosen artwork showcases what matters most: his children, his world. Since returning, Lucci has maintained laser focus, diving headfirst back into fatherhood while pouring himself into his art and community, committed to personal growth daily. His trademark singing-rapping fusion remains intact, but this first single since his release unveils a new chapter where vulnerability reigns supreme—no matter how uncomfortable the truth.

Lucci has also stated:

This new single is just me — raw and in the moment, making music the only way I know how; straight from how I feel. The hook is a headline of my truth, down to the artwork. It says it all. We did a fly family shoot when I came home and those photos are visuals of my heartbeats. It had to be the artwork. It represents my love for my kids and how much I missed them. When you see me stepping back into the spotlight, you're seeing what matters most standing right beside me. The business is locked in, the vault is ready to open and I’m beyond ready to get back in motion and let the people hear me. The comeback is just the beginning.

== Charts ==
Chart performance for "Jan. 31st (My Truth)"
Chart (2025)	Peak position
US Bubbling Under Hot 100 (Billboard)	4
US Hot R&B/Hip-Hop Songs (Billboard)	18
