= Wet (YFN Lucci song) =

2020 single by YFN Lucci

Single by YFN Lucci

from the album Wish Me Well 3
- Released: February 14, 2020
- Length: 3:30
- Label: T.I.G.; Warner
- Songwriter: Rayshawn Bennett
- Producer: Billy Garcia

YFN Lucci singles chronology
"Big Ole" (2019)	"Wet" (2020)	"Wet (Remix)" (2020)

Music video
- "Wet (She Got That...)" on YouTube

"Wet" (also titled "Wet (She Got That...)") is a song by American rapper YFN Lucci, released on February 14, 2020 as the lead single from his seventh mixtape Wish Me Well 3 (2020). The song finds YFN Lucci sing-rapping about having sex with a woman, over a piano-based melody instrumental. It gained popularity on the video-sharing app TikTok.

== Remixes ==
In September 2020, YFN Lucci released a Wet Remix Pack, with three remixes of the song. The official remix was released on September 18, 2020, and features American rapper Mulatto.

== Music video ==
A music video for the song was released on June 25, 2020, and the music video for the official remix of the song premiered on December 18, 2020. The latter visual was directed by BPace Productions; it mainly shows YFN Lucci and Mulatto in a swimming pool. Lucci also spends time with a woman in a sauna, and displays his grill and jewelry at times in the clip, while Mulatto is rapping in a massage room. Comedian Desi Banks also makes a cameo, in which he joins Mulatto in getting a massage.

== Charts ==
Chart (2020)	Peak position
US Billboard Hot 100	92
US Hot R&B/Hip-Hop Songs (Billboard)	33

== Certifications ==
Region	Certification	Certified units/sales
United States (RIAA)	Platinum	1,000,000^{‡}
^{‡} Sales+streaming figures based on certification alone.
