= Everyday We Lit =

Single by YFN Lucci featuring PnB Rock

from the album Long Live Nut
- Released: December 16, 2016
- Recorded: 2016
- Genre: Hip hop
- Length: 3:17: 4:01 (remix with Lil Yachty & Wiz Khalifa)
- Label: T.I.G.; Empire
- Songwriters: Rayshawn Bennett; Rakim Allen; June James
- Producer: June James

YFN Lucci singles chronology
"Key to the Streets" (2016)	"Everyday We Lit" (2016)	"On My Grind" (2017)

PnB Rock singles chronology
"Selfish" (2016)	"Everyday We Lit" (2016)	"Gang Up" (2017)

Music video
- "Everyday We Lit" on YouTube

"Everyday We Lit" is a song by American rapper YFN Lucci featuring fellow American rapper PnB Rock. It was released on December 16, 2016, as the first single from Lucci's debut EP Long Live Nut (2017), and written alongside producer June James. The song peaked at number 33 on the Billboard Hot 100, becoming YFN Lucci's highest charting single on the chart and PnB Rock's second highest peak on the chart, behind his appearance on Ed Sheeran's "Cross Me", which peaked at number 25 on the Hot 100. The song was used in the 2017 season premiere of HBO’s Hard Knocks featuring the Tampa Bay Buccaneers.

== Music video ==
The official lyric video for "Everyday We Lit" was uploaded to Lucci's Vevo channel on December 16, 2016. The music video, directed by Marc Diamond, premiered on the same channel on April 4, 2017. As of February 2025, the music video has 191 million views.

== Remix ==
The official remix of the song. with additional features from Wiz Khalifa and Lil Yachty, was released on May 11, 2017.

== Charts ==
=== Weekly charts ===
Chart (2017)	Peak position
US Billboard Hot 100	33
US Hot R&B/Hip-Hop Songs (Billboard)	12
US Rhythmic Airplay (Billboard)	4

=== Year-end charts ===
Chart (2017)	Position
US Billboard Hot 100	95
US Hot R&B/Hip-Hop Songs (Billboard)	43
US Rhythmic (Billboard)	41

== Certifications ==
Region	Certification	Certified units/sales
Canada (Music Canada)	Gold	40,000^{‡}
United States (RIAA)	2× Platinum	2,000,000^{‡}
^{‡} Sales+streaming figures based on certification alone.
