= Spirit of Houston =

Marching band of the University of Houston

- School: University of Houston
- Location: Houston, Texas
- Conference: Big 12
- Founded: 1946
- Director: Cameron Kubos
- Members: 270
- Fight song: "Cougar Fight Song"
- Website: uhbandsandspiritgroups.com

The Spirit of Houston encompasses the Cougar Marching Band and various Spirit groups at the University of Houston, including the UH Cheer teams, the Cougar Dolls Dance Team, the UH Feature Twirlers, the Mascots, and the Cougar Brass. The Spirit of Houston operates under the leadership of Cameron Kubos, who serves as the Director of Athletic Bands and Spirit Groups.

The Cougar Marching Band has a distinctive sound, influenced by previous directors such as Bill Moffit, Robert Mayes, and David Bertman. The band comprises approximately 270 students, with around ⅓ being music majors. Notable former directors include Marc Martin, Troy Bennefield, and John Alstrin.

== History ==
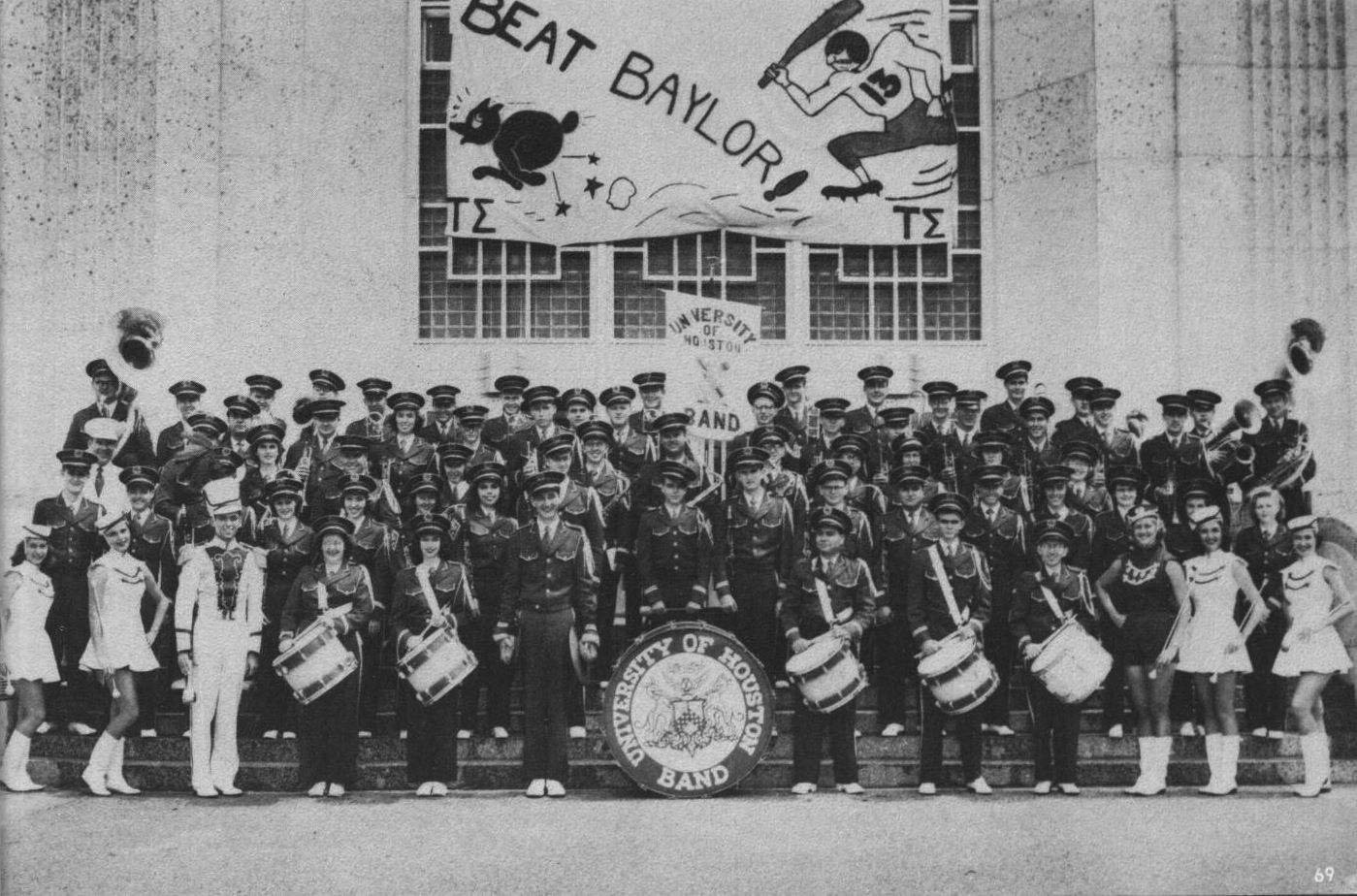
The Spirit of Houston Cougar Marching Band, 1951

From the late 1960s to the early 1980s, the Spirit of Houston was led by Bill Moffit, who is credited with developing the Patterns in Motion marching style, which gained prominence during his time at the University of Houston. Moffit was also known for his arrangements of both traditional band music and contemporary popular songs.

After Moffit left to join Purdue University, Greg Talford became the director. Originally from Michigan, Talford introduced drum corps-style elements to the band, emphasized the memorization of all music, and implemented regular sectionals. Robert Mayes succeeded Talford, joining UH after positions at Texas Tech and the University of Wyoming. Under Mayes' leadership, the Cougar Marching Band performed internationally, with trips to Japan, England, Ireland, France, and Mexico.

In 2000, David Bertman was appointed as the director of the Spirit of Houston, with the responsibility of upholding the established traditions. The Cougar Marching Band continued to support the University of Houston by performing at Houston Cougars football games. After Bertman was promoted to Director of Bands, Troy Bennefield assumed the role of marching band director in 2011. In the summer of 2018, Cameron Kubos became the director of the Spirit of Houston. The UH Drumline is led by Scott Taylor.

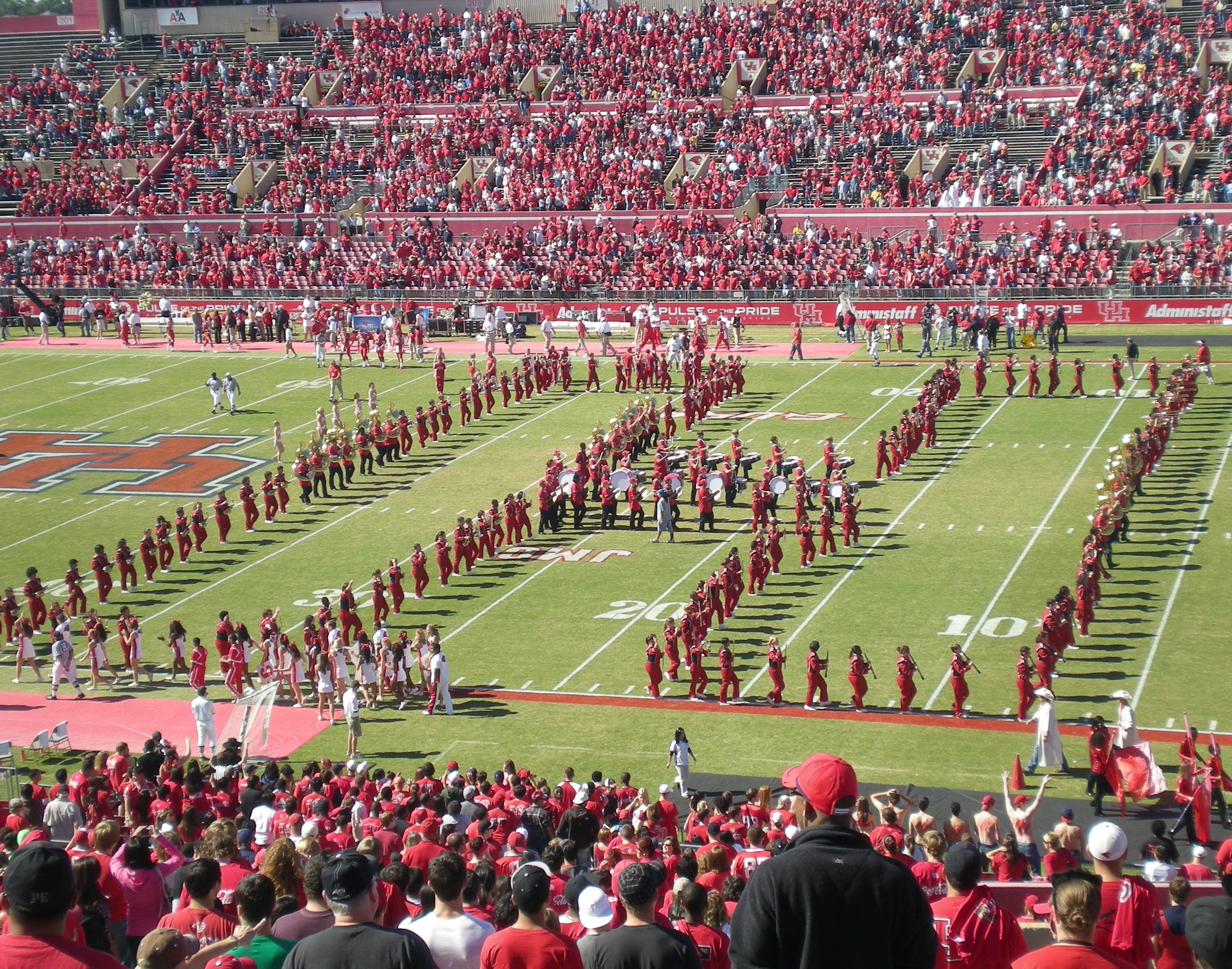
The Spirit of Houston Cougar Marching Band during a pre-game show at Robertson Stadium

In 2004, the Spirit of Houston was featured in the Super Bowl XXXVIII halftime show.

On November 14, 2015, the Spirit of Houston performed "Gwan" with the Gulf Coast Soul Band, The Suffers, during the football halftime show.

During the spring 2018 semester, associate director Marc Martin resigned from his position after being found guilty in an investigation conducted by the University of inappropriate behavior toward multiple students.

On September 24, 2022, the Spirit of Houston performed "Red Alert" alongside Paul Wall and Bun B, during the football halftime show.

== Music ==
The Spirit of Houston's primary repertoire includes the following:

- "Cougar Fight Song", the university's official fight song
- "Eat 'Em Up", a secondary fight song of the university was originally written by director Bill Moffit, and subsequently used by most other college marching bands today
- "The Horse"
- "Womp Womp"
- “Hustlin’”
- "June 27th"

== Branch ==
- The UH Cheer team is under the direction of Spirit Coordinator Khristal Harbert and Cheer Coach Tennille Williams.
- The UH Cougar Dolls are under the direction of Spirit Coordinator Khristal Harbert and Dolls Coach Tatiana Kane.
- The Cougar Brass is the University of Houston's basketball band and is currently under the direction of Cameron Kubos.
- The UH Feature Twirlers under the direction of Kayli Mickey-McIntosh.

== See also ==
- Moores School of Music
