= YFN Lucci =

American rapper (born 1991)

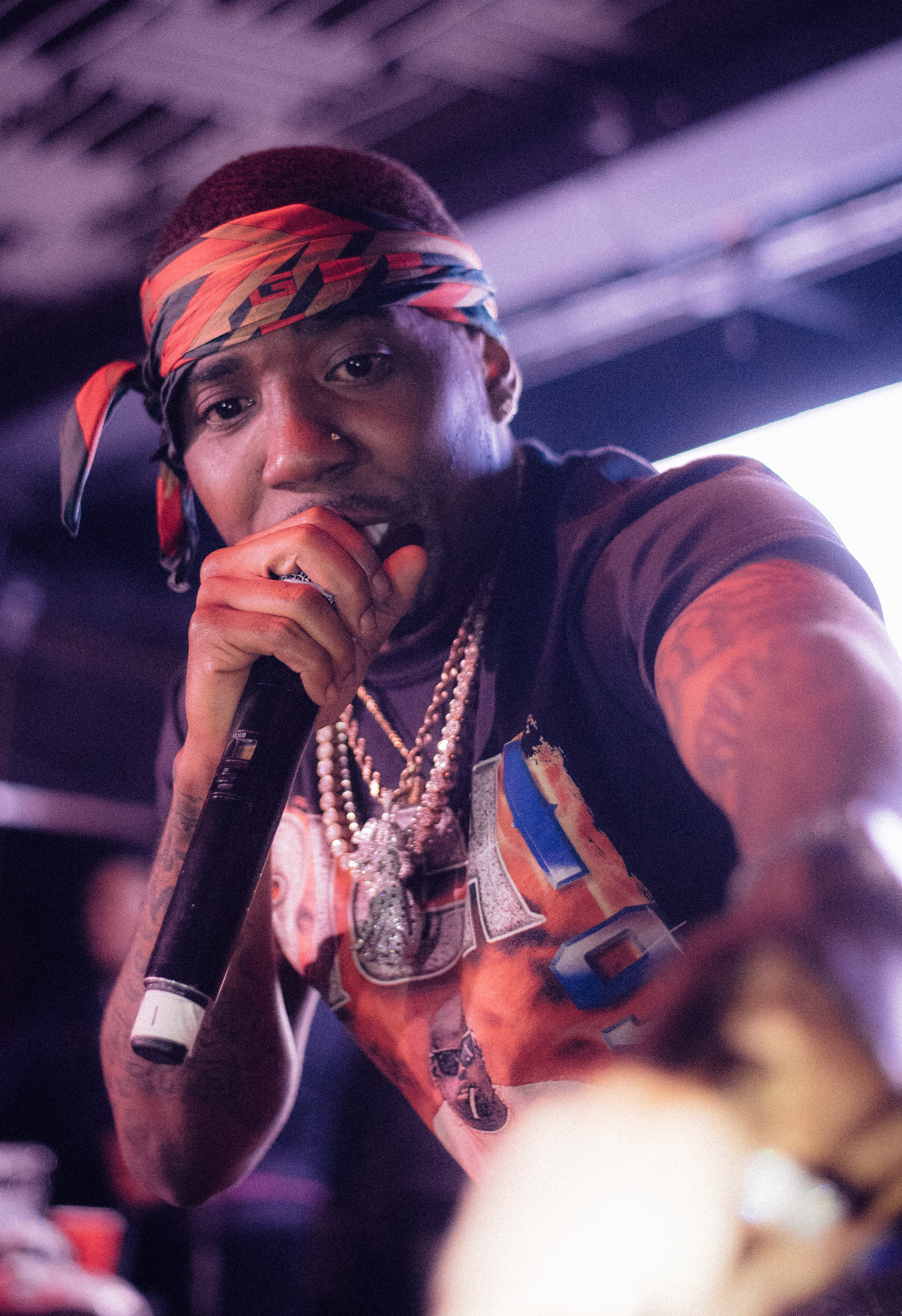
- YFN Lucci performing in 2017

Background information
- Born: Rayshawn Lamar Bennett; February 16, 1991 (age 35); Atlanta, Georgia, U.S.
- Genre: Southern hip-hop
- Occupations: Rapper; singer; songwriter
- Works: YFN Lucci discography
- Years active: 2014–present
- Labels: Think It's A Game (T.I.G.); Warner; YFNBC
- Producer(s): June James
- Children: 4
- Website: yfnlucci.com

Logo
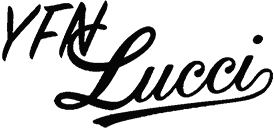

Rayshawn Lamar Bennett (born February 16, 1991), known professionally as YFN Lucci (acronym for Young Fly Nigga Lucci), is an American rapper and singer. Bennett signed with Think It's A Game Entertainment to release his first two mixtapes Wish Me Well (2014) and Wish Me Well 2 (2016); the latter marked his first entry on the Billboard 200, and was led by the single "Key to the Streets" (featuring Migos and Trouble)—his first Billboard Hot 100 entry. His debut extended play (EP), Long Live Nut (2017), spawned the single "Everyday We Lit" (featuring PnB Rock), which peaked at number 33 on the Billboard Hot 100 and remains his highest-charting song.

His debut studio album, Ray Ray from Summerhill (2018), peaked at number 14 on the Billboard 200. In May 2021, he was arrested following a statewide manhunt and charged with 11 others in a RICO indictment. On January 23, 2024, Bennett pleaded guilty to one count of violation of Georgia's Street Gang Terrorism and Prevention Act and was sentenced to serve ten years in prison and ten years on probation; he was credited for time already served. On January 31, 2025, Bennett was released from prison.

== Early life ==
Rayshawn Lamar Bennett was born in Atlanta to Jamaican immigrant parents. He grew up listening to fellow Atlanta rappers such as T.I., and Jeezy. He discovered his own musical talent at age 16 and was encouraged to take it seriously by rapper Johnny Cinco. Lucci's older brother is also a rapper, who goes by the name YFN KAY.

== Career ==
=== 2014–2016: Beginnings and breakthrough ===
In December 2014, Lucci signed a record deal with Think It's A Game Entertainment and released his debut mixtape, Wish Me Well. In February 2016, he released the Wish Me Well 2 mixtape, which peaked at number 183 on the US Billboard 200 chart. The mixtape's hit single "Key to the Streets" featuring Migos and Trouble, peaked at number 70 on the US Billboard Hot 100 chart. The official remix version of the song featured 2 Chainz, Lil Wayne and Quavo. "Key to the Streets" was included on XXL magazine's 50 Best Hip-Hop Songs of 2016 list and Vibe magazine's The 60 Best Songs Of 2016 list. The mixtape's second single is "YFN" which was accompanied by a music video. A behind the scenes of "YFN" was filmed by StayOnGrindTV's Director LookImHD and released on Risinghype.com, YouTube.com & WorldStarHipHop.com.

In September 2016, Lucci along with Migos, 21 Savage, Kap G, Young Dolph and Zaytoven was featured on the cover of Rolling Out magazine's "Hidden Hip-Hop Gems of Summer 16" issue. In October 2016, rapper Meek Mill released the track "You Know" featuring Lucci, which peaked at number nine on the Bubbling Under Hot 100 Singles chart and appeared on Mill's DC4 mixtape. In December 2016, Billboard magazine included Lucci in its 10 Hip-Hop and R&B Artists to Watch In 2017 list.

=== Since 2017: Long Live Nut, Ray Ray From Summerhill ===
In April 2017, Lucci released his debut extended play, Long Live Nut, featuring guest appearances from Rick Ross, Dreezy, PnB Rock, Lil Durk, Boosie Badazz and YFN Trae Pound. The EP debuted at number 27 on the Billboard 200. The lead single from the project, "Everyday We Lit" featuring PnB Rock, has peaked at number 33 on the Billboard Hot 100.

On March 9, 2018, Lucci released his first studio album entitled Ray Ray From Summerhill. The album features guest appearances from a plethora of acts such as frequent collaborators Dreezy, Meek Mill and YFN Trae Pound.

On February 14, 2020, Lucci released his single "Wet (She Got That...)", which received a remix featuring Mulatto on September 18, 2020. "Wet" served as the lead single from Lucci's mixtape Wish Me Well 3, released in December 2020.

== Personal life ==
In 2018 and 2020, Bennett was in a publicized on-again, off-again relationship with the daughter of Lil Wayne, Reginae Carter. He has fathered four children with two different mothers.

== Other ventures ==
In 2017, Lucci along with artist Jacquees were chosen to star in Sean John's holiday 2017 and spring 2018 campaigns.

== Legal issues ==
On March 18, 2018, Anthony Cam aka Rackboy Cam, a New Jersey–based rapper filed a complaint in U.S. District Court in Georgia against Bennett, PnB Rock, music producer June James (The Jenius) and Think It's a Game Records (T.I.G.) with allegations of copyright infringement of the plaintiff's 2016 song, "Everything Be Lit" in Bennett's 2017 song, "Everyday We Lit". In 2019, Bennett and T.I.G. and the plaintiff reached a settlement for an undisclosed amount. On March 2, 2021, Senior U.S. District Court Judge Charles Pannell issued a $1.7 million default judgement in favor of the plaintiff after PnB Rock and James did not respond to the lawsuit. On September 6, 2022 the Eleventh Circuit vacated the judgement citing that plaintiff failed to properly serve James with the amended complaint plaintiff filed one month after the original. The case was sent back to the lower court.

On January 12, 2021, warrants for Bennett's arrest were issued in Atlanta, Georgia, charging him with a December 2020 shooting that left a 28-year-old man dead and another man wounded, Atlanta Police Department (APD) told the press. In addition to being a suspect in the shooting, the APD charged Bennett with "aggravated assault and participation in criminal street gang activity." He was arrested on January 13, 2021, after turning himself in to police. Bennett was released on house arrest after posting a $500,000 bond on February 8, 2021.

In May 2021, Bennett was among twelve people charged in a 105-count RICO indictment filed by Fulton County District Attorney Fani Willis. Bennett faced charges including racketeering, violating the state's anti-gang law, and possession of a firearm during the commission of a felony. The Atlanta Police Department stated that Bennett was a member of a faction of the Bloods. An attorney for Bennett argued that the rapper was innocent of all charges against him. On June 1, 2021, a Fulton County judge denied Bennett bond. He accepted a plea bargain and pleaded guilty on January 23, 2024. He was sentenced to ten years in prison and ten years of probation. His jail time was counted as time served. On January 31, 2025, Bennett was released from prison.

== Artistry ==
Discussing how he developed his sing-song style in an interview with Noisey, Lucci said; "Growing up, I always had this high-pitched voice. I couldn't ever sing, you feel me, but I had a little high-pitched voice when I talked loud. I used to listen to Ja Rule. I knew how to rap, and I used to write my verses. And if it don't sound right when I rap it, I sing it. And it'd sound better. I used to let all my friends hear it, and they were like, 'I like that.' I just ran with it. If I can't rap it, I sing it."

== Discography ==
Studio albums

- Ray Ray from Summerhill (2018)
- Already Legend (2025)
- Everything I Said I Am / Everything She Said She Is (2026)
