= Cougar Fight Song (University of Houston) =

Fight song of the University of Houston

The "Cougar Fight Song" is the official college fight song of the University of Houston (UH). It was written by Marion Ford with lyrics by Forest Fountain, both UH students. It is typically performed by the Spirit of Houston.

The "Cougar Fight Song" was popularized by Ed Gerlach, a UH music professor, and his orchestra in the 1950s. In 2002, Norm Maves, Jr. of The Oregonian named the song as the 7th best college fight song in America.

== Lyrics ==
Cougars fight for dear old U of H
For our Alma Mater cheer.
Fight for Houston University
For victory is near.
When the going gets so rough and tough
We never worry cause we got the stuff.
So fight, fight, fight for red and white
And we will go to victory.
