= Trouble (rapper) =

American rapper (1987–2022)

Background information
- Also known as: Skoob
- Born: Mariel Semonte Orr; November 4, 1987; Atlanta, Georgia, U.S.
- Died: June 5, 2022 (aged 34) Rockdale County, Georgia, U.S.
- Genres: Southern hip-hop; trap
- Occupations: Rapper; songwriter
- Years active: 2008–2022
- Labels: Def Jam; EarDrummer; Interscope; Duct Tape

Mariel Semonte Orr (November 4, 1987 – June 5, 2022), known professionally as Trouble, was an American rapper from Atlanta, Georgia. He self-released eight mixtapes before guest appearing alongside Migos on YFN Lucci's 2016 single "Key to the Streets," which received platinum certification by the Recording Industry Association of America (RIAA). The following year, he signed with Mike Will Made It's EarDrummer Records, an imprint of Interscope Records to release his debut studio album Edgewood (2018), which entered the Billboard 200 and was supported by the single "Bring It Back" (with Drake). He signed a joint venture with Def Jam Recordings to release his second album Thug Luv (2020), which failed to chart.

He was shot and killed at the age of 34 on June 5, 2022 during a home invasion.

== Early life ==
Mariel Semonte Orr was born on November 4, 1987, in Atlanta, Georgia. He started rapping at the age of 14.

== Career ==
In April 2011, Trouble released his debut mixtape December 17th, which featured on Complex's "25 Best Mixtapes of 2011". The mixtape included the song "Bussin'", which featured Yo Gotti, Waka Flocka Flame, and Trae tha Truth on the remix. In August 2011, Complex included Trouble in its "15 New Rappers To Watch Out For" list. In 2013, he was included in XXL magazine's "15 Atlanta Rappers You Should Know" list.

In 2015, Trouble appeared on Lupe Fiasco's album Tetsuo & Youth, along with Glasses Malone, Trae tha Truth, Billy Blue, Buk, and Fam-Lay in the track "Chopper".

In 2016, Trouble appeared on rapper YFN Lucci's single "Key to the Streets", which peaked at number 70 on the Billboard Hot 100.

In March 2016, Trouble and labelmate Veli Sosa filmed a music video in North Carolina titled "Straight Out" from his 2016 mixtape Skoobzilla and "Like A" which featured ReeseDaGreat, who is also signed to DTE. The videos were filmed by director LookImHD and guest starred Big Bank Black as a cameo in the videos, a snippet of which was later posted on Instagram.

In 2017, Trouble signed a record deal with Mike Will Made It's record label, Ear Drummer Records and Interscope Records.

== Death ==
On June 5, 2022, Orr was shot during a home invasion at the Rockdale County apartment of a female companion. He was transported to a hospital, where he died. The suspect, Jamichael Jones, did not know Orr and was involved in a domestic dispute with the woman.

== Discography ==
=== Studio albums ===
Title	Album details	Peak chart positions	
Title	Album details	US	US Heat.
Edgewood	Released: March 23, 2018; Label: Interscope, EarDrummers; Format: Digital download, streaming	130	—
Thug Luv	Released: May 2, 2020; Label: Def Jam, EarDrummers; Format: Digital download, streaming	—	16

=== Mixtapes ===
- December 17th (2011)
- Green Light (2011)
- 431 Days (2012)
- The Return of December 17th (2013)
- All on Me (2014)
- #ZayDidIt (2015)
- Skoob Fresh (2015)
- Skoobzilla (2016)
- Year in 2016 (2017)

== See also ==
- List of murdered hip hop musicians
