= Key to the Streets =

Single by YFN Lucci featuring Migos and Trouble

from the album Wish Me Well 2
- Released: February 23, 2016
- Recorded: 2016
- Genre: Hip hop; trap
- Length: 4:41
- Label: T.I.G.; Empire
- Songwriters: Rayshawn Bennett; Mariel Orr; June James; Quavious Marshall; Kirsnick Ball
- Producer: James

YFN Lucci singles chronology
"Room Full of Bitchez" (2015)	"Key to the Streets" (2016)	"Everyday We Lit" (2016)

Migos singles chronology
"WOA" (2016)	"Key to the Streets" (2016)	"Say Sum" (2016)

Trouble singles chronology
"Ready" (2015)	"Key to the Streets" (2016)

Music video
- "Key to the Streets" on YouTube

"Key to the Streets" is a song by American rapper YFN Lucci. It was released on February 23, 2016, as the third single from his mixtape Wish Me Well 2. The song features Quavo and Takeoff from hip hop trio Migos, as well as rapper Trouble. "Key to the Streets" marked Lucci's first and Trouble's only entry on the Billboard Hot 100, peaking at number 70, while receiving platinum certification by the Recording Industry Association of America. The song was produced by Texas-based producer June James.

== Critical reception ==
XXL magazine named "Key to the Streets" as one of 50 best hip-hop songs of 2016. Vibe magazine ranked it at number 56 on its The 60 Best Songs Of 2016 list.

== Music video ==
On June 24, 2016, the music video for "Key to the Streets" was released on Lucci's Vevo channel.

== Remixes ==
The official remix of the song, featuring rappers 2 Chainz, Lil Wayne and Quavo, premiered on September 14, 2016. It was released for digital download on iTunes on September 16. In November 2016, rapper Ace Hood released his own remix of the song, which appeared on his Body Bag 4 mixtape. In January 2017, rapper Fabolous and singer Trey Songz released a collaborative mixtape titled Trappy New Years, which included their remix version of "Key to the Streets".

== Charts ==
=== Weekly charts ===
Chart (2016)	Peak position
US Billboard Hot 100	70
US Hot R&B/Hip-Hop Songs (Billboard)	27

=== Year-end charts ===
Chart (2016)	Position
US Hot R&B/Hip-Hop Songs (Billboard)	93

== Certifications ==
Region	Certification	Certified units/sales
United States (RIAA)	Platinum	1,000,000^{‡}
^{‡} Sales+streaming figures based on certification alone.
