= List of Fast & Furious characters =

Fast & Furious (also known as The Fast and the Furious) is an American action film series centered on street racing, heists, spies, and family.

The following is a list of characters from the film franchise.

== Cast ==
=== Feature films ===
List indicators

This section includes characters who will appear or have appeared in the feature films.

- An empty grey cell indicates the character was not in the film, or that the character's official presence has not yet been confirmed.
- ^{A} indicates an appearance through archival footage or audio.
- ^{C} indicates a cameo role.
- ^{E} indicates an appearance not included in the theatrical cut.
- ^{P} indicates an appearance in onscreen photographs.
- ^{U} indicates an uncredited appearance.
- ^{V} indicates a voice-only role.
- ^{Y} indicates a younger version of the character.

Overview of characters in the Fast & Furious feature films
Character	The Fast and the Furious 2001	2 Fast 2 Furious 2003	The Fast and the Furious: Tokyo Drift 2006	Fast & Furious 2009	Fast Five 2011	Fast & Furious 6 2013	Furious 7 2015	The Fate of the Furious 2017	Hobbs & Shaw 2019	F9 2021	Fast X 2023
Brian O'Conner	Paul Walker	Paul Walker		Paul Walker	Paul Walker	Paul Walker	Paul Walker (Note: During the production of Furious 7, Paul Walker died in a single-vehicle accident on November 30, 2013. As a result, his character Brian O'Conner was written out as retired. Walker's brothers, Caleb and Cody, were used among others as stand-ins to complete his remaining scenes, and the film is dedicated to him.)	Paul Walker^{P}			Paul Walker^{A}
Dominic Toretto	Vin Diesel		Vin Diesel^{U}^{C}	Vin Diesel	Vin Diesel	Vin Diesel	Vin Diesel	Vin Diesel		Vin Diesel Vincent Sinclair^{Y} Vinnie Bennett^{Y}	Vin Diesel
Letty Ortiz	Michelle Rodriguez			Michelle Rodriguez	Michelle Rodriguez^{P}	Michelle Rodriguez	Michelle Rodriguez	Michelle Rodriguez		Michelle Rodriguez Azia Dinea Hale^{Y}	Michelle Rodriguez
Mia Toretto	Jordana Brewster			Jordana Brewster	Jordana Brewster	Jordana Brewster	Jordana Brewster	Jordana Brewster^{P}		Jordana Brewster Siena Agudong^{Y}	Jordana Brewster
Johnny Tran	Rick Yune										
Jesse	Chad Lindberg									Igby Rigney^{Y}	
Leon	Johnny Strong										
Sergeant Tanner	Ted Levine										
Agent Bilkins	Thom Barry	Thom Barry									
Hector	Noel Gugliemi						Noel Gugliemi^{C}				
Lance Nguyen	Reggie Lee										
Vince	Matt Schulze				Matt Schulze					Karson Kern^{Y}	
Roman Pearce		Tyrese Gibson			Tyrese Gibson	Tyrese Gibson	Tyrese Gibson	Tyrese Gibson		Tyrese Gibson	Tyrese Gibson
Tej Parker		Ludacris			Ludacris	Ludacris	Ludacris	Ludacris		Ludacris	Ludacris
Monica Fuentes		Eva Mendes			Eva Mendes^{U}^{C}						Eva Mendes^{P}
Carter Verone		Cole Hauser									
Agent Markham		James Remar									
Enrique		Mo Gallini									
Slap Jack		Michael Ealy					Michael Ealy^{A}				
Jimmy		MC Jin									
Orange Julius		Amaury Nolasco					Amaury Nolasco^{A}				
Suki		Devon Aoki					Devon Aoki^{A}				Devon Aoki^{P}
Detective Whitworth		Mark Boone Junior									
Sean Boswell			Lucas Black				Lucas Black^{C}			Lucas Black	Lucas Black^{P}
Twinkie			Bow Wow				Bow Wow^{A}			Bow Wow	
Han Lue			Sung Kang	Sung Kang	Sung Kang	Sung Kang	Sung Kang^{A}			Sung Kang	Sung Kang
Major Boswell			Brian Goodman								
Ms. Boswell			Lynda Boyd								
Neela Ezar			Nathalie Kelley				Nathalie Kelley^{A}				
Earl Hu			Jason Tobin							Jason Tobin	
Clay			Zachery Ty Bryan								
Kamata			Sonny Chiba								
Morimoto			Leonardo Nam								
Reiko			Keiko Kitagawa								
Takashi Drift King			Brian Tee								
Arturo Braga Ramon Campos				John Ortiz		John Ortiz^{C}					
Fenix Calderon				Laz Alonso		Laz Alonso^{U}^{C}					
Malik Herzon				Neil Brown Jr.							
Dwight Mueller				Greg Cipes							
Tego Leo				Tego Calderón	Tego Calderón			Tego Calderón^{C}		Cered^{Y}	Tego Calderón^{A}
Rico Santos				Don Omar	Don Omar			Don Omar^{C}		Ozuna^{Y} Don Omar^{C}	Don Omar^{A}
David Park				Ron Yuan							
Michael Stasiak				Shea Whigham		Shea Whigham^{C}				Shea Whigham^{C}	
Sophie Trinh				Liza Lapira							
Gisele Yashar				Gal Gadot	Gal Gadot	Gal Gadot	Gal Gadot^{E}^{P}			Gal Gadot^{A}	Gal Gadot^{U}^{C}
Luke Hobbs					Dwayne Johnson	Dwayne Johnson	Dwayne Johnson	Dwayne Johnson	Dwayne Johnson		Dwayne Johnson^{U}^{C}
Elena Neves					Elsa Pataky	Elsa Pataky	Elsa Pataky	Elsa Pataky			Elsa Pataky^{A}^{P}
Hernan Reyes					Joaquim de Almeida						Joaquim de Almeida
Zizi					Michael Irby						Michael Irby^{A}
Diogo					Luis Da Silva Jr						Luis Da Silva Jr
Owen Shaw						Luke Evans	Luke Evans^{C}	Luke Evans^{C}	Harry Hickles^{Y}		
Riley Hicks						Gina Carano					
Adolfson						Benjamin Davies					
Ivory						David Ajala					
Jah						Joe Taslim					
Klaus						Kim Kold					
Vegh						Clara Paget					
Deckard Shaw						Jason Statham^{U}^{C}	Jason Statham	Jason Statham	Jason Statham Joshua Coombes^{Y}	Jason Statham^{U}^{C}	Jason Statham
Mose Jakande							Djimon Hounsou	Djimon Hounsou^{P}			
Kiet							Tony Jaa				
Kara							Ronda Rousey				
Mr. Nobody							Kurt Russell	Kurt Russell		Kurt Russell	Kurt Russell^{P}
Megan Ramsey							Nathalie Emmanuel	Nathalie Emmanuel		Nathalie Emmanuel	Nathalie Emmanuel
Samantha Hobbs							Eden Estrella	Eden Estrella	Eliana Su'a		
Mando							Romeo Santos^{C}				
Safar							Ali Fazal^{C}				
Sheppard							John Brotherton				
Cipher								Charlize Theron		Charlize Theron	Charlize Theron
Little Nobody								Scott Eastwood			Scott Eastwood
Connor Rhodes								Kristofer Hivju			Kristofer Hivju^{A}
Brian "Little B" Marcos								Carlos De La Hoz		Isaac & Immanuel Holdane	Leo Abelo Perry
Magdalene "Queenie" Shaw								Helen Mirren^{C}	Helen Mirren	Helen Mirren	Helen Mirren
Brixton Lore									Idris Elba		
Hattie Shaw									Vanessa Kirby Meesha Garbett^{Y}		
Margarita Madame M									Eiza González		
Jonah Hobbs									Cliff Curtis		
Mateo Hobbs									Roman Reigns		
Professor Andreiko									Eddie Marsan		
Kal Hobbs									John Tui		
Timo Hobbs									Josh Mauga		
Air Marshal Dinkley									Kevin Hart^{U}^{C}		
Sefina Hobbs									Lori Pelenise Tuisano		
Victor Locke									Ryan Reynolds^{U}^{C}		
Agent Loeb									Rob Delaney		
Jakob Toretto										John Cena Finn Cole^{Y}	John Cena
Buddy										Michael Rooker	Michael Rooker^{P}
Otto										Thue Ersted Rasmussen	
Elle										Anna Sawai Juju Zhang^{Y}	Anna Sawai^{P}
Leysa										Cardi B	
Kenny Linder										Jim Parrack	
Jack Toretto										J. D. Pardo	
Dante Reyes											Jason Momoa
Agent Aimes											Alan Ritchson
Isabel Neves											Daniela Melchior
Tess											Brie Larson
Abuelita Toretto											Rita Moreno
Bowie											Pete Davidson^{C}

=== Short films ===
List indicator

This section includes characters who will appear or have appeared in the short films.

- An empty grey cell indicates the character was not in the film, or that the character's official presence has not yet been confirmed.

Characters in Fast & Furious short films
Character	The Turbo Charged Prelude for 2 Fast 2 Furious 2003	Los Bandoleros 2009
Brian O'Conner	Paul Walker	
Dominic Toretto	Vin Diesel^{A}	Vin Diesel
Letty Ortiz		Michelle Rodriguez
Han Lue		Sung Kang
Tego Leo		Tego Calderón
Rico Santos		Don Omar

== Main characters ==
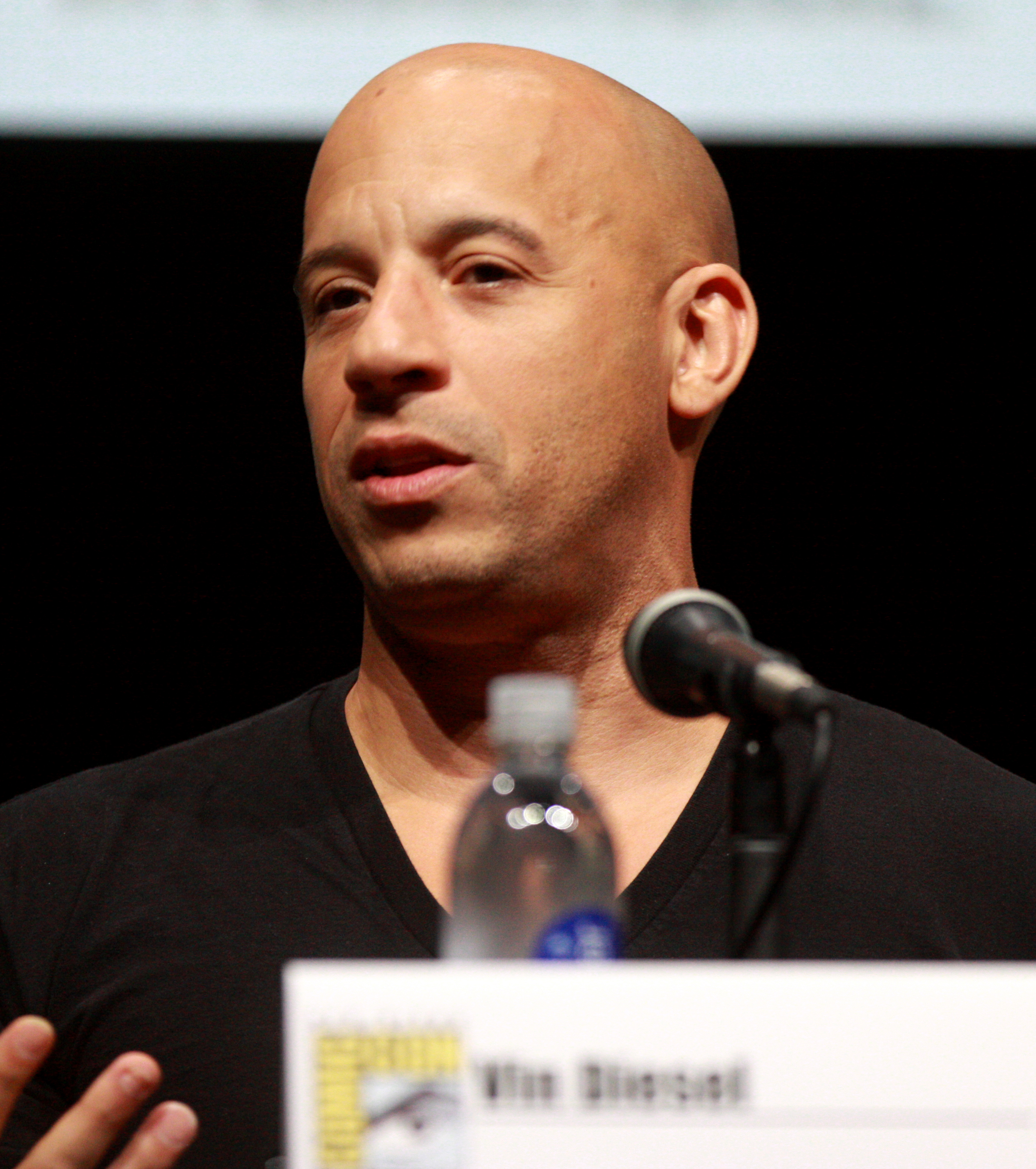
Vin Diesel

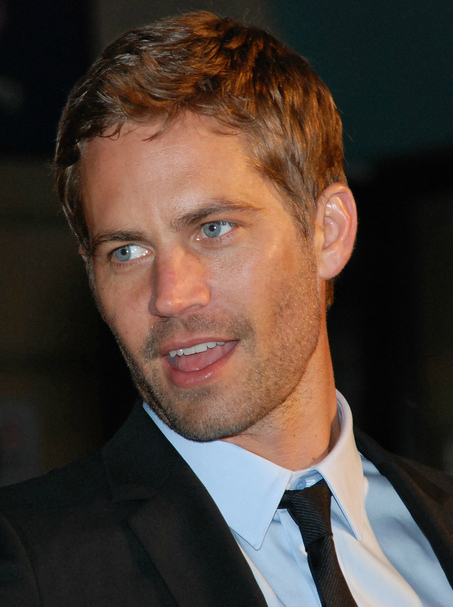
Paul Walker

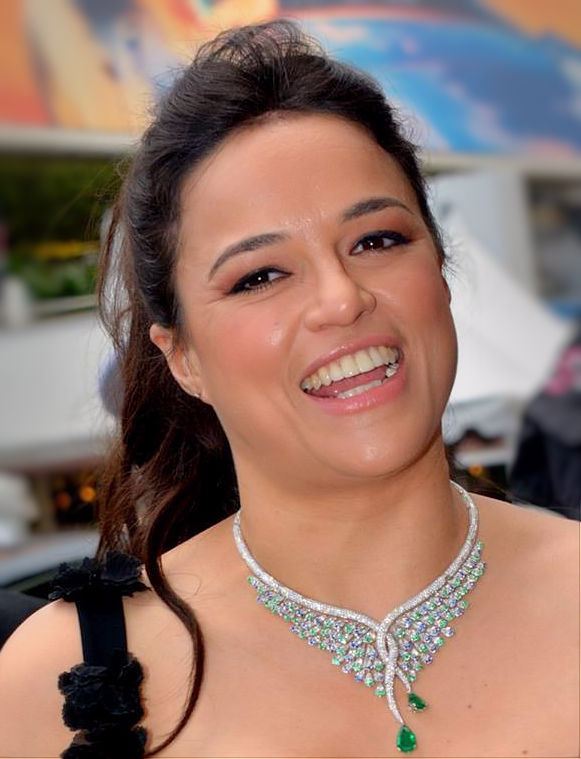
Michelle Rodriguez

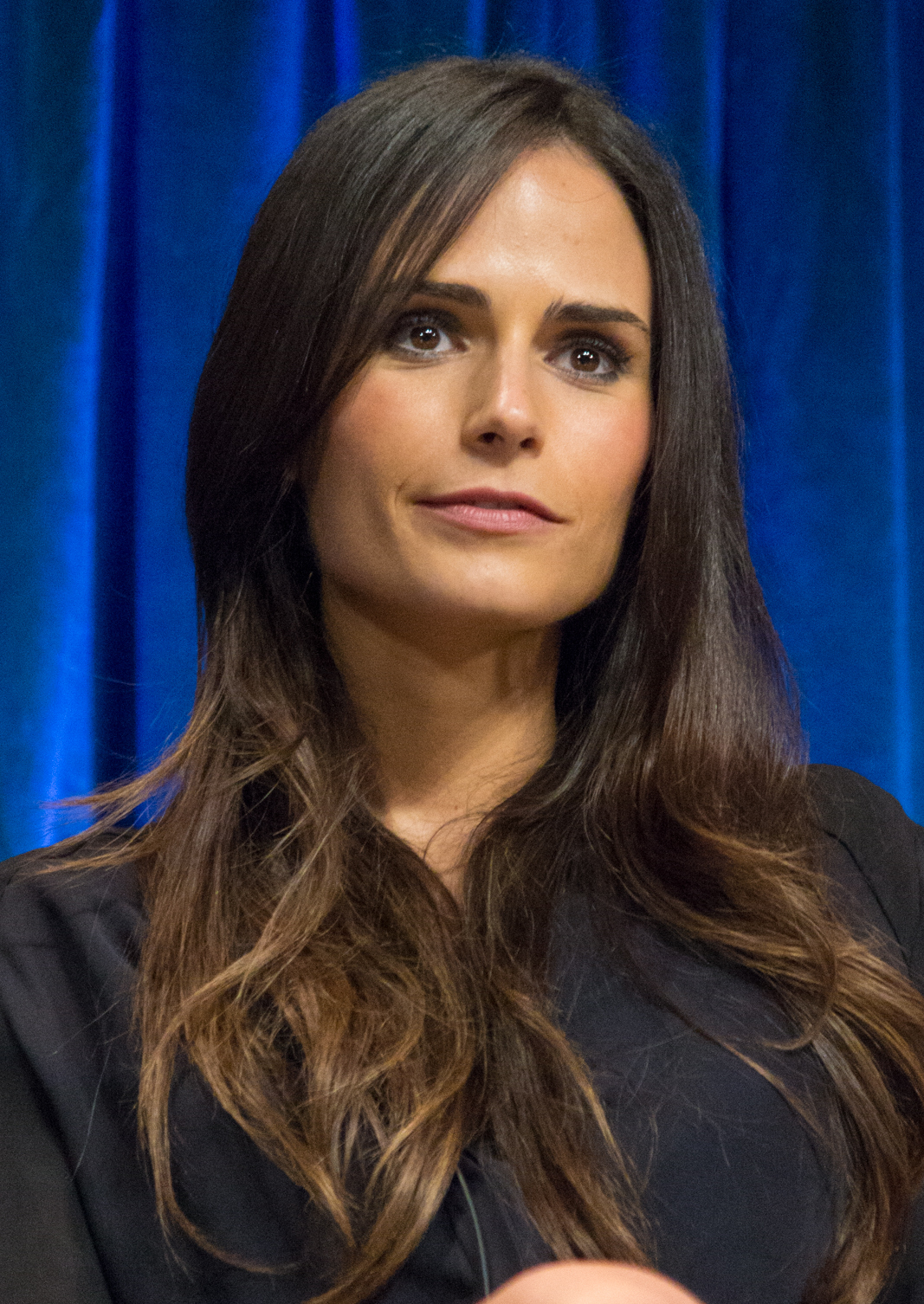
Jordana Brewster

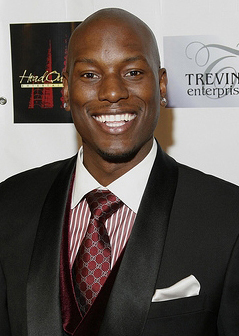
Tyrese Gibson

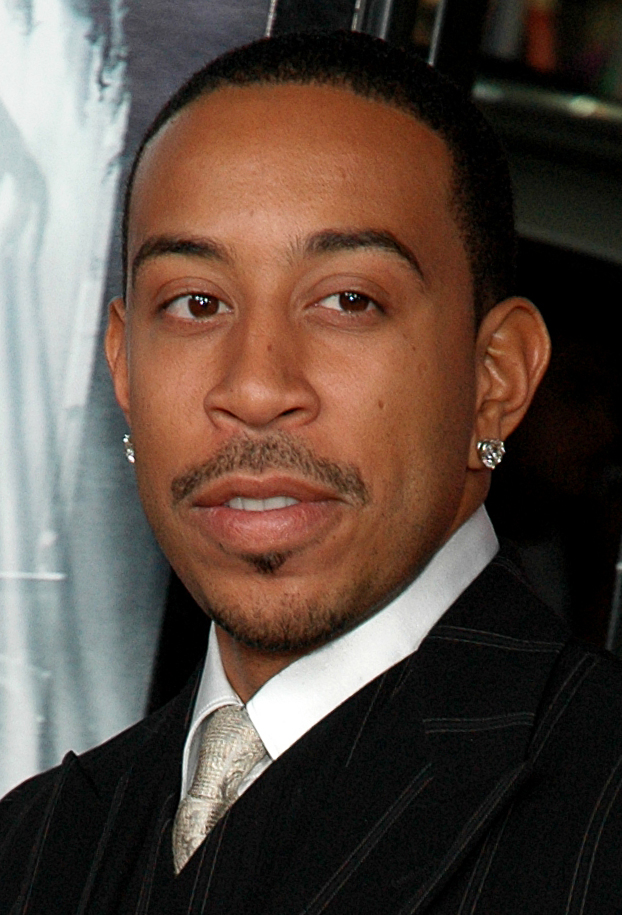
Ludacris

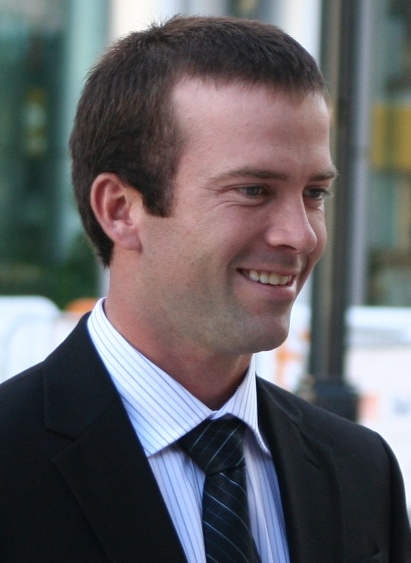
Lucas Black

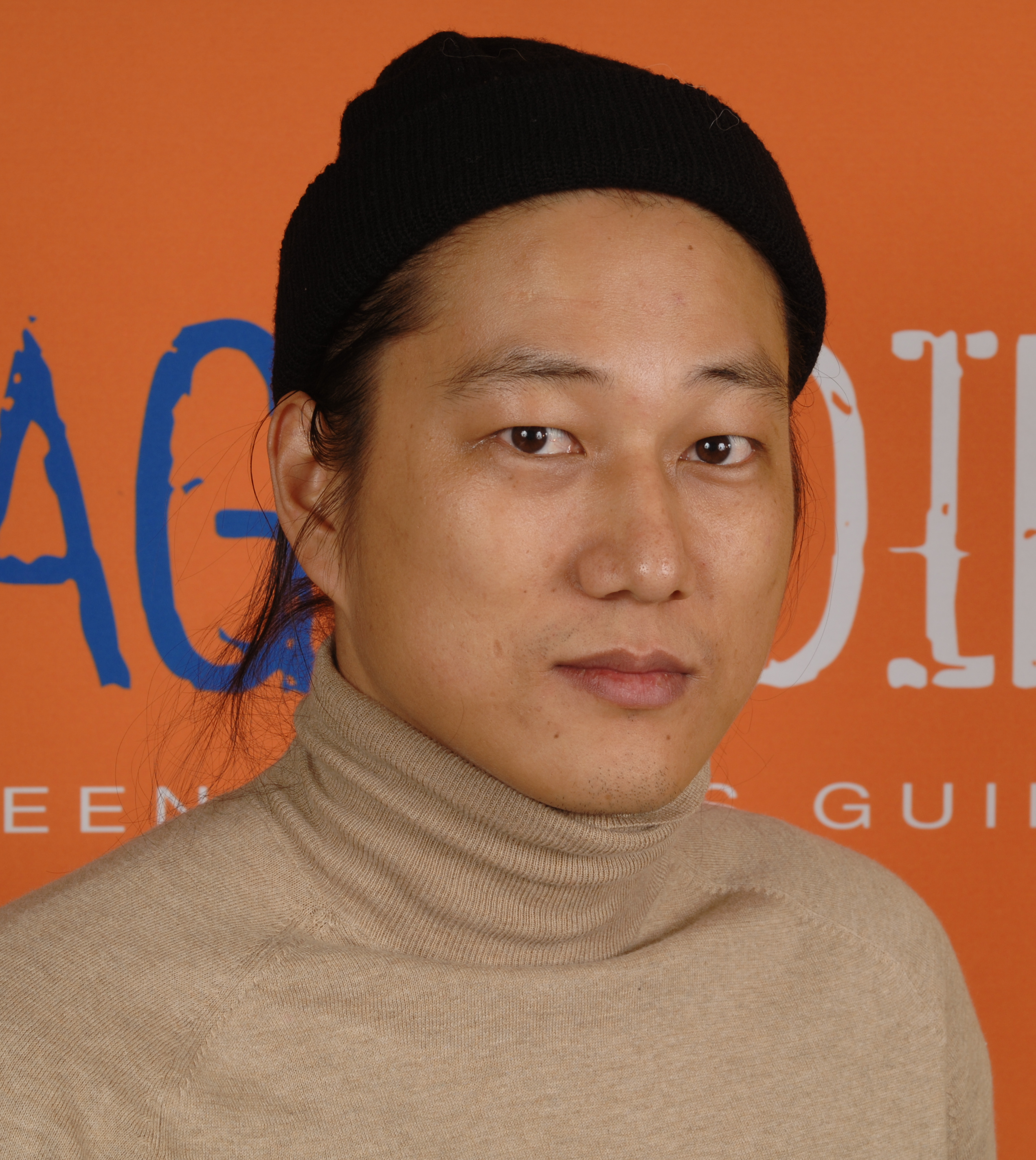
Sung Kang

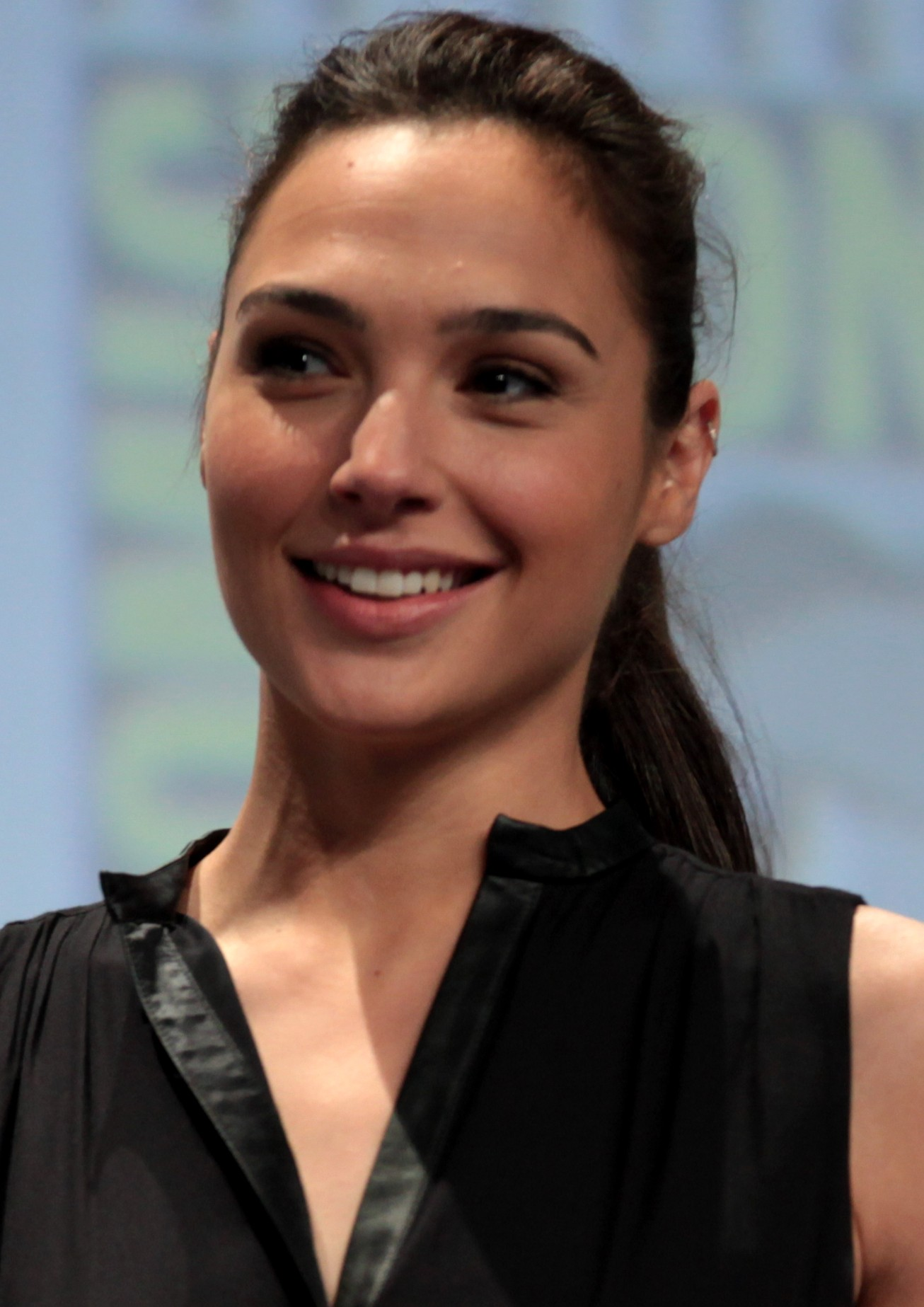
Gal Gadot

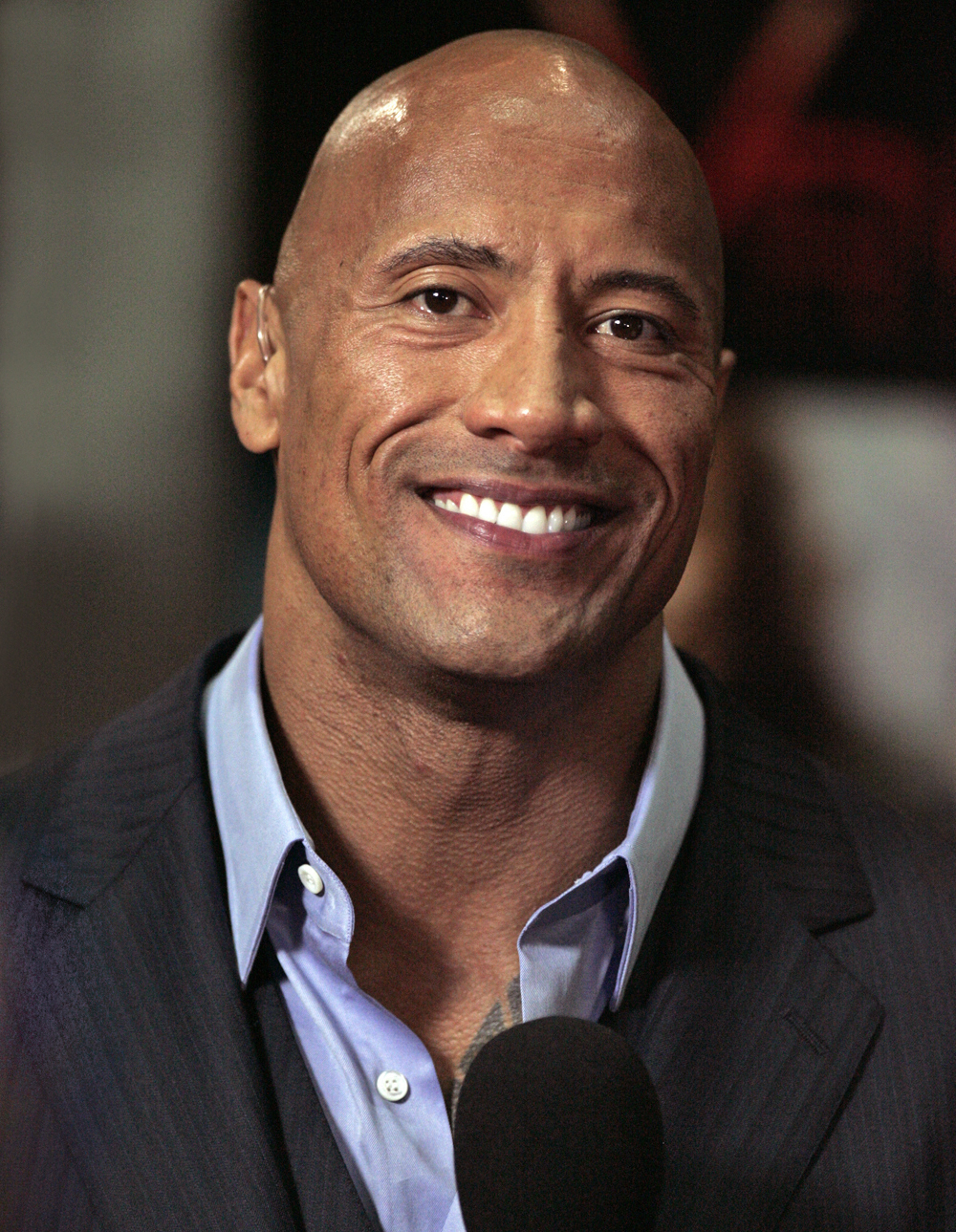
Dwayne Johnson

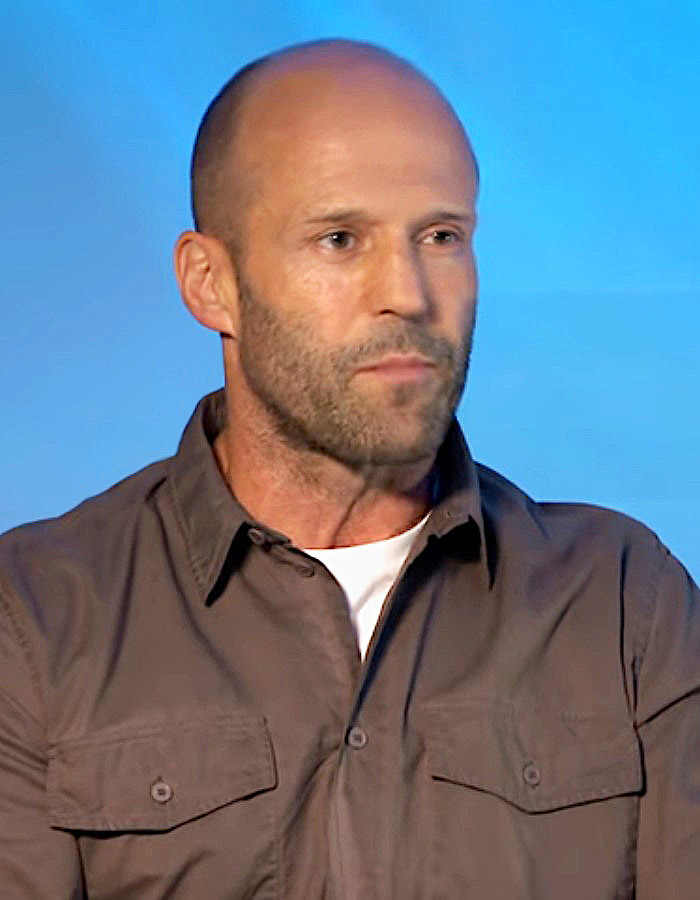
Jason Statham

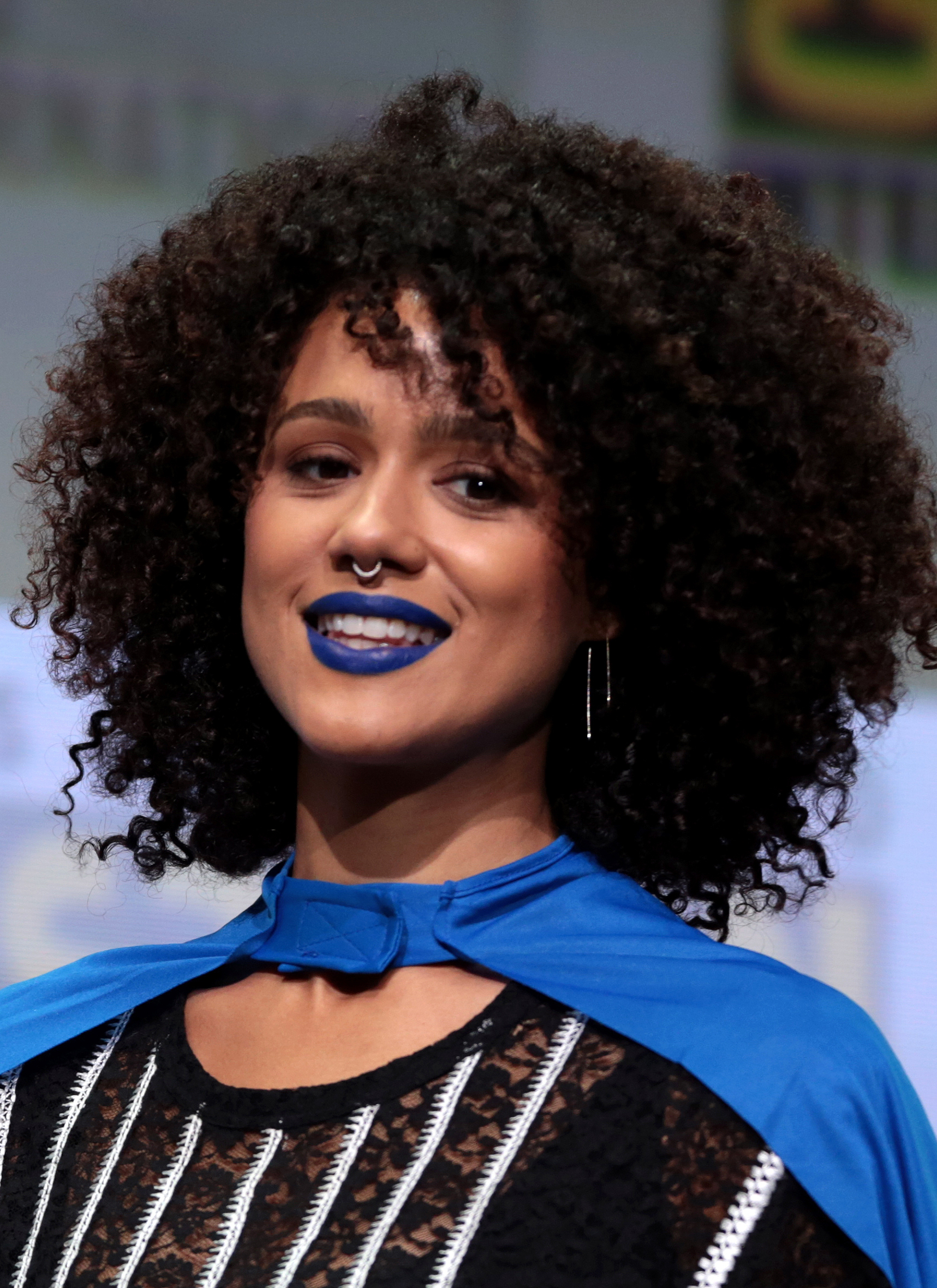
Nathalie Emmanuel

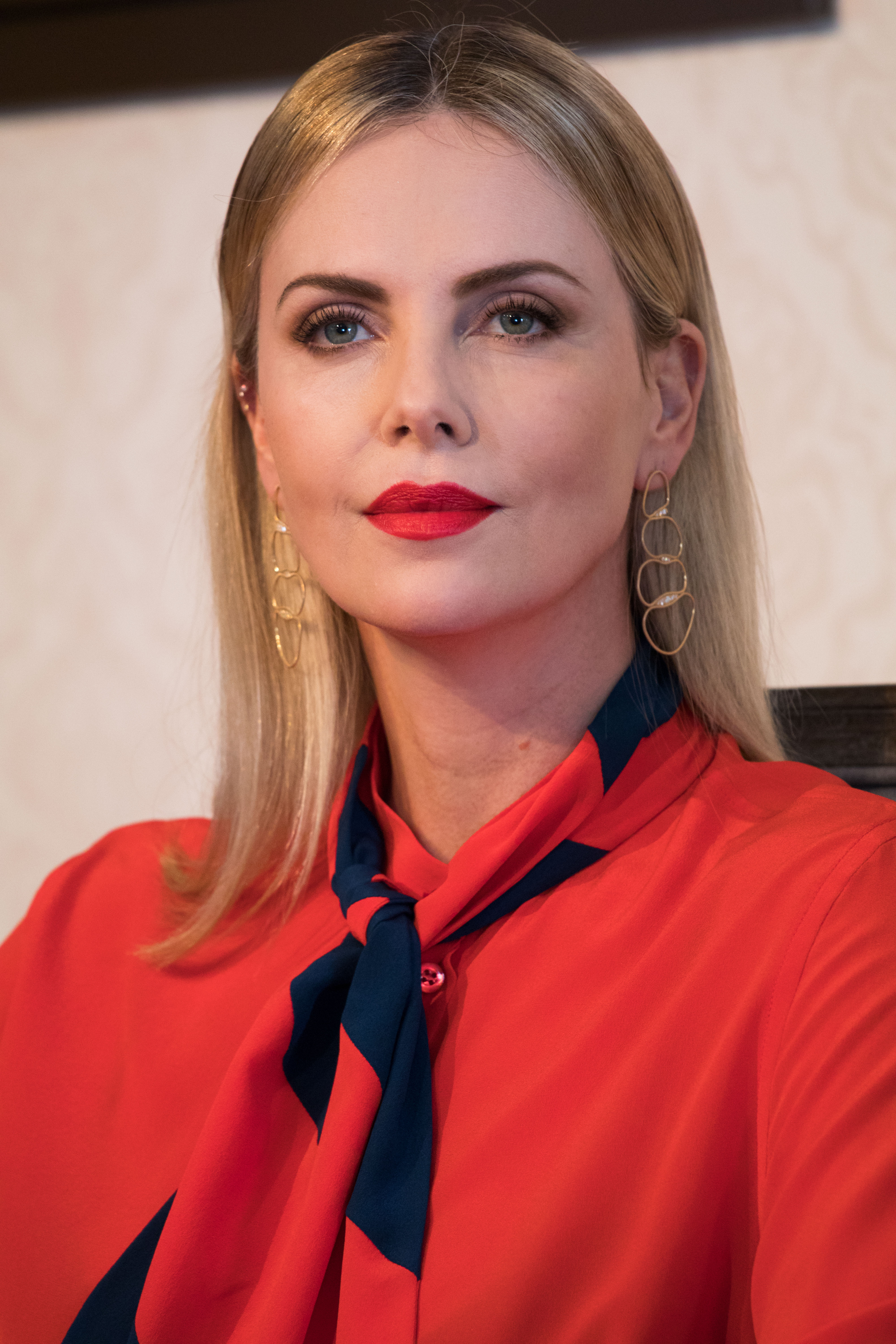
Charlize Theron

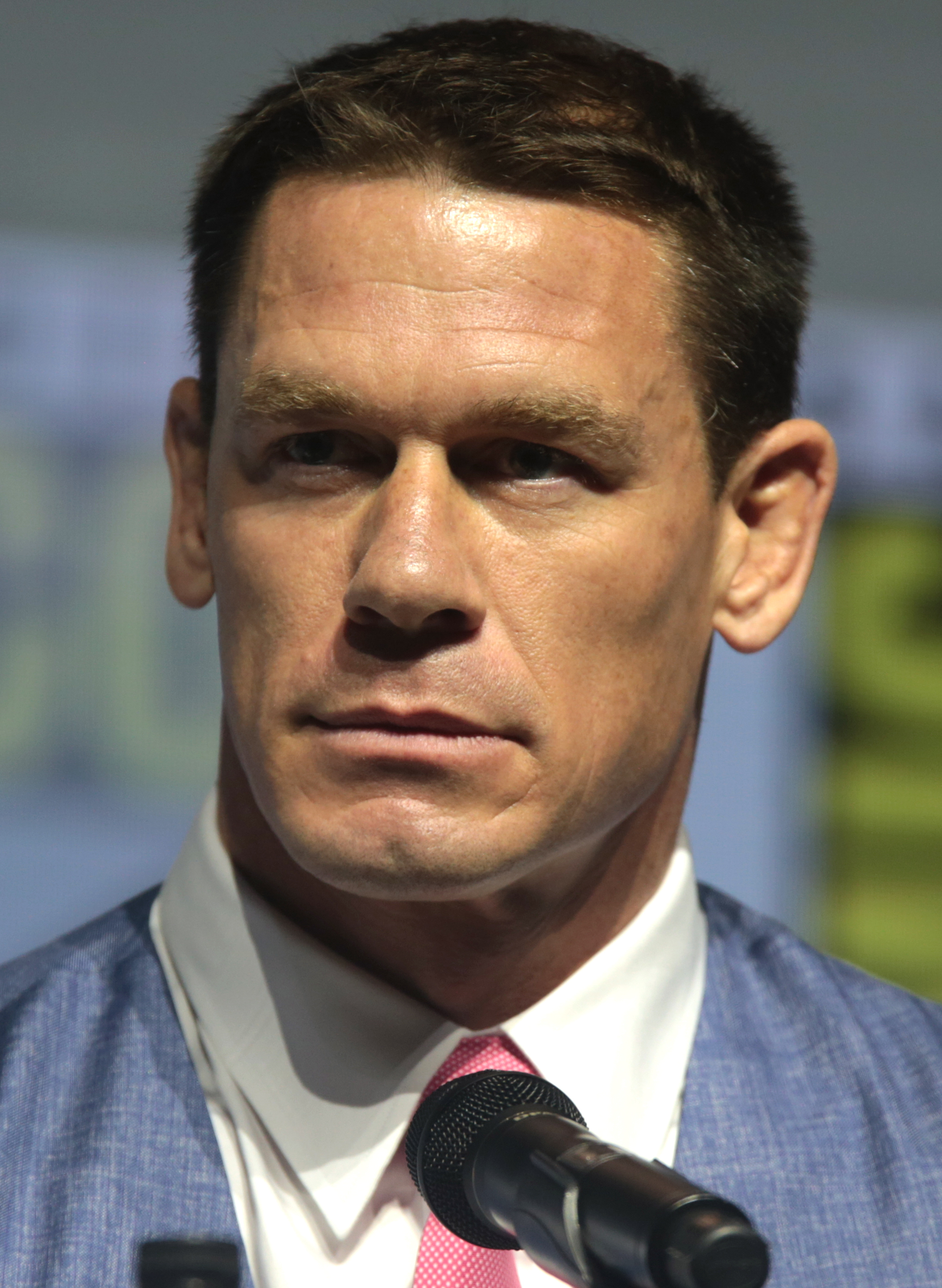
John Cena

Diesel, Walker, Rodriguez, Brewster, Gibson, Ludacris, Kang, Gadot, Johnson, Statham, Emmanuel, Theron, and Cena were or are part of the main cast of the franchise, while Black stars in Tokyo Drift. Johnson and Statham also headline their own film.

=== Dominic Toretto ===
Dominic "Dom" Toretto, played by Vin Diesel, appears in most of the films in the series. An elite street racer, auto mechanic, and an ex-convict, Dominic is the brother of Jakob and Mia, son of Jack, husband of Letty Ortiz, cousin of Tony and Fernando, uncle of Jack and Olivia O'Conner, and father of Brian Marcos Toretto.

In The Fast and the Furious, Dom leads a double life in Los Angeles with his sister Mia, his girlfriend Letty, best friend Vince, and teammates Leon and Jesse. During the day, he tunes performance vehicles out of the auto shop behind his family's grocery store (which is run by Mia). At night, Dom and his team participate in illegal street racing in and around downtown LA. When they are not racing or working in the garage, the team performs precision hijackings out of three black high-performance Honda Civics, targeting container semi-trucks on LA freeways transporting electronic merchandise valued at hundreds of thousands or millions of dollars. LAPD police officer Brian O'Connor infiltrates the group while working undercover, using the alias of Brian Spilner and the guise of a new racer eager to participate in high-stakes matches. On his first night, he challenges Dom by buying into a race using the pink slip for his Mitsubishi Eclipse (later said to be valued at $80,000). Brian ultimately loses the race, and a subsequent run-in with Dom's rival Johnny Tran leads to the Eclipse's destruction. The result places Brian in debt to Dom for an equally capable vehicle that can run a quarter-mile in ten seconds. Over the following weeks and months, and much to the chagrin of Vince, Brian works closely with Dom and his team to restore a Toyota Supra in time to participate in Race Wars, a legal racing event held in the desert outside of LA that attracts hundreds of participants. Dom ultimately discovers Brian's identity when Brian is forced to expose himself to save Vince after their final daytime hijacking goes awry. Vince, having sustained physical trauma from the endeavor, is bleeding out, forcing Brian to call for medevac and announce himself as an LAPD officer. This deception infuriates Dom, who immediately departs with Mia, Leon and Letty. By the time Vince is loaded onto the medevac, Dom is speeding away in the last remaining Civic with the remnants of Dom's team. Brian catches up to Dom at his home in LA; Leon and Letty having already fled to avoid arrest. When Tran and his cousin Lance attempt a drive-by shooting on dirt bikes as revenge for an earlier dispute, Brian and Dom pursue them in separate cars. Dom, in his late father's 1970 Dodge Charger, manages to incapacitate Lance while Brian pursues Tran in his Supra and kills him after shooting him in the side, causing him to crash at high speed on his motorcycle. Dom then challenges Brian to a race, pitting the Charger vs. the Supra on a quarter-mile strip with a railroad crossing as the finish line. The two engage in the high-speed drag race ultimately against an oncoming train. Barely surviving the train, Dom immediately collides with a semi-truck pulling out of a side street causing the Charger to flip multiple times. Brian, rushing to his aid, understands Dom's plight and fulfilling his commitment to give Dom a ten-second car, hands over the keys to his Supra. Dom departs as the sound of police sirens approaches, leaving Brian to answer for his failure. In a post-credits scene, Dom is seen driving a Chevrolet Chevelle in Baja California, having eluded capture.

Although Dom is not in 2 Fast 2 Furious, he is referred to a couple of times.

In Los Bandoleros, Dom remains on the run from the law in the Dominican Republic, putting together a new team to pull off heists: Han, Cara, Tego Leo, and Rico Santos. After breaking Tego out of prison, Letty returns and rekindles her romance with Dom. Sometime after this (as revealed in Furious 7), Dom and Letty marry.

In Fast & Furious, Dominic and his team pull off another heist in the Dominican Republic but have become so infamous with the law that doing so puts them at risk. Dom decides to disband the team, allowing them to move on. Despite Letty wanting to remain with him, Dom leaves in order to protect her. But months later, he is forced to return to the United States upon learning of Letty's apparent death. He reunites with Brian and teams up with him to stop drug lord Arturo Braga in order to avenge Letty. By the end, Dom gives himself up to the law to face the consequences of his actions but the transport taking him to prison is intercepted by Brian, Mia, Tego, and Rico to free him.

In Fast Five, Dominic, Brian, and Mia are now on the run, finding refuge in Rio de Janeiro. In order to escape the authorities and from drug kingpin Hernan Reyes, their newest enemy, they plot to steal Reyes's money in an attempt to buy their freedom. During a talk with Brian, Dominic recalls his happy childhood with his father and Mia. Dominic, Brian, and Mia put together new team to pull off a heist, made of Roman, Tej, Gisele, Han, Rico, and Tego. They also try to evade capture by the DSS agent Luke Hobbs and Rio police officer Elena Neves. Hobbs and Elena become allies to Dominic after his team saves them from Reyes's men. With the help of his team, Dominic's heist is successful, and goes into hiding with Mia and Brian, while starting a relationship with Elena, who falls in love with him.

In Fast & Furious 6, Dominic lives peacefully with Elena. He is approached by Hobbs, who asks him to help take down Owen Shaw and his rogue team in exchange for their freedom to be granted. Hobbs also reveals that Shaw's second-in-command is an amnesiac but still-alive Letty. With Elena's support, Dominic regroups with his team and tries to talk to Letty to remember him and her former friends. Through numerous actions, he eventually gains Letty's trust, and defeats Shaw. His group is given full pardons from their crimes, and they return to the United States. Elena becomes Hobbs's new partner so that Dominic can be with Letty and start anew. In a post credit scene, he would later get a call with a threatening message from a man related to Owen Shaw, who has apparently killed Han.

In The Fast and the Furious: Tokyo Drift, he makes a cameo appearance at the end of the film as an old friend of Han's, who has been apparently killed in a car crash, challenging the new Drift King, Sean Boswell, to a drift race.

In Furious 7, Dominic and his team returns to LA as free people leading their own personal lives until they are recruited by mysterious government agent Mr Nobody to rescue Ramsey, a hacker with a device known as God's Eye which is capable to locate anyone on Earth, who has been captured by mercenary and terrorist Mose Jakande. Dom and his crew save Ramsey from Jakande and his militants. Retreating back to LA after Mr. Nobody is injured and claims for medical aid, Dom and his crew face off Jakande and his forces in a lengthy and violent battle, ending with Jakande and his entire team killed and dead. After Jakande's death, Dom bids an emotional farewell to Brian, who is retiring from the fast-paced, dangerous life to be with his son and Mia, who is pregnant with their second child. Letty also retains most of her memories, some of which reveal that years ago Dom and her had gotten married.

In The Fate of the Furious, Dominic is on his honeymoon with Letty, as they never officially had one during their time on the run, and is approached by a new enemy named Cipher, who forces him to work for her and betray his friends and family by holding Elena hostage. He was also forced to help her steal the God's Eye and all the equipment for her plan to start a war. On Cipher's plane, he learns that he and Elena had a son while they were in a relationship. After nearly losing the nuclear warheads to Letty and the team. He watches in horror as Cipher lets her right-hand and second-in-command, Connor Rhodes, kill Elena. In desperate need of outside help, he makes a deal with Deckard Shaw's mother to have Owen rescued and faking Deckard's death, in return for her two sons to rescue his child from Cipher. Once Deckard rescues his son, Dom turns on Cipher and kills Rhodes, avenging Elena's death before helping his team stop her plans. He makes peace with Deckard and names his son Brian after his friend and brother-in-law Brian O'Conner.

In F9, Dominic, Letty and little Brian are living off the grid when he and his crew face another threat in the form of his estranged brother, Jakob, an assassin who taken Cipher hostage for information and teaming up with a rogue covert operative named Otto to steal "Project Aries" in order to control all the world's computers and advanced weapons systems. The crew find out that Han is alive, having faked his death with Mr. Nobody in order to protect a girl whose DNA can access Project Aries. Dom faces Jakob, trying to get him to stop what he is doing, and it is revealed that Dom banished him from the family for believing that Jakob was responsible for their father's death due to him tampering his car during a race. Jakob would reveal that their father asked him to do it so that he would throw the race but make his loss look legit in order to pay back the people that he owed money to, only for everything to go wrong when one of the other drivers forced him into the wall. Finally knowing the truth, Dom reconciles with Jakob and the two team up to stop Otto and Cipher, who both double-crossed Jakob after Cipher manipulated Otto into letting her work with him to kill Dom and his crew. Dom later forgives Jakob and helps him escape, similar to how Brian helped him escape.

In Fast X, Dom and the team face the return of Cipher and a new enemy named Dante Reyes.

Dominic is tough and street smart. Although he owned a red Veilside Mazda RX-7 used for street racing and a fleet of black Honda Civic (fifth generation) for his heists in the first film, he is more interested in the American muscle cars, owning a 900 hp Dodge Charger R/T he built with his father, of which he is especially proud. He also owned a Buick GNX, Pontiac Bonneville Convertible, Plymouth Road Runner, Dodge Challenger SRT8 and a Chevrolet Chevelle SS. Dominic Toretto is portrayed by Vin Diesel and the young Dominic is portrayed by Vincent Sinclair Diesel and Vinnie Bennett.

==== Film appearances ====
- The Fast and the Furious
- The Turbo Charged Prelude for 2 Fast 2 Furious (flashback)
- The Fast and the Furious: Tokyo Drift (cameo)
- Fast & Furious
- Los Bandoleros
- Fast Five
- Fast & Furious 6
- Furious 7
- The Fate of the Furious
- F9
- Fast X

==== Television appearances ====
- Fast & Furious Spy Racers (voice)

=== Brian O'Conner ===
Brian O'Conner, played by Paul Walker, appears in the first seven films in the series, except for the third film and Los Bandoleros. Brian is an elite street racer, auto mechanic, a former undercover police officer for an LAPD-FBI task force and a former FBI agent, Mia's husband, and father of Jack and Olivia.

During the events of The Fast and the Furious, Brian is undercover for an LAPD-FBI task force under the alias Brian Earl Spilner. As part of his investigation into a string of hijackings that have resulted in millions of dollars in electronic merchandise being stolen, Brian is charged with infiltrating the Los Angeles street racing scene, as the evidence suggests the culprits are talented racers. His initial contact with Dom and his team goes poorly as Dom's best friend Vince antagonizes Brian into a fight, which leads to Dom banishing him from the store and garnering Brian the nickname "the buster" from the team. However, Brian re-engages them later that night when he lays the pink slip for his Mitsubishi Eclipse down as a wager in a high-stakes race near downtown LA. Dom accepts, but is unable to collect when an LAPD raid leads to the frantic dispersal of all the racers. Dom abandons his car in a parking garage, and is rescued by Brian from being captured by an LAPD patrol officer. Fleeing the police, the duo accidentally enter into the territory of Dom's rival, Johnny Tran, resulting in the destruction of Brian's Eclipse. Due to the earlier terms of the race, Dom holds Brian to his debt, but lets him into his inner circle. Brian presents a totaled Toyota Supra as payment, proposing that if they restore it that it will meet Dom's demands. As they restore the car, Brian becomes closer to both Dom and his sister Mia, whom he begins to date. Under pressure from his superiors with the LAPD and FBI, Brian presses Dom harder to understand where he gets the money to pay for such high-end upgrades to their vehicles. Dom implies that if Brian proves himself at a big upcoming racing event called Race Wars, then he will reveal his secret. During the event, Dom and his crew depart in the middle of the night to hijack a semi truck. Brian reveals his identity to Mia and coerces information out of her to help Dom. The two of them subsequently pursue the crew near Thermal, and find them in the middle of a hijacking gone wrong. Vince, stuck on the truck and wounded by the armed truck driver, is rescued by Brian after Letty is incapacitated, but Brian is forced to reveal his identity to Dom as he calls for an emergency medevac to airlift Vince to safety. Infuriated, Dom leaves with Mia, Leon, and Letty. Brian pursues them to the Toretto household, but Leon and Letty have already fled to avoid arrest. At that same time, Johnny Tran and his cousin Lance perform a drive-by shooting over an earlier dispute, prompting Brian and Dom to pursue them in separate cars. Dom disables Lance in his Dodge Charger while Brian kills Tran by shooting him in the side, causing him to fall off of his dirt bike at high speed. Dom then challenges Brian to a quarter-mile drag race on a stretch of road that has a railroad crossing as the finish line. The two finish in a tie, narrowly beating an oncoming train, but Dom immediately collides with a semi truck advancing from a side street, causing his vehicle to flip multiple times. Running to Dom's aid, Brian understands Dom's dilemma, and not wanting to send him back to prison, hands over the keys to his Supra so that Dom can escape capture by the police.

In a short film The Turbo Charged Prelude for 2 Fast 2 Furious, Brian surrenders his gun and badge at his home in LA, knowing that he will be arrested for letting Dom go. He escapes just as a SWAT team raids his house. He goes on the run in a red Dodge Stealth, earning money via street racing. Losing the Dodge when he is forced to abandon it after police officers recognize the vehicle, he replaces it with a used Nissan Skyline that he repairs and restores with money he earns from subsequent races. He reaches Florida and is forced to choose between New York and Miami. He ultimately chooses Miami, setting the stage for the second film.

In 2 Fast 2 Furious, he is living in Miami as a street racer, but gets caught by U.S. Customs agents. He is offered a deal by his former boss, Agent Bilkins, to take part in a joint Customs/FBI operation in exchange for the cleansing of his criminal record. He and childhood friend Roman Pearce go undercover as street racers to track down and apprehend drug lord Carter Verone. After the mission is a success, their records are cleared and the two plan on opening a garage together with the money that Roman secretly took from Verone's stash.

In Fast & Furious, Brian has parted ways with Roman again after Miami and decided to become an FBI agent. He is given the task of bringing down drug lord Arturo Braga, whose true identity is unknown to public. Brian was contacted by Letty, who wished to become go uncover and help him, in exchange for her and Toretto's criminal records being cleared, but she seemingly dies on the mission. Later, Brian and Dom team up to avenge her death, both infiltrating Braga's crew. Similar to the first film, Brian is under pressure from his superiors to bring in Dom, who is still a fugitive. During the film, Brian makes a deal to have Dominic pardoned for his crimes with a plan to lure Braga into a trap, but the bust is sabotaged and Braga, whose true identity is revealed to be that of his second-in-command Ramon Campos, flees to Mexico. Though the failed trap results in Brian being taken off active duty, he and Toretto team up to successfully apprehend Braga. However, when Toretto is arrested and sentenced to prison as well, Brian resigns from the FBI and teams up with Mia, whose romance with Brian was rekindled at the end of the movie, and members of Toretto's crew to intercept the prison bus to free Dominic from custody.

In Fast Five, Brian, Dom, and Mia are on the run from the law and get caught in a crossfire with corrupt businessman and ruthless drug lord Hernan Reyes in Rio de Janeiro. Left with no other choice after learning that Mia is pregnant with Brian's child, they plot to steal all of Reyes's money to buy their freedom. They assemble a team to pull off a heist to steal $100 million. Brian later speaks with Dom about his father not being there for him and how he does not know anything about him, unlike the close bond that Toretto's father had with his children. He is often worried that he will behave in the manner that his father did, but Toretto reassures him that he is a better man and also promises to keep an eye on him. It is also revealed that Brian has been in juvenile detention with Roman before he became a police officer. Despite interference from Agent Hobbs, who was sent to capture them, the crew pull off the heist and manage to win their freedom. Brian and Mia go to live in Spain, waiting for the birth of their child, while being visited by Dom and his new girlfriend, Elena.

In Fast & Furious 6, Brian, Dom, and Mia live peacefully in the Canary Islands in Spain, where Mia gives birth to their son, Jack O'Conner. Despite promising to leave his former life behind, Brian joins Toretto's team in complying with the request of Agent Hobbs to take down rival gang leader Owen Shaw in exchange for full pardons, especially after learning that Letty is still alive and with Shaw's crew. When the team realizes that Braga worked for Shaw, Brian decides to enter the United States to interrogate him about Letty's survival. After successfully questioning Braga and returning to London, O'Conner starts to feel guilty for letting Letty go undercover, which led to her amnesia and subsequent work for Shaw. The group captures Shaw and convinces Letty to side with them. O'Conner apologizes to Letty, who says that while she might not remember him, she would have gone undercover of her own free will. Shaw reveals that he had captured Mia, leading to a high-speed chase after Shaw's airplane, where Mia is rescued and Shaw is crippled and put into a coma. Hobbs then grants the group's amnesty, and the entire crew move back to America, where Mia, Toretto, and O'Conner have decided to reside in the old Toretto home in Los Angeles.

In Furious 7, Brian is now living in Los Angeles with Mia and their son, where he is struggling to get accustomed to life as a father. Mia voices her concerns to Dom that Brian admitted to missing the excitement of their adventures and also reveals that she is pregnant again but has not told Brian yet. Brian joins Dom's crew in a series of missions which include an airdrop over the Caucasus Mountains to ambush Mose Jakande's convoy, he jumps onto the bus to rescue the hacktivist Ramsey. At Abu Dhabi, he and Dominic break into a billionaire's apartment room to recover the flash drive containing the God's Eye program. He joins Dom and Mr. Nobody, along with a covert ops unit, to try to find and stop Jakande at a warehouse but is ambushed by Jakande himself and his militants. When Jakande goes after Dom's crew in Los Angeles, he is part of the driving team carrying Ramsey, but after his car is destroyed, goes on foot to restore the cell tower connection so that God's Eye can be hacked. Beforehand, Dom speaks with Brian and helps him come to terms that this is his last mission, as Mia and their son are going to need him. While speaking with Mia, Brian voices his concern that he might not survive and asks her to move on if he does not, but she reveals her pregnancy and motivates him to come home to her. Following the death of Jakande, he and Mia reunite to celebrate at the beach with the crew, finally accepting his new life as a father and husband. When Dom leaves, he notices and drives after him, pulling up beside Dom's car in his white Toyota Supra, asking him "You thought you could leave without saying goodbye?" They look at each other and smile, then drive together for a bit before branching off in separate directions. Afterward, Brian and Mia retire to raise their family in peace.

In The Fate of the Furious, Brian appears in a photograph along with Mia, and is mentioned by Letty and Roman when Dom betrays the team due to Cipher's actions. Roman suggests bringing in Brian to help, but Letty immediately reminds him that team agreed to keep Brian and Mia out any conflict they are a part of in order to keep them safe. Dom later names his son after Brian.

In F9, Mia reassures Dom that his son is being taken care of by Brian when she appears to help with their latest mission. At the end of the film, following the crew successfully stopping Otto and Cipher, Dom asks about the empty chair during the dinner celebration and Mia replies that "He's on the way", just as a Nissan Skyline car is heard coming towards the 1327 house to join them.

O'Conner was first unknown with car tuning (he owned a tuned Mitsubishi Eclipse in the first film, but it is hinted this was paid for by the LAPD-FBI task force he had gone undercover for), but after meeting Toretto, he became more positive and active in the racing scene, becoming a skilled mechanic. He is very interested in tuners, especially Nissan Skyline models. He owned two Nissan Skyline GT-R R34's (one in the second movie and one in the fourth, with the latter rebuilt in the ninth movie), Nissan C10 Skyline and finally a Nissan GT-R.

Brian O'Conner is portrayed by Paul Walker.

==== Film appearances ====
- The Fast and the Furious
- The Turbo Charged Prelude for 2 Fast 2 Furious
- 2 Fast 2 Furious
- Fast & Furious
- Fast Five
- Fast & Furious 6
- Furious 7
- Fast X (flashback)

=== Letty Ortiz ===
Leticia "Letty" Ortiz-Toretto, played by Michelle Rodriguez, is married to Dominic, sister in-law to Jakob and Mia Toretto, aunt of Jack and Olivia O'Conner, daughter-in-law of Jack Toretto and stepmother of Brian Marcos. She is also a highly skilled street racer and mechanic.

In The Fast and the Furious, Letty expresses some concern about Dominic's carjacking scheme, but goes along to back him up despite her concerns. In the end, during a botched highway robbery, she rolls her car and is injured, but survives. Due to their criminal activities being exposed, Letty is forced to flee the country.

In Los Bandoleros, Letty tracks down Dom and the two rekindle their romance. Some time between Los Bandoleros and Fast & Furious, she and Dom marry.

During the events of Fast & Furious, she is on Dominic's crew in his heists of fuel tankers in the Dominican Republic, but when the local law enforcement starts closing in, he leaves her behind to protect her from harm, despite telling him that she wishes to be with him no matter what. Several months later, Mia calls Dominic to tell him Letty has been apparently murdered by Fenix. It is later revealed that after she could not find Dominic, Letty contacted FBI agent Brian O'Conner and became a double agent for Braga's crime ring in order to clear Dominic's charges (presumably hers as well) and allow him to come home.

In the mid-credits scene of Fast Five, Luke Hobbs receives a file regarding a robbery, in which Letty's photograph is attached, revealing that she is still alive and part of a new rogue crew.

In Fast & Furious 6, it is revealed that she has amnesia, and is part of a lethally skilled mercenary organization led by Owen Shaw, a criminal mastermind. Dominic makes several attempts to try and reach out to her, but she does not remember him. Dom and Letty eventually talk about a race and he tells her about their history together, but she chooses to remain with Shaw. It is revealed that Brian felt guilty for having Letty be an informant for the FBI to help him to take down Arturo Braga and having this led to her being presumed dead. She is also described as a tough street woman by Riley, due to their first encounter, showcasing that her personality is still intact. During a heist, Shaw tries to have her killed out of spite, but she is rescued by Dominic, gaining her full trust in him. Brian learns from Braga himself that he had found out about Letty's undercover status from Shaw, and that Fenix was supposed to kill her but out of sympathy had given her a chance to live. Shaw decided to do it himself but found that she had the skills needed for his team and used her amnesia to gain her trust. Brian later attempts to apologize to her, but Letty tells him that while she does not remember much about being an informant, she knows that she would not allow someone to force her into doing something she does not want to do. She assists Hobbs, Dom, and the others in stopping both Owen and his crew. Despite not being able to remember her previous life with Dom, she returns home with him stating that "it feels like home".

In Furious 7, Letty temporarily leaves Dom to sort through her amnesia and find out who she is on her own, as she does not entirely have feelings for him. However, Letty rejoins the team in stopping Mose Jakande from activating God's Eye. During the course of the mission, Letty's memories begin to come back after hitting her head in a fight with Kara, including that she and Dom were married some point before Fast & Furious. Letty is last seen with her husband and friends on the beach, commenting on how different things will be now that Brian O'Conner is retiring to be with Mia and their children.

In The Fate of the Furious, Letty and Dom are enjoying their honeymoon in Havana. Everyone is taken by surprise when Dom seemingly betrays them in Berlin. While the others are convinced of his betrayal, only Letty knew something was wrong and suspected someone was blackmailing him. Her suspicion proved true when Cipher and Dom attacked Mr. Nobody's secret base and it is revealed that Elena, Dom's former girlfriend he had dated when it was believed Letty was dead, and her child (Dom's son) have been kidnapped. After stopping Cipher's plan and saving Dom, she is last seen meeting Dom's son, named Brian, and attending a dinner with the crew, along with Hobbs, Mr. Nobody, and Little Nobody.

In F9, Letty is living with Dom and little Brian off the grid on a farm, knowing that Cipher will come for them. The crew arrive and inform them that Cipher had been captured by Mr. Nobody on a plane, but a third party interfered and took her, and that the government wants them to go to the crash site. Letty agrees, while Dom is hesitant at first to go with them on the mission but he decides to join. They run into Dom's younger brother Jakob, a rogue agent who has joined forces with an aristocrat named Otto to obtain a device called Project Aries and holds a personal grudge against his older brother for banishing him. She later teams up with Mia to go to Japan and discovers that Han is alive and in connection Project Aries. After Jakob gets Project Aries, Letty saves Dom from drowning after battling henchmen and helps the crew stop Otto and Cipher from activating Project Aries, aided by Jakob who decides to help them after being betrayed. She sees Jakob drive away after Dom allows him to flee and attends a barbeque with the crew to celebrate their victory.

Letty Ortiz is portrayed by Michelle Rodriguez and young Letty is portrayed by Azia Dinea Hale.

==== Film appearances ====
- The Fast and the Furious
- Fast & Furious
- Los Bandoleros
- Fast & Furious 6
- Furious 7
- The Fate of the Furious
- F9
- Fast X

==== Cars driven ====
- 1997 Nissan 240SX, first film
- 1995 Honda Civic, first film
- 1973 Plymouth Road Runner, fourth film
- 1973 Jensen Interceptor, sixth film
- 1974 Plymouth Barracuda, seventh film
- 2015 Dodge Challenger, seventh film
- 2010 Dodge Viper, seventh film
- 2018 Dodge Challenger SRT Demon, eighth film
- 1970 Chevrolet Chevelle, eighth film
- 1966 Chevrolet Corvette (C2), eighth film
- Local Motors Rally Fighter, eighth film
- 1974 Chevy Nova SS, ninth film
- Harley-Davidson Sportster Iron, ninth

=== Mia Toretto ===
Mia Toretto, played by Jordana Brewster, is Dominic and Jakob's sister, daughter of Jack Toretto and an unnamed woman, mother of Jack and Olivia O'Conner, cousin of Tony and Fernando, and aunt of Brian Marcos Toretto. The mother of the Toretto siblings is unknown, as Mia was raised with her two brothers and father. Racing played a huge role in the family. When Mia was young, her father would help with her homework, often staying up to read ahead in order to help her. After he died in a racing accident and Dom was sent to prison, Jakob helped raise and protect her, until Dom forces him to leave when believing that he was responsible for the crash that killed their father, although Mia apparently never believed it. She tried to stay in contact with him, even breaking into a police station as a teen in order to find him, but would lose track over the years once he became a secret agent under Mr. Nobody.

In The Fast and the Furious, Dom has become a professional criminal in order to support the family and Mia is aware of her brother's crimes, but disapproves and does not involve herself in them, though she cares for her brother nonetheless, due to their strong family bonding. Dominic's friend, Vince, is shown to be attracted to her, although she does not feel the same way. Mia is also shown to be a proficient driver, a trait that runs in the Toretto family. She falls in love with Brian O'Conner, who is secretly an undercover cop sent to infiltrate her brother's group. When he reveals this to Mia, their relationship is estranged but she agrees to help him find Dom and stop his current heist. After Vince was injured during the heist, Mia is last seen at the Toretto household, witnessing Jesse being gunned down by an enemy of Dom's. She is unable to say goodbye to her brother as he flees the country.

In Fast & Furious, Mia is under surveillance by the FBI, as Dom has returned following the apparent death of Letty. She is seen at Letty's funeral and reunites with her brother in secret, revealing that Letty had visited her a couple of times before her death. She tries to get Dom to leave but he chooses to pursue those responsible. Mia also reunites with Brian it is implied that she still has feelings for him. When Dominic gets injured, Brian calls her for medical help and the two later rekindle their romance. When Dom is captured, Brian and Mia lead a rescue mission to free him.

In Fast Five, Mia is on the run with Dom and Brian in Brazil, and pregnant with Brian's child. This news motivates the three to pull off a heist with a crew in order to buy their freedom. Throughout the film, she assists Dominic's crew in the heist by driving and staying back at base with surveillance. After the successful heist, Brian and Mia retire to the Canary Island, finally free.

In Fast & Furious 6, she and Brian now have a son named Jack. After learning of Letty being alive, she motivates Dom and Brian to go after her. Mia is kidnapped by Owen Shaw's henchmen Vegh and Klaus as leverage over Dom, being held aboard a cargo plane. She is rescued by Brian and returns to the U.S. with Dom and the others, having secured pardons.

In Furious 7, Mia is revealed to be pregnant again and worries about Brian's nostalgia after he revealed to her that he "misses the bullets", as he is struggling to adjust to a normal life. She does not get involved in the team's mission for stopping Mose Jakande, instead choosing to take care of Jack in the Dominic Republic at a safe house. She and Brian speak before the final battle with Jakande, revealing her pregnancy and begs him to come back, not wishing to raise their children without him. She is last seen on the beach playing with her family as the rest of the team look on, with Brian finally retiring and accepting his new life with her.

In The Fate of the Furious, Mia does not appear in the film but is mentioned by Letty as she reminds Roman that the team all agreed to keep Brian and her out of any conflict they are a part of.

In F9, Mia returns upon finding out that her missing brother, Jakob Toretto, has been found. She reassures Dom that Brian O'Conner is taking care of his son Brian Marcos, and joins Letty in Tokyo, Japan to search for clues, only to discover that Han is alive. She helps out in the final mission by stopping Otto and Cipher and rescuing Jakob. She celebrates at the end of the film with Dom and the crew, while waiting for Brian to arrive to join them.

Mia Toretto is portrayed by Jordana Brewster and young Mia is portrayed by Siena Agudong.

==== Film appearances ====
- The Fast and the Furious
- Fast & Furious
- Fast Five
- Fast & Furious 6
- Furious 7
- F9
- Fast X

==== Cars driven ====
- 1994 Acura Integra Type R, first film
- 1994 Toyota Supra, first film
- 2003 Acura NSX-T, with Honda NSX Type R Badges and parts fourth and fifth film
- 1965 Ford GT40, fifth film
- 2012 Alfa Romeo Giulietta Quadrifoglio Verde, sixth film
- 1974 Chevy Nova SS, ninth film

=== Roman Pearce ===
Roman "Rome" Pearce, played by Tyrese Gibson, is a childhood friend of Brian O'Conner and a protagonist in the series. Originating from Barstow, California, Roman grew up alongside O'Conner, having met in juvenile detention. Two months after Brian finished Police Academy, Roman was arrested when he was found in a garage with eight stolen cars, and sent to prison for three years and after release, was prohibited to go more than a hundred yards from his home. Although Brian had no prior information for Roman's arrest, Roman overall blamed Brian for the simple fact that he was a cop.

In 2 Fast 2 Furious, Roman and Brian reunite and later mended their friendship when Roman agrees to participate in a sting operation on Miami drug lord Carter Verone in order to have their criminal records cleared. Afterwards, the two later talk about opening their own high-performance garage using pocketed amounts of Verone's drug money that Roman secretly took.

Although not appearing in Fast & Furious, it is revealed that Brian and Roman have split since Miami, although on good terms. While Brian became an FBI agent, Roman started spending time and money gambling in Las Vegas, according to his Fast Five profile.

In Fast Five, Roman is called by Brian to be part of a team to pull off a heist of a $100 million. He is described by Dom and Brian as "fast-talker" (someone who can talk their way through anything, or as Dom puts it, "bullshit his way through anything"). Although reluctant at first, believing it was a personal grudge and not good business, he gets on board once learning how much they were stealing. He provides support to the team and the heist is successful, taking about $10 million as his cut. With his cut of the money, he buys a Koenigsegg CCXR Edition sports car and travels around the world in his own private jet with beautiful women, often meeting with Tej, his friend and fellow crew mate from Miami.

In Fast & Furious 6, Roman once again helps Brian and the team in taking down Owen Shaw in order to be granted pardons, due to their actions in Rio. The team is successful and return to the US as free people, along with the money they had won from their heist. He is last seen at the dinner table of the Toretto household in LA, being the one to say grace as he was the first one to eat.

In Furious 7, Roman helps Dom and Brian take down a mercenary and terrorist named Mose Jakande and rescue a hacker named Ramsey, who Roman and Tej become infatuated with. After Jakande's death, Roman celebrates at the beach with the crew, watching as Brian plays with his son and wife, Mia. He talks about how things will be different now, as Brian is retiring in order to raise and protect his family.

In The Fate of the Furious, Roman continues to be part of the team as they take on missions together. After helping Luke Hobbs with a recent mission, Dom turns on the team and it is revealed that a new enemy named Cipher has blackmailed him into doing so. Roman mentions bringing in Brian to help but Letty reminds him that they all agreed to leave him and Mia out of any conflicts in order to protect them. By the end, Dom is broken free from Cipher's control, although Cipher manages to escape. Roman and Tej continue to pursue Ramsey, although she seemingly rejects both. Roman and the team meet Dom's son, Brian Toretto during a dinner celebration.

In F9, Roman helps Dom and the team in preparing themselves to take down a new covert operative Otto and learns that Han is alive, which Roman is shocked by and even questions him about when seeing him again. Roman and Tej help the team by going to space and destroying a satellite to prevent Project Aries from being used. He joins a barbeque at the currently being rebuilt Toretto household in LA (which was destroyed in Furious 7) and waits for Brian O'Conner to join them.

In Fast X, Roman returns to help Dom and the crew against Cipher's return, along with a new enemy named Dante Reyes.

He is portrayed by Tyrese Gibson.

==== Film appearances ====
- 2 Fast 2 Furious
- Fast Five
- Fast & Furious 6
- Furious 7
- The Fate of the Furious
- F9
- Fast X

==== Cars driven ====
- 1971 Chevrolet Monte Carlo, second film
- 2003 Mitsubishi Eclipse Spyder GTS, second film
- 1970 Dodge Challenger R/T, second film
- 1995 Toyota Supra, fifth film
- 2011 Dodge Charger R/T Police Car, fifth film
- 2009 Koenigsegg CCXR, fifth film
- 2010 BMW E60 M5, sixth film
- 1969 Ford Anvil Mustang, sixth film
- 1968 Chevrolet Camaro Z28, seventh film
- 2012 Bugatti Veyron, seventh film
- 1985 Chevrolet Caprice Classic, seventh film
- 2018 Dodge Challenger SRT Demon, eighth film
- Bentley Continental GT, eighth film
- Lamborghini Murcielago LP640, eighth film
- 2018 Acura NSX, ninth film
- Pontiac Fiero, ninth film
- 2003 Lamborghini Gallardo, tenth film

=== Tej Parker ===
Tej Parker played by Ludacris is an old friend of Brian and later, the best friend and partner of Roman who allows him to participate in races hosted by him near his garage in Miami. Tej does not race anymore, preferring to referee and make money off selling parts out of his garage and also due to what he claims to have stopped him from racing, an injured leg. He has an off-on relationship with Suki. When Brian needs a place to stay, he allows Brian and Roman to stay in his garage rooms for a while. Later, when Brian needs to orchestrate a "scramble" to escape detection by the FBI, Tej shows him another large car garage owned by him, which they use for the scramble. Tej and Suki drive Brian and Roman's Mitsubishis out to be intercepted by the FBI, allowing them to continue their mission which shows that he still can drive as well. Tej also appeared in Fast Five, Fast & Furious 6, Furious 7, The Fate of the Furious, F9 and Fast X as part of Dominic's crew, brought on as their technician expert.

==== Film appearances ====
- 2 Fast 2 Furious
- Fast Five
- Fast & Furious 6
- Furious 7
- The Fate of the Furious
- F9
- Fast X

==== Cars driven ====
- 2002 Acura NSX, second film
- 2001 Dodge Ram, second film
- 2002 Mitsubishi Lancer Evolution VII, with Mitsubishi Lancer O-Z Rally Edition taillights and DAMD body kit second film
- 1963 Ford Galaxie 500, fifth film
- 1994 Toyota Supra, fifth film
- 2009 Koenigsegg CCXR, fifth film
- 2003 Ferrari Enzo/FXX, sixth film
- 2010 BMW E60 M5, sixth film
- 2012 Lucra LC470, sixth film
- 2015 Jeep Wrangler Unlimited, seventh film
- 2010 Ferrari 458, seventh film
- 2016 Mercedes-AMG GT S, eighth film
- Howe & Howe Technologies Ripsaw, eighth film
- 2020 Jeep Gladiator, ninth film
- Jeep Grand Cherokee Trackhawk, ninth film

=== Han Lue ===
Han Lue, also known by the alias Han Seoul-Oh, played by Sung Kang is an aloof former gang member and street racer, a member of Dominic's crew in Fast & Furious, Fast Five and Fast & Furious 6, and Sean Boswell's mentor and friend in The Fast and the Furious: Tokyo Drift.

Chronologically, in Fast & Furious he steals fuel tankers with Dominic, while in Fast Five he joins Dom and Brian's heist team as a precision driver and a "chameleon". While planning the heist in Fast Five, Gisele attributes Han's constant need to occupy his hands to him being a former smoker. After the heist, Han and Gisele start a relationship and travel together through Europe, starting with Berlin. They assist Dom and his crew in taking down Owen Shaw in Fast & Furious 6. However, after Gisele dies saving his life, Han moves to Tokyo.

In The Fast and the Furious: Tokyo Drift, Han hires Sean Boswell as a delivery driver and teaches him how to race against Takashi. During a conspicuous getaway, a silver Mercedes crashes into his car, causing it to flip over and then explode. In the mid-credits scene of Fast & Furious 6, Deckard Shaw (portrayed by Jason Statham) is revealed to have driven the Mercedes after tracking the street racers on a police radio. Dominic goes to Tokyo, Japan to retrieve his body; he and his crew have a funeral for him in Furious 7. Because of his "death", he did not join Dom's team in stopping mercenary and terrorist Mose Jakande and cyberterrorist Cipher from activating God's Eye in Furious 7 and The Fate of the Furious respectively.

F9 reveals that after Gisele's death, Han had been secretly recruited by Mr. Nobody, who helped Han fake his death at the hands of Deckard Shaw. He becomes the protector of Elle, and rejoins the team after it is revealed that she is wanted by rogue covert operative Otto (portrayed by Thue Ersted Rasmussen).

==== Film appearances ====
- The Fast and the Furious: Tokyo Drift
- Fast & Furious
- Los Bandoleros
- Fast Five
- Fast & Furious 6
- F9
- Fast X

Han is portrayed by Sung Kang. In the Fast & Furious 6 production notes, his last name is listed as Lue, while in Furious 7, his name appears in the DSS files as Han Seoul-Oh, a nod to Han Solo from Star Wars. Director Justin Lin has stated that Seoul-Oh is a fake ID.

=== Gisele Yashar ===
Gisele Yashar played by Gal Gadot was the liaison for Braga who developed feelings for Dominic, who does not reciprocate. She warns him of potential danger that awaits him after delivering Braga's heroin across the border. Dominic saves her life in the chaos surrounding the heroin exchange meant as a trap for Braga. She returns the favor by giving the location of Braga's hideout in Mexico. Gisele re-appears alongside Dominic's crew assisting him and Brian in their heist as their weapons expert, where it is revealed that she is a former Mossad agent. She and Han eventually start a relationship and take off to Europe together after the heist in Rio de Janeiro.

Gisele reappears in Fast & Furious 6, along with Han, and helps Dom and the gang take on a rival gang of hijacking, car criminals. In a running gag, she takes pride in her ability to accomplish objectives on her own where men would fail, that is, using her attractiveness to infiltrate Hernan Reyes's bodyguards and Owen Shaw's security. She seemingly falls from the roof of an airborne car to her death while shooting the man who would have shot Han. Her last name in the sixth film's production notes is Harabo, while her file in Fast Five presents it as Yashar. However, Lin has said that, like Han, she was not given a last name. She is portrayed by Gal Gadot.

At the end of Fast X, Gisele is revealed to have survived her fall, as she appears in a submarine to rescue Letty and Cipher from the Agency's Antarctica prison.

==== Film appearances ====
- Fast & Furious
- Fast Five
- Fast & Furious 6
- Fast X (cameo)

=== Luke Hobbs ===
Lucas "Luke" Hobbs played by Dwayne Johnson is a United States Diplomatic Security Service (DSS) agent and bounty hunter. Fast & Furious Presents: Hobbs & Shaw reveals that he grew up in a large Samoan family in Samoa, with at least four younger brothers (Jonah, Mateo, Kal, and Timo are the four brothers who are named); his father, head of an elaborate group of thieves, returned to the island after a long absence to turn his sons into his new crew. Realizing that he was willing to let his sons die, Hobbs turned his father into the law and left Samoa, not returning for at least 20 years before the events of Hobbs & Shaw.

In Fast Five, Hobbs was summoned to take down Dom's crew with maximum priority, mistakenly believing they killed the DEA agents in the train. His first two attempts to capture Dom's team were unsuccessful. After outsmarting Toretto and ambushing him, Mia, Brian, and Vince in their base just before the crew leaves for the heist, he takes them into custody for extradition. After Reyes' men ambush his convoy en route and kill most of his team, Hobbs joins Toretto to steal Reyes' money and personally shoots a badly-injured Reyes in retribution. Faced with the chance to arrest Dom's crew after Reyes' death, he instead offers them a 24-hour head start to get to safety before he will start the search again if they keep the vault as it is, though Hobbs is ultimately duped when he finds the vault empty.

In Fast & Furious 6, he comes to Toretto for help to bring down Owen Shaw, the leader of an international crime syndicate, recognizing that Toretto's team is the best candidate to match Shaw's own skills. He partners up with DSS Agent, Riley Hicks, who turns out to be a double agent who double-crossed Hobbs and Toretto's team. While Riley and Letty are fighting with each other in the airplane, Hobbs tosses a harpoon to Letty, who in return uses it to impale Riley off the airplane, killing her on impact. After the mission is completed, Hobbs grants amnesty to Toretto and his team, the two men publicly disagreeing on which of them was in charge during that mission but privately acknowledging that they trust each other.

In Furious 7, Owen Shaw's older brother, Deckard Shaw, breaks into Hobbs' DSS office to extract profiles of Dom and his crew. After revealing his identity, Shaw engages Hobbs in a fight and later escapes by detonating a bomb that sends Hobbs and his partner Elena flying out of a window, onto a car parked below. Hobbs is rushed to the hospital by Elena, where Dom visits him, learning that Shaw is a former special forces soldier and intelligence agent seeking to avenge his younger brother Owen Shaw. Because of him being injured and resting in the hospital to recover from his injuries, he did not join Dom and his team in stopping mercenary and terrorist Mose Jakande from kidnapping hacker Ramsey and activating God's Eye and requested government agent Mr. Nobody to assist them on his behalf. During the final climactic scene, Hobbs is almost recovering from his injuries whilst still resting in the hospital and was informed of a Predator UAV hunting for Dom's crew through the television when breaking news was broadcast, causing him to escape from the hospital - even breaking his own cast - before destroying it with a stolen ambulance. After Dom attaches the grenades to Jakande's helicopter, Hobbs shoots them, destroying it and killing Jakande himself in a massive explosion.

In The Fate of the Furious, Hobbs initially appears coaching his daughter Samantha's sports team, before being approached by a government contact to conduct an off-the-books mission to retrieve an EMP device from a facility in Berlin and warned that he will be acting unofficially and will face arrest if captured. Although he claims the device with the aid of Dom's team, he is captured after Dom steals the device himself due to the blackmail of cyber-terrorist Cipher, resulting in Hobbs being sent to the same prison as Deckard Shaw. However, he is swiftly 'released' by Mr. Nobody to help Dom's team track down Dom and Cipher, learning that she is seeking to gain control of nuclear launch codes to appoint herself to a position of power over the world. Despite the odds against both Hobbs and Shaw, they and Dom's team manage to track Cipher while Dom sets plans in motion to escape her blackmail himself, culminating in the destruction of the converted Russian nuclear submarine Cipher was planning to use to launch her stolen missiles. Although offered reinstatement after the threat is over, Hobbs decides to remain officially retired to spend more time with his daughter and his new "family", Dom's team.

In Fast & Furious Presents: Hobbs & Shaw, Hobbs is recruited by the CIA as part of a joint task force – also including Deckard Shaw – to capture a seemingly rogue MI6 agent who has apparently stolen a lethal genetically engineered virus with the potential to unleash an extinction-level event. Although Hobbs captures the rogue agent, matters shift when he learns that the woman is Shaw's sister Hattie, and she actually injected herself with the virus to keep it away from Brixton Lore, the man who framed Shaw for killing the rest of his team. Now cybernetically enhanced by Eteon, an organization that believes that human extinction is inevitable and seeks to unleash mass murder to bring humanity into 'balance', Lore attempts to capture Hattie so that Eteon can use the virus to further their own agenda, forcing Hobbs and Shaw to work together to keep her safe. After destroying Eteon's Moscow base and retrieving a device that will allow them to extract the virus, Hobbs takes them to Samoa so that his brother Jonah can repair the damaged equipment before a final confrontation with Lore; this family reunion is tense due to Luke turning their father into the authorities years before. Having disabled Eteon's advanced weapons, Hobbs leads his family in the Siva Tau before they defeat Eteon's forces, working with Shaw to outmaneuver the enhanced Lore by alternating punches, allowing each other to hit and cripple Lore in turn. At the film's conclusion, Lore is killed when Eteon shut down his cybernetics for his failure and Hobbs takes his daughter to Samoa to introduce her to his family but receives a call that another dangerous virus has been stolen.

Luke Hobbs is portrayed by Dwayne Johnson. In July 2021, Johnson announced that he would not be returning for the final two Fast films. In November 2021, Vin Diesel offered for him to return for the final Fast films by sending him a post on Instagram mentioning his own children and Paul Walker, with Johnson turning down the offer and ultimately criticizing the method in which the offer was extended as manipulative. In May 2023, it was announced that Johnson would be returning and reprising his role in a cameo appearance during the post-credits scene for Fast X. In the mid-credits scene of Fast X, during a mission with several operatives agents, Luke Hobbs receives a call from Dante Reyes, who reveals that given Dom only crashed his father Hernan Reyes' car, Hobbs was actually still the one who shot Hernan dead, and that Hobbs will be Dante's next target after Dom.

==== Film appearances ====
- Fast Five
- Fast & Furious 6
- Furious 7
- The Fate of the Furious
- Fast & Furious Presents: Hobbs & Shaw
- Fast X (cameo)

==== Cars driven ====
- Terradyne Gurkha LAPV Armored Vehicle, fifth film
- Navistar MXT, sixth film
- International 4000 ambulance, seventh film
- Land Rover Defender, eighth film
- International MXT, eighth film
- Dodge Ram modified for ice, eighth film

=== Deckard Shaw ===
Deckard "Deck" Shaw is a former UKSF soldier and MI6 agent, the older brother of Owen and Hattie Shaw, and Magdalene's son. He is introduced as the primary villain of Furious 7, seeking revenge against Dom after he put Owen into a coma in Fast & Furious 6. Deckard visits the comatose Owen in a secure hospital in London, where he lives. He sends a message to Dom by apparently killing Han in the mid-credits scene of Fast & Furious 6 and sending a bomb that destroys the Toretto house in Los Angeles. By the end, Dom defeats Deckard in a street brawl and he is arrested by Luke Hobbs and put into a CIA Detention Black Site prison, promising to escape.

In The Fate of the Furious, Deckard is being held in the same high security prison as Hobbs; the two often butt heads, sharing a mutual dislike for each other. Both are recruited into the team by Mr. Nobody to help track Dom and figure out why Dom has betrayed them. Though initially hesitant to work with the team following Furious 7, Deckard has his own motives to destroy Cipher, as she tried to recruit him in her plans and recruited Owen instead when Deckard refused, which started the chain of events that led to the Shaw brothers' feud with Dom and his crew and made Owen comatose. He is seemingly shot by Dom, though it is revealed that his death was faked with the help of his mother Magdalene Shaw. Deckard ultimately redeems himself, and teams up with a recovered Owen to save Dominic's baby son Brian Marcos from Cipher. Deckard is last seen attending the crew's celebratory lunch at the end, where he makes peace with Dom and joins the team.

Hobbs & Shaw introduces his younger sister Hattie and reveals that he was framed for killing his old black ops team 8 years ago by Brixton Lore. Lore is now cybernetically enhanced by Eteon, an organization that believes that human extinction is inevitable and seeks to prevent this through mass murder of the weak via an artificially engineered virus. Forced to work with Luke Hobbs, Shaw is able to defeat Brixton, and his relationship with Hobbs evolves from dislike to a bickering pair of friends.

Shaw later makes a cameo appearance in the post-credits scene of F9, where he is shown trying to interrogate a man when he gets an unexpected visit from Han, shocking him, as he believed Han to be dead. Deckard Shaw is portrayed by Jason Statham and young Deckard is portrayed by Joshua Coombes.

Shaw appears in a minor role in Fast X, where he finds Han and Dom's crew at his doorstep. Shaw believes that Han is coming for revenge and the two fight. After they are infiltrated by the Agency, Shaw and Han work together to fight them, making amends in the process, after which Shaw is forced to leave the group to go find Magdalene who is being tracked by Dante.

==== Film appearances ====
- Fast & Furious 6 (cameo)
- Furious 7
- The Fate of the Furious
- Hobbs & Shaw
- F9 (cameo)
- Fast X

==== Cars driven ====
- 1994 Mercedes-Benz W140, sixth film
- 2008 Aston Martin DB9, seventh film
- 2011 Lamborghini Aventador , seventh film
- 2014 Maserati Ghibli, seventh film
- 2014 Jaguar F-Type R Coupe, seventh film
- Fast Attack Vehicle, seventh film
- 2016 Jaguar F-Type R Coupe, eighth film
- 2018 McLaren 720S, Hobbs & Shaw
- 2018 McLaren Senna, tenth film

=== Ramsey ===
Ramsey is a British computer hacker and the creator of God's Eye, a program capable of tracking a specific person through digital services and coveted by mercenary Mose Jakande. Ramsey was a prisoner of Jakande, until Dom and his crew rescue her. Subsequently, she assists Dom and his crew in collecting the God's Eye, stating that she trusts them more than her previous captors as the team is clearly brought together by respect and trust rather than the fear that kept her captors loyal. When she makes contact with her associate Safar, she learns that the hard drive has been sold away to a Jordanian prince despite her previous warning to keep it safe. When they lose the program to Jakande, Ramsey helps the crew to hack and regain control of it, then shuts it down.

Ramsey returns in The Fate of the Furious, having joined Dom's team as a secondary technical advisor to Tej. Due to being the newest member, she was the one who doubted Dom the most after his betrayal. Throughout the film, she is constantly in the middle of Roman and Tej's respective advances towards her: after Cipher is defeated, she admits that she likes both of them, but would only choose one of them if they figured out what her last name is.

She again reappears in F9, where she and the rest of the crew prepare themselves to take down a new covert operative Otto. It is revealed in the film that Ramsey has never learned to drive and does so for the first time in a chase. Ramsey is portrayed by Nathalie Emmanuel.

==== Film appearances ====
- Furious 7
- The Fate of the Furious
- F9
- Fast X

=== Jakob Toretto ===
Jakob Toretto is the estranged brother of Dom and Mia, brother-in-law of Brian O'Conner and Letty Ortiz, uncle of Jack, Olivia and Brian. He works as a master thief, assassin and a high performance driver. He was Mr. Nobody's subordinate, but went criminal prior to the series. It is later revealed that Dom banished Jakob from the family after he accused him of killing Jack with a sabotaged engine. Soon after, Jakob was taken in by Buddy, one of the members of their father's pit crew. Due to this, Jakob holds a personal grudge against Dom, who he claims to have "turned his back" on him, despite Dom's "never turn your back on family" motto, and wants him to either "live under his shadow" or get killed. This grudge leads Jakob and his personal associate Otto to capture the cyber-terrorist Cipher and force her to give them the remaining pieces to Project Aries, a device that can hack into any computer weapons system. Jakob reveals to Dom that Jack wanted to escape debt and ordered Jakob to comply with the sabotage in order to throw the race, whist keeping Dom oblivious to the truth. Towards the end of F9, however, Otto double-crosses Jakob and begins working with Cipher, causing the brothers to reconcile and collaborate, destroying Cipher's drone. At the end of the film, Dom finally forgives Jakob for his role in their father's death, handing over his Dodge Charger's keys to escape, similar to how Brian gave Dom a chance in the first film. Jakob Toretto is portrayed by John Cena and young Jakob is portrayed by Finn Cole.

==== Film appearances ====
- F9
- Fast X

==== Cars driven ====
- 1968 Dodge Charger 500, ninth film
- 1992 Ford Mustang, ninth film and tenth film
- 2012 Toyota GT86, ninth film
- 2015 Ford Mustang GT, ninth film
- 2020 Toyota Supra, ninth film

== Supporting characters ==
=== Supporting characters introduced in The Fast and the Furious ===
==== Vince ====
Vince is a childhood friend and street racer under Dominic Toretto. He opposed Brian O'Conner's inclusion into Dominic's crew especially since his sister favored O'Conner over him. During Race Wars, Johnny Tran blames Dominic for the SWAT forces that came into his house, disrespecting his whole family for being narced out by someone and they get into a fight. Vince then leads Dominic away telling him to chill out. Towards the end of The Fast and the Furious, Vince is seriously injured when he is shot by a trucker whose shipments he attempted to hijack. He recovers from his injuries, escapes from the hospital, and goes to Rio de Janeiro. He is not present or mentioned in Fast & Furious, but can be seen in a picture with Letty and Dominic at Letty's funeral, although his face is not clear. Vince re-appears in Fast Five living in the favelas of Rio de Janeiro with his wife, Rosa and infant son, Nico (who is named after Dominic). He tries to steal one of three cars on a train he attempted to hijack in an earlier mission, but it goes awry. Dominic's trust in his longtime friend is strained for a time when he was caught hiding information from the team, but ultimately regains that trust after saving Mia from being killed and joins Dominic's heist team. Before the crew could perform their heist on Reyes, he is captured by Hobbs along with Dominic, Brian and Mia, but is fatally wounded while saving Hobbs from Zizi's ambush on the convoy. Before he dies, Dominic promises Vince that he will watch over Rosa and Nico. After the successful heist on Reyes, Dominic gives Vince's share to Rosa and Nico, promising to visit soon. Vince is portrayed by Matt Schulze and young Vince is portrayed by Karson Kern.

Film appearances

- The Fast and the Furious
- Fast Five
- F9

Cars driven

- 1998 Nissan Maxima with Dodge Viper GTS Blue Paint, first film
- 1995 Honda Civic, first film
- 1971 DeTomaso Pantera GT5-S, fifth film

==== Leon ====
Leon is a friend and street racer under Dominic Toretto. Leon acts as a dispatcher during the street race at the beginning of the film alerting everyone of police presence, and is a participant in the truck heist gone bad. His whereabouts after the first film are unknown and is presumed to be devastated over the death of Jesse by Johnny Tran and Lance and as well as Vince by Hernan Reyes and his men. Leon is portrayed by Johnny Strong, the lead singer of post-grunge band Operator.

Film appearances

- The Fast and the Furious

Cars driven

- 1996 Nissan Skyline R33 GT-R, first film
- 1995 Volkswagen Jetta GLX, first film
- 1995 Honda Civic, first film

==== Jesse ====
Jesse is a street racer and the brains of Dominic's operations, and he is a wheelman in the heists. Jesse admits to having ADHD and is shown often stuttering in his speeches and acting very nervous. Despite this setback, he is the computer nerd of the group as he is responsible for creating the designs, doing background checks on people, and hacking the engine characteristics of Toretto's race vehicles with precise calculations (a potential characteristic of those with ADHD as they may at times have high IQs). However, he is somewhat irresponsible, a fact which was evident when he raced Johnny Tran for pink slips against the wishes of both Dominic and Brian who warned him that Tran had over $100,000 under the hood of his vehicle. This proved to be true as Jesse lost to Tran, later driving off and escaping his loss. An enraged Tran and an accomplice later pull a drive-by shooting at Toretto's house missing everyone but Jesse, who gets hit, killing him instantly. Dominic and Brian chase after Tran, shooting him dead and avenging Jesse's death. Jesse is portrayed by Chad Lindberg and young Jesse is portrayed by Igby Rigney.

Film appearances

- The Fast and the Furious
- F9

Cars driven

- 1995 Volkswagen Jetta, first film
- 1995 Honda Civic, first film

==== Hector ====
Hector is a former street racer and organizer. He is a friend to both Dominic and Brian. In The Fast and the Furious, Hector organizes and attends the original race in which Dominic and Brian participate, which is later interrupted by the police; he has a last name, but claims he "can't pronounce it". Brian begins investigating Hector and Tran's activities and is convinced that Tran is behind the hijackings, believing his suspicions are founded when he discovers an unusual purchase made by Hector in The Racer's Edge (the parts shop where Brian works). Hector later throws a party at El Gato Negro, but his whereabouts after this party are unknown. Hector returns in Furious 7, where he takes an accidental punch from Letty at the Race Wars after she has a traumatic flashback when the girl fans from the race wars pick on her, but Hector is not angry; Dominic jokes that he "never could take a punch". Hector is portrayed by Noel Gugliemi.

Film appearances

- The Fast and the Furious
- Furious 7

=== Supporting characters introduced in 2 Fast 2 Furious ===
==== Suki ====
Suki is a friend of Brian and sometimes girlfriend of Tej Parker in 2 Fast 2 Furious. She is shown to have a highly competitive nature but she is also an excellent driver by handling losses easily. Despite that Brian has won against her numerous times, they remain good friends, and she later helps Brian and Pearce out by driving Pearce's Mitsubishi Eclipse along with Tej to allow the pair to escape custody. Suki appeared in the flashback scenes of Brian O'Conner in Furious 7. In Fast X, Suki is revealed to be one of Dante Reyes' targets from his vision board.

Suki is portrayed by Devon Aoki. Suki's car had appeared in the music videos of Ludacris' "Act a Fool", Pink's "Stupid Girls" and Lindsay Lohan's "First".

Film appearances

- 2 Fast 2 Furious
- Furious 7 (flashback)

Cars driven

- 2000 Honda S2000, second film
- 2003 Mitsubishi Eclipse Spyder GTS, second film

==== Jimmy ====
Jimmy is a mechanic who works for Tej and is a close friend of Brian. He makes a few appearances in 2 Fast 2 Furious, including one which he freestyle raps during a poker game at Tej's garage. He is portrayed by MC Jin.

Film appearances

- 2 Fast 2 Furious

==== Slap Jack ====
Slap Jack is one of the street racers in the first race of the movie. While trying to beat Brian O'Conner's Skyline using nitrous, Brian outsmarts him also using the nitrous and jumping first off the bridge. After jumping the draw bridge, his Supra gets severely damaged and crashes into a Pepsi billboard while Brian wins the race. Although his Supra is rebuilt during the scramble scene. He is portrayed by Michael Ealy. The character appeared in the flashback scenes of Brian O'Conner in Furious 7. Slap Jack's car made appearances in the films Today You Die and The Last Ride and the short film The Turbo Charged Prelude for 2 Fast 2 Furious, as well as music videos Ludacris' "Act a Fool" and Lindsay Lohan's "First".

Film appearances

- 2 Fast 2 Furious
- Furious 7 (flashback)

Cars driven

- 1993 Toyota Supra MK4, second film

==== Orange Julius ====
Orange Julius is another street racer during the first race of the film. He is Spanish-American and wears an orange cap and an orange suit to hint his name. During the race, he tries to reach the bridge jump, but just stopped instead, refusing to finish the race. It is unknown if he finished the race or not if the bridge closed or opened. He is also seen during the scramble sequence in the end of the movie. His name is unrelated to the fruit beverage restaurant of the same name. The character appeared in the flashback scenes of Brian O'Conner in Furious 7. His RX-7 is similar to Dominic Torreto's RX-7 from the first film minus the spoiler. He is portrayed by Amaury Nolasco. Orange Julius' car made appearances in the films Today You Die and The Last Ride, and the short film The Turbo Charged Prelude for 2 Fast 2 Furious, as well as music videos Ludacris' "Act a Fool" and Lindsay Lohan's "First".

Film appearances;

- 2 Fast 2 Furious
- Furious 7 (flashback)

Cars driven

- 1992 FD Mazda RX-7, second film

=== Supporting characters introduced in The Fast and the Furious: Tokyo Drift ===
==== Sean Boswell ====
Sean Boswell played by Lucas Black is the protagonist of The Fast and the Furious: Tokyo Drift. He is a 17-year-old loner in school during the events of the film. After having three strikes of street racing in the United States, Sean's mother sent him to Tokyo, Japan, to live with his father and avoid jail time. In Japan he was introduced to the drift racing scene and made good friends with Han, a former member of Dominic Toretto's crew and Sean's supporter throughout the film. He eventually met Dom at the end of the film and raced him through a parking garage. After the race, he talks with Dom about Han and gives him some of Han's personal effects which were found after the crash.

Aside from Han and Dom, Sean had no connection to any other major characters in the series until F9, where Sean, along with Twinkie and Earl, who are now in their 20s, are all working at an airbase in Cologne, building a Pontiac Fiero with a rocket engine, and meet with Roman and Tej, who are looking for some vehicles which they could get their hands on. They then test the rocket car while Roman and Tej observe, but the car explodes from some distance away. Sean and Earl then help Roman and Tej with their space mission in destroying Otto's satellite and both along with Twinkie join Dom and family at the 1327 house in Los Angeles, where the three reunite with Han. In Fast X, Sean is revealed to be one of Dante Reyes' targets from his vision board.

Sean Boswell is portrayed by Lucas Black.

Film appearances

- The Fast and the Furious: Tokyo Drift
- Furious 7 (cameo)
- F9

Cars driven

- 1971 Chevrolet Monte Carlo, third film
- 2003 Volkswagen Touran, with The Incredible Hulk paint and body scheme, third film
- 2001 Nissan Silvia S15 with a Nissan RB Engine, third film
- 2006 Mitsubishi Lancer Evolution VIII, with an APR wide-body aero kit and RWD conversion, third and sixth (post-credits) film
- 1997 Mazda RX-7, with Veilside body kit, third film (Han Instructed to drive)
- 1967 Ford Mustang GT with a Nissan RB Engine, third film
- Nissan Silvia S15, third and seventh film

==== Twinkie ====
Twinkie is Sean's first friend he meets in Tokyo. He takes and introduces him to the world of drifting where Sean wrecks Han's favorite car. He is one of Han's crew who helps Sean in the movie. He is a mechanic more than a street racer and also sells pre-owned goods. During the events of F9, Twinkie is now working with Sean and Earl in Germany. Twinkie is portrayed by Bow Wow.

Film appearances

- The Fast and the Furious: Tokyo Drift
- Furious 7 (cameo)
- F9

Cars driven

- 2003 Volkswagen Touran with The Incredible Hulk paint and body scheme, third film
- 2005 Volkswagen Golf R32, third film and deleted scene

==== Earl ====
Earl is one of Han's friends and crew member who tunes for racers, using stand-alone fuel management systems to control fuel and timing. During the events of F9, Earl is now a rocket scientist working with Sean and Twinkie. Earl is portrayed by Jason Tobin.

Film appearances

- The Fast and the Furious: Tokyo Drift
- F9

==== Neela Ezar ====
Neela Ezar is the love interest of Sean Boswell. When Sean arrives in Japan and goes to school, he meets Neela in class. When Sean goes to the drifting world with Twinkie, he sees Neela and begins talking to her then he realizes that she is with Takashi when confronted by him. Later, Neela claims that she grew up with Takashi after her mother died. As the movie goes on, she starts to like Sean even more. When Han is supposedly and seemingly killed in a car crash, she was taken by Takashi. Eventually in the end, she ends up with Sean after he defeats Takashi on a final race down a mountain.

Neela is portrayed by Nathalie Kelley.

Film appearances

- The Fast and the Furious: Tokyo Drift

Cars driven

- 2004 Mazda RX-8, third film

==== Reiko ====
Reiko is the other friend and crew member of Han's. She is a data-log analyzer that helps Earl tune by checking the driving habits and various engine telemetry stored in data-logs. Reiko is portrayed by Keiko Kitagawa.

Film appearances

- The Fast and the Furious: Tokyo Drift

Cars driven

- 2005 Volkswagen Golf R32, third film and deleted scenes

=== Supporting characters introduced in Fast & Furious ===
==== Cara Mirtha ====
Cara Mirtha is Han's girlfriend and member of Toretto's crew in the beginning of Fast & Furious and she stays with Han during the heist. She presumably breaks up with Han afterward, since Han is single in Fast Five and begins a relationship with Gisele at the end of the film. Her sister, Leysa Mirtha, appears in F9. Cara Mirtha is portrayed by Mirtha Michelle.

Film appearances

- Fast & Furious
- Los Bandoleros

==== Rico Santos ====
Rico Santos was a member of Toretto's crew in the beginning of the film and then in the end when they are busting Dominic out of the prison bus. He is in Dominic's crew assisting with the heist in Rio de Janeiro. Rico does not join Dom and his crew in capturing Owen Shaw in Fast & Furious 6 and stopping Mose Jakande in Furious 7, his absence explained as him having been last seen at a casino with Tego in Monte Carlo. In The Fate of the Furious, he is seen with Tego on the ambulance taking Deckard Shaw to the hospital. In F9, Rico is seen attending Toretto's crew's barbecue celebratory meal and tells Mia that Leo has opened up a restaurant in New York, and jokes that the food is bad. In Fast X, Rico is revealed to be one of Dante Reyes' targets from his vision board. Rico Santos is portrayed by Don Omar and young Rico is portrayed by Ozuna.

Film appearances

- Fast & Furious
- Los Bandoleros
- Fast Five
- The Fate of the Furious (cameo)
- F9

Cars driven

- 1993 Ford Club Wagon, fifth film
- 1994 Toyota Supra, fifth film

==== Tego Leo ====
Tego Leo is a member of Toretto's crew in the beginning of Fast & Furious. He drives the car at the end of the film with Santos when they go with Brian and Mia to get Dominic out of the prison bus. During the events of Fast Five, he is in Dominic's crew assisting with the heist in Rio de Janeiro. Afterwards, Tego and his friend Rico were last seen in a casino in Monte Carlo and did not join Dom and his crew in their missions to capture Owen Shaw in Fast & Furious 6 and stopping Mose Jakande in Furious 7. In The Fate of the Furious, Tego and Rico are part of the elaborate deception pulled off to fake Deckard Shaw's death. The two load Deckard onto the ambulance to take him to the hospital. Despite not appearing in F9, he was mentioned by Rico when telling Mia that he has opened up a restaurant in New York, and jokes that the food is bad. In Fast X, Tego is revealed to be one of Dante Reyes' targets from his vision board. Tego Leo is portrayed by Tego Calderón and young Tego is portrayed by Cered.

Film appearances

- Fast & Furious
- Los Bandoleros
- Fast Five
- The Fate of the Furious (cameo)

Cars driven

- 1989 Chevrolet R3500 Crew Cab, fourth film
- 1978 Pontiac Trans Am, fourth and fifth film
- 2009 Nissan 370Z, fifth film

=== Supporting characters introduced in Furious 7 ===
==== Safar ====
Safar is an Emirati mechanic and Ramsey's associate in Abu Dhabi. Ramsey gave him a flash drive containing the God's Eye program, but not knowing its importance, he sold it to a Jordanian prince. To make amends, Safar tips Dom and his crew as to where the drive is located. Safar is portrayed by Ali Fazal.

Film appearances

- Furious 7

==== Mando ====
Mando is Dom's friend who lives in the Dominican Republic. He invites Brian, Mia and Jack to his place to hide from mercenary and terrorist Mose Jakande. While Dom, Brian and their crew are going after Jakande, he watches over Mia. While Brian and Mia were staying at his place, Brian built a surveillance hub in Mando's garage. Mando is portrayed by Romeo Santos.

Film appearances

- Furious 7

=== Supporting characters introduced in The Fate of the Furious ===
==== Magdalene Shaw ====
Magdalene "Queenie" Shaw (Helen Mirren) is the mother of Deckard, Owen and Hattie Shaw. Little of her life is revealed, but she appears to be a crime boss of some sort, with a fearsome reputation. She seems to be aware of the trouble her sons caused in Fast & Furious 6 and Furious 7. In The Fate of the Furious, Dom arranges her sons' freedom from government custody if she has them rescue his son from Cipher's plane. Though initially hesitant to work with Dom due to the events of the sixth and seventh films, she accepts the deal and later helps Deckard fake his death while giving him a device that will help him and Owen get access to the plane. She is later incarcerated prior to the events of Hobbs & Shaw and has made several half-hearted attempts to escape (considering being "banged-up" as something akin to a vacation or retirement). At the end of the film, it is implied that Deckard and Hattie free her using a device they hid in a cake. She appears again in F9, where Dom goes to her for information about Jakob's location.

Film appearances

- The Fate of the Furious
- Fast & Furious Presents: Hobbs & Shaw
- F9
- Fast X

Cars driven

- 2018 Noble M600, ninth film

=== Supporting characters introduced in Fast & Furious Presents: Hobbs & Shaw ===
==== Margarita / Madam M ====
Margarita, also known as Madam M, is a professional thief and contact of Deckard. She and Deckard appear to have been romantically involved, although the extent of their relationship is not revealed. After Deckard comes to her for assistance with extracting the Snowflake virus from Hattie at the Eteon headquarters, Margarita helps Deckard, Hattie, and Hobbs infiltrate the headquarters by pretending that she captured Hattie to deliver her to the terrorist organization. She is portrayed by Eiza González.

Film appearances

- Fast & Furious Presents: Hobbs & Shaw

==== Professor Andreiko ====
Professor Andreiko is a Russian scientist who created the Snowflake virus. Andreiko intended to use the virus for benevolent purposes, but it was manipulated by Eteon to become a biological weapon. After Hobbs, Deckard, and Hattie contact him about removing the virus from Hattie's body, he is captured by Eteon operative Brixton Lore and forced to assist the terrorist organization in acquiring Snowflake. When Hattie, Hobbs, and Deckard infiltrate Eteon's headquarters, Andreiko helps them escape by arming himself with a flamethrower before he is killed by Brixton. Andreiko is portrayed by Eddie Marsan.

Film appearances

- Fast & Furious Presents: Hobbs & Shaw

==== Jonah Hobbs ====
Jonah Hobbs is a mechanic and the estranged older brother of Luke, living in Samoa with the rest of his family. Tensions between him and Luke stem from Luke having their father arrested when he continually involved his sons in his criminal activities (Jonah later went legit as a mechanic, starting a customs renovated cars shop, named "Jobbs"). Nevertheless, when Luke comes to him for help in defeating Eteon, the brothers mend their relationship and Jonah repairs the extraction device needed to remove Snowflake virus from Hattie's blood, saving her life. Afterwards, Luke brings his daughter Sam to Samoa to meet Jonah and the rest of her extended family. Jonah is portrayed by Cliff Curtis.

Film appearances

- Fast & Furious Presents: Hobbs & Shaw

==== Sefina Hobbs ====
Sefina "Mama" Hobbs (Lori Pelenise Tuisano) is the mother of titular character, Luke Hobbs, mechanic, Jonah Hobbs, and of numerous other sons; she is the undisputed matriarch of the Hobbs extended-family, armed with her voice and her slipper. Native to Samoa, she raised all of her son by herself until their father (her husband(?)), a criminal, showed-up and roped them into a life of crime, only really interested in them as a new criminal crew, with no qualms over their safety. After Luke, her eldest son, turned their father in to the law, and left Samoa, Sefina Hobbs did not see her eldest son again for 25-years before the events of Hobbs & Shaw, finally getting to meet Sam Hobbs, her granddaughter by Luke. While Sefina Hobbs is big on the sanctity of family, she clearly approved of Luke turning her husband in, as he was dragging them into increasingly bigger and more dangerous jobs. She is also against guns, both because they have been used to kill members of her family in the past, and because she is of the opinion that it "doesn't take a real man to pull a trigger".

Film appearances

- Fast & Furious Presents: Hobbs & Shaw

=== Supporting characters introduced in F9 ===
==== Jack Toretto ====
Jack Toretto is the father of Dominic, Jakob and Mia. It is unknown about the mother's status, but Jack raised all three of his children, even helping Mia with her homework and staying up to read ahead on the subjects after she went to sleep in order to help her the next day. He tries to raise Dom and Jakob as better men so that they do not repeat the same mistakes as him. During the last stock car race of the season in 1989, Jack was clipped by Kenny Linder through the bumper, causing him to violently run into the wall at high speed. Jack was killed instantly in the crash as his car burst into flames upon impact. In F9, it is revealed that he had told Jakob to mess with the vehicle in order to throw a race and pay back the money he owed in order to help his family, but the ensuing crash backfired. Mia and her husband, Brian, name their son after him. Jack Toretto is portrayed by J. D. Pardo.

Film appearances

- F9

==== Elle Lue ====
Elle Lue is the daughter of a Japanese scientist couple and Han Lue's adoptive daughter who were involved in the development of Project Aries. After the completion of the project, Elle's family returned to Japan during the events of The Fast and the Furious: Tokyo Drift, settling down in Tokyo, only for Elle to witness the death of her parents in an orchestrated car blast one rainy night and later on being pursued by an unknown group of mercenaries. This ultimately led to her chance encounter with Han (who was working for Mr. Nobody at that time on a mission). Han rescued her from her pursuers, making her his ward and family, and raised her while faking his death to safeguard himself from Deckard Shaw. Years later during the events of F9, Elle has a chance meeting with Letty and Mia in Han's old hideout, helping them fight Otto's assassins and revealing Han's survival. She, along with Han, later unites with Dom's team, where (besides Han explaining how he survived Deckard Shaw's attempt to kill him) it is revealed that her DNA is the biometric key to activate Project Aries. She is soon abducted by Otto's army, who force her to help them activate the device. Elle, however, is soon rescued from her captors by Han and the rest of the team (after which she lends a hand in fending off Otto's men), while Roman and Tej successfully destroy the satellite connected to the device. She is later seen visiting Dom's old home with Han to celebrate the team's victory with the others. In Fast X, Elle is revealed to be one of Dante Reyes' targets from his vision board. Elle is portrayed by Anna Sawai and young Elle is portrayed by Juju Zhang.

Film appearances

- F9

==== Leysa Mirtha ====
Leysa Mirtha is an old acquaintance of Dominic Toretto. In the past, Leysa used to be a thief stealing car parts and gas tanks, until Dom helped her improve her financial condition. She is the sister of Cara, Han's former love interest during Dominic Toretto's crew stint in Dominican Republic. In the present, she is seen leading a small all-female group of mercenaries/ con artists. Being grateful to Dom for helping her in the past, she cooperates in his escape from a tricky situation while coming face-to-face with Jakob in Edinburgh. Leysa is portrayed by Cardi B.

Film appearances

- F9

==== Buddy ====
Buddy is an auto-mechanic and an old acquaintance of Dominic Toretto, who also used to be a close friend of Dom's father Jack. He was among the witnesses of the fatal accident which killed Jack. After Dom banished Jakob, he arranged for him to stay with Buddy, who took care of him until Jakob suddenly left, though Buddy kept track of his location. Being aware of the truth behind Jack's death, he was initially reluctant to inform Dom about Jakob being in London, knowing that the reunion of the brothers after many years could get ugly because of what happened in the past, though he eventually gave in due to Dom insisting it being urgent. In Fast X, Buddy is revealed to be one of Dante Reyes' targets from his vision board. Buddy is portrayed by Michael Rooker.

Film appearances

- F9

=== Supporting characters introduced in Fast X ===
==== Abuelita Toretto ====
Abuelita Toretto is the grandmother of Dominic, Mia and Jakob Toretto and the mother of Jack Toretto. Abulieta is portrayed by Rita Moreno.

Film appearances

- Fast X

==== Isabel Neves ====
Isabel Neves is a street racer and the sister of Dom's former girlfriend Elena Neves. She is nearly killed by Dante during their race in Rio, though Dom manages to save her. She is later kidnapped by Dante during the attack on Dom and Aimes, but is saved by Dom again and later takes a wounded Tess to the hospital. Isabel is portrayed by Daniela Melchior.

Film appearances

- Fast X

Cars driven

- 1975 Datsun 280Z, tenth film
- 2018 Chevrolet Camaro ZL1, tenth film

== Antagonists ==
=== Antagonists introduced in The Fast and the Furious ===
==== Johnny Tran ====
Johnny Tran is the head of an opposing race crew to Dominic Toretto and implied to be involved in some form of organized crime. He is first seen blowing up Brian O'Conner's car, originally owned by Sgt. Tanner, with his gang's machine guns near the beginning of the film. It is soon revealed that their business deal went sour when Johnny found his sister sleeping with Dominic. Later, as O'Conner and Dominic spy on Tran at his garage, he is seen with his accomplice (and cousin) Lance interrogating a man named Ted Gassner regarding engines in his vehicles, which is also where they spot several boxes of merchandise in his garage (the kind being robbed in the film from truckers). This leads Brian O'Conner to organize a large SWAT assault team to invade Tran's house, only to find a few minor weapons charges and other minor issues. Tran gets slapped by his father for this and learned he destroyed Sgt. Tanner's car and pays $80,000 of the car. After being bailed out, Tran is later seen at the Race Wars, racing Jesse for pink slips. Both Dominic and Brian warn Jesse about Tran's vehicle having over $100,000 worth of upgrades, but Jesse ignores them and races Tran anyway. After Tran wins, he then confronts Dominic, accusing him of the SWAT team invasion of his home, which disrespected him in front of his entire family (unaware that the man responsible, Brian O'Conner, is right there in front of him; he soon becomes aware of this near the end). Dominic then delivers a right hook to Tran's face, and the two men scuffle on the ground before being broken up by the crowd. After Tran and Lance kill Jesse in a drive-by shooting while driving motorcycles, Brian and Dominic chase after the two, ending with Brian shooting Tran, killing him. Johnny Tran is portrayed by Rick Yune.

Film appearances

- The Fast and the Furious

Cars driven

- Kawasaki KLR650, first film
- 2000 Honda S2000, first film

==== Lance Nguyen ====
Lance Nguyen is Johnny's cousin and henchman, who is known for his love of Snakeskin pants. He also destroyed Brian O'Conner's car owned by Sgt Tanner. He is arrested by Sgt. Tanner the owner of the car he and his cousin destroyed and later released from jail and Tran's father pays $80,000 of the vehicle that Lance and Tran destroyed. Tran and his accomplice Lance later pull a ride-by shooting at Dominic's house, narrowly missing everyone except Jesse, who was killed in the process. Dominic drove his 1970 Dodge Charger R/T into his dirt bike, resulting in Lance being gravely injured in the crash. What became of him afterwards is unknown. Lance is portrayed by Reggie Lee.

Film appearances

- The Fast and the Furious

Cars driven

- Honda CR250M, first film

=== Antagonists introduced in 2 Fast 2 Furious ===
==== Carter Verone ====
Carter Verone is a drug dealer in Miami in 2 Fast 2 Furious who puts out the word that he needs drivers to deliver a "package", leading Customs and the FBI to place Brian O'Conner and Roman Pearce undercover as drivers in order to land charges on him. When O'Conner and Pearce learn that Verone plans to execute the two of them after his package is delivered, they hatch a plot to thwart him. O'Conner and Pearce successfully capture Verone at the end of the film. Carter Verone is portrayed by Cole Hauser.

==== Enrique ====
Enrique is Verone's henchman. He is beaten up by Brian and Roman after trying to kill Brian on Verone's orders. Enrique is portrayed by Matt Gallini.

Film appearances

- 2 Fast 2 Furious

==== Roberto ====
Roberto is Verone's other henchman. He is thrown out of Roman's car by an ejector seat. Roberto is portrayed by Roberto Sanchez.

Film appearances

- 2 Fast 2 Furious

Cars driven

- 1968 Cadillac DeVille convertible, second film
- 1998 Dodge Durango, second film

=== Antagonists introduced in The Fast and the Furious: Tokyo Drift ===
==== Takashi ====
Takashi is a street racer who was acknowledged as the best drift racer in Tokyo given the title "DK" (Drift King). He first confronts Sean at the drift race when Sean is talking to Neela. In the first race between them he easily beats Sean while Sean demolishes Han's favorite car. When Takashi's uncle Kamata comes to town he realizes that Han has been skimming money from their business and reprimands Takashi for not noticing and disobeys his uncle, which resulted in Takashi himself and his best friend Morimoto in confronting and chasing Han and Sean down. During the chase, Han is seemingly killed in a car crash and he takes Neela back. At the end he is beaten by Sean going down the mountain but still survives the crash. It is unknown what happened to him after the race, but in a deleted scene, he was apprehended by his uncle's henchmen. Takashi is portrayed by Brian Tee.

Film appearances

- The Fast and the Furious: Tokyo Drift

Cars driven

- 2002 Nissan Fairlady 350Z w/ Veilside Mk. III Wide-body kit, third film

==== Morimoto ====
Morimoto was Takashi's close friend. Morimoto confronts Sean with Han and Takashi when Sean is talking to Neela at the drifting site. He also confronts and beats up Twinkie when he believes Twinkie sold him a broken iPod until Sean breaks up the fight who gives Morimoto his own iPod to replace the broken one. When Takashi goes to confront Han about skimming money from Takashi's business, Morimoto accompanies him. While chasing Han and Sean he crashes his 350Z into a Lexus GS 400 and dies instantly on impact. Morimoto is portrayed by Leonardo Nam.

Film appearances

- The Fast and the Furious: Tokyo Drift

Cars driven

- 2002 Nissan Fairlady 350Z with Top Secret wide-body kit, third film

==== Clay ====
Clay is the bullying high school quarterback. He appears at the beginning of the film when he agrees to race Sean after witnessing Sean talking to his girlfriend which caused a fight to occur at the school. He crashes both cars during the race but manages to escape punishment with the help of his parents due to their wealth, leading Sean to go to Tokyo. Clay is portrayed by Zachery Ty Bryan.

Film appearances

- The Fast and the Furious: Tokyo Drift

Cars Driven

- 2006 Dodge Viper, third film

=== Antagonists introduced in Fast & Furious ===
==== Arturo Braga ====
Arturo Braga is a drug trafficker who first appears as "Ramon Campos" in Fast & Furious. During a botched sting operation, it is revealed that Campos is actually Braga himself and he escapes to Mexico, but he is later captured by Brian and Dominic and brought back to the USA. He makes a cameo appearance in Fast & Furious 6 when Brian returns to the U.S. as a prisoner to question him regarding his connection to Owen Shaw. Braga discloses how Letty survived the explosion that was thought to have killed her before he and his men fight Brian, which results in Braga being stabbed by Brian with a shank. Arturo Braga is portrayed by John Ortiz. Having appeared in the fourth and sixth films, Braga is the first villain of the franchise to appear in multiple films.

Film appearances

- Fast & Furious
- Fast & Furious 6 (cameo)

==== Fénix Calderón ====
Fénix "Rise" Calderón was Braga's right-hand man who was responsible for apparently murdering Letty in Fast & Furious. However, Letty is shown alive in Fast & Furious 6 and it is revealed that Fenix had chosen to shoot the gas tank of her vehicle out of sympathy in an attempt to let her live, most likely out of respect for her driving skills. In the climatic chase through the tunnels, he T-bones Brian's Subaru, causing him to crash. When Brian crawls out of the car, Fénix kicks him a few times and is about to shoot when Dominic comes out of the tunnel and impales him with a camaro, killing him.

Fénix Calderón is portrayed by Laz Alonso.

Film appearances

- Fast & Furious
- Fast & Furious 6 (flashback)

Cars driven

- 1972 Ford Gran Torino, fourth film

==== Ramon Campos ====
Ramon Campos was Braga's double and a recruiter for drivers in the shipment of drugs in and out of Los Angeles. Ramon Campos is portrayed by Robert Miano.

Film appearances

- Fast & Furious

=== Antagonists introduced in Fast Five ===
==== Hernán Reyes ====
Hernán Reyes is a corrupt businessman and ruthless Brazilian drug lord who provides resources to the favelas in Rio de Janeiro to gain control over them. He also has most of the Rio civil and military police and local division of the Brazilian federal highway police (PRF) on his payroll, which allows him to later hide his money inside a vault in their evidence room. He wants Toretto and O'Conner dead when they plot to steal his money, even indiscriminately killing Hobbs' escort when they have Dom's crew in custody, causing a vengeful Hobbs to join Dom's effort. Towards the end of the movie, Reyes pursues Dom's crew with his men with the corrupt police force, though Dom smashes his Dodge Charger into Reyes' Volkswagen Touareg, chassis first, wounding him badly. As he crawls out of the car and begs for Hobbs' help, Hobbs shoots him dead in retribution. Hernán Reyes is portrayed by Joaquim de Almeida.

In Fast X, Hernan's son Dante, seeks to avenge the loss of his father and family fortune at both Dom and his family's hands.

Film appearances

- Fast Five
- Fast X

==== Zizi ====
Zizi is a lead henchman for Hernán Reyes. He enlists Vince, who brings Brian, Mia, and Dominic, to help him steal three confiscated cars off a moving train. However, when Mia drives the GT40 away from the intended destination, he turns on Dominic and Brian, shooting the DEA agents in the process. He also leads the ambush on Hobbs' convoy, killing most of Hobbs' team before his hit squad is wiped out by Toretto, Brian, and Vince, allowing them, Hobbs, Mia, and Elena to escape. Towards the end of the film, he is shot and killed by Brian when he tries to kill Dominic. Zizi is portrayed by Michael Irby.

Film appearances

- Fast Five

Cars driven

- 2002 Volkswagen Touareg, fifth film

=== Antagonists introduced in Fast & Furious 6 ===
==== Owen Shaw ====
Owen Shaw is a mercenary and criminal mastermind. Having formerly served in the British SAS at the rank of major, Shaw has assembled a team of mercenaries, including Letty, to rob high-tech devices worth billions in the black market in Fast & Furious 6. He was hired by Cipher to steal parts and assemble them to make "Nightshade", which can shut down power to any country. This brings him into conflict with Luke Hobbs, who recruits Dom and his team to hunt Shaw down. While trying to escape on the plane with the chip, Dom stops him, and Shaw is thrown out of the plane before it crashes. It is also revealed during the film that he was working with Fast & Furious main antagonist Arturo Braga, having helped the latter escape custody and hide his true identity, making him the overarching antagonist of that film.

In Furious 7, it is revealed that Shaw survived his injuries but is still in a coma.

In The Fate of the Furious, Shaw is shown to have fully recovered and is rescued from prison by his mother, thanks to information from Dom. Owing Dom, Owen and Deckard team up in saving Dominic's baby son from Cipher aboard her plane.

Owen Shaw is portrayed by Luke Evans. Originally the role was earmarked for Jason Statham, who would later join the franchise in the sequel as Hattie and Owen's older brother Deckard Shaw, making him the middle child.

Lin describes him as "an antagonist that's worthy of Dominic Toretto" and "that had the opposite philosophy to Dom. Dom often goes with trusting his gut, whereas Shaw is more about the analytics where there is no room for weakness."

Film appearances

- Fast & Furious 6
- Furious 7 (cameo)
- The Fate of the Furious (cameo)
- Hobbs & Shaw (cameo; young Owen portrayed by Harry Hickles)

Cars driven

- Flip Car (One-seated, open-wheeled sports car similar to a cross of a dune buggy and a Formula car), sixth film
- 2005 Aston Martin DB9, sixth film
- 2013 Mercedes-Benz G-Class, sixth film

==== Agent Riley Hicks ====
Riley Hicks was a member of Hobbs' team, presumably helping him and Dom's team try to take down Shaw and his team of mercenaries. However unbeknownst to them, she is actually a double agent that secretly helps Shaw and the others escape custody. Near the end of the film, Dominic's team and Hobbs discover Riley's true allegiance to Shaw as his second-in-command and lover. She engages in a second fight with Letty aboard the cargo plane and is eventually killed after Letty shoots her out of the plane using a harpoon gun given to her by Hobbs himself. Riley is portrayed by Gina Carano.

Film appearances

- Fast & Furious 6

==== Vegh ====
Vegh is a female assassin in Shaw's team. She is his right-hand woman and one of the two drivers for the flip cars. She and Klaus both play an important role in kidnapping Mia. Vegh is killed by Brian by having her crash her car into an airline bumper. She is portrayed by Clara Paget.

Film appearances

- Fast & Furious 6

Cars driven

- Flip Car (Three-seated, open-wheeled sports car similar to a dune buggy), sixth film

==== Klaus ====
Klaus is a body builder and the strongman in Shaw's team, but also a hacker with ease, disabling Tej and Roman cars. He is the one who kidnapped Mia as leverage so Shaw could be freed. He is knocked out by Dom and Hobbs during a fight aboard the cargo plane and is killed in the plane's fiery crash. Klaus is portrayed by Kim Kold.

Film appearances

- Fast & Furious 6

==== Jah ====
Jah is a cold blooded killer in Shaw's team who uses his martial arts and parkour to battle both Han and Roman, beating them up with ease. He is killed along with Denlinger when Tej rams their vehicle into the cargo plane's crosswind. Jah is portrayed by Joe Taslim.

Film appearances

- Fast & Furious 6

Cars driven

- 2007 Range Rover, sixth film

==== Denlinger ====
Denlinger is a member of Shaw's crew, acting mainly as driver and he is a jeep support during the tank heist. He is killed along with Jah when Tej rams their vehicle into the cargo plane's crosswind. Denlinger is portrayed by Samuel M. Stewart.

Film appearances

- Fast & Furious 6

==== Adolfson ====
Adolfson is a member of Shaw's team, acting as sniper and infiltrator. He dies after Han throws him into one of the cargo plane's jet engines, after Gisele sacrifices herself to stop him from hurting Han. Adolfson is portrayed by Benjamin Davies.

Film appearances

- Fast & Furious 6

Cars driven

- 2007 Range Rover, sixth film

==== Oakes ====
Oakes is a former member of Shaw's team, who is captured by Interpol. Hobbs came to confront him in the Interpol interrogation room. Oakes defiantly refuses to cooperate, which results in him getting badly beaten up and left in a trashed out interrogation room by Hobbs. He is killed by Shaw in London for betraying him, giving him a bag with a bomb inside it. Oakes is portrayed by Matthew Stirling.

Film appearances

- Fast & Furious 6

==== Ivory ====
Ivory is a member of Shaw's team. During a shootout at one of Shaw's hideouts, Ivory attempts to flee on motorcycle, but is shot dead by Gisele. Ivory is portrayed by David Ajala.

Film appearances

- Fast & Furious 6

==== Firuz ====
Firuz is a mechanic in London, who provides Shaw's team with the flips cars and the harpoon guns. He is killed when Ivory and Jah shoot up his garage in an attempt to kill Gisele and Riley. Firuz is portrayed by Thure Lindhardt.

Film appearances

- Fast & Furious 6

=== Antagonists introduced in Furious 7 ===
==== Mose Jakande ====
Mose Jakande was a Nigerian born terrorist who led a Private Military Base. He is powerful and violent, with no allegiance to anyone. He is hired by Cipher to capture the hacker known as Ramsey, who has created a device called God's Eye, which can find anyone on Earth. He teams up with Deckard Shaw in order to take on Dominic and his team after they rescue Ramsey from his henchmen, but soon turns on Shaw when faced with a chance to take out Toretto during a fight between the two men on top of a car park in LA. He is killed in the ending climactic scene after Dom plants Deckard Shaw's bag of grenades on his helicopter, which Hobbs shoots, destroying the helicopter with Jakande still inside.

In The Fate of the Furious, Jakande's photo is shown and his recruitment by Cipher to capture the God's Eye and Ramsey is revealed. Mose Jakande is portrayed by Djimon Hounsou.

Film appearances

- Furious 7

==== Louis Kiet ====
Louis Kiet is Jakande's henchman. A powerful martial artist, he fights Brian when the latter's team tries to hijack the convoy in the mountains, and defeats him, leaving him and the bus to fall over a steep cliff. In LA, he encounters and fights Brian once more, but is killed when Brian knocks a reeling piece attached to a rope wrapped on his feet, which pulls him down a shaft to his death. Kiet is portrayed by martial artist and stunt coordinator Tony Jaa.

Film appearances

- Furious 7

==== Kara ====
Kara is the leader of an all-female bodyguard team protecting a billionaire Jordanian prince. During a party at Abu Dhabi, she fights Letty one-on-one, but is knocked out long enough for Letty to escape with Roman. Kara is portrayed by former UFC Fighter and current professional wrestler Ronda Rousey.

Film appearances

- Furious 7

=== Antagonists introduced in The Fate of the Furious ===
==== Cipher ====
Cipher is a criminal mastermind and cyberterrorist who blackmails Dominic Toretto into working against his allies by kidnapping Dom and Elena's son Brian Marcos, as well as Elena Neves herself. It is subsequently revealed that she was the one who hired Owen Shaw to steal the Nightshade device and also hired Mose Jakande to steal the God's Eye. She plans to hijack a Russian nuclear submarine and then fire one of its missiles into the air, claiming that she will gain control over the world's superpowers by doing this. After Dom defies her during a mission in New York City, Cipher lets her right hand man Connor Rhodes kill Elena and threatens Dom's son next. Her plans are soon foiled by Dom and his crew and Dom's son is rescued by Deckard Shaw, who arrives to the front of the plane to confront Cipher, but she survives by jumping out of the plane. It is mentioned at the end by Mr. Nobody that Cipher is still at large and is rumored to be hiding in Athens, though she will not have the power to nuke any cities anytime soon thanks to Dom and his crew.

Cipher returns in F9 as the secondary antagonist, where it is revealed that she had been arrested by Mr. Nobody and his forces, though rogue agents rescue her. She is later captured by rogue covert operative Otto and Dom's younger brother Jakob Toretto, and after unsuccessfully attempting to sway Jakob to work with her, gives them the location of the final piece of Project Aries, a device that can hack into any computer weapons system. However, Otto and Cipher form a secret alliance and begin working together, with both planning to double-cross Jakob. During the final battle, Cipher escapes in defeat one more time after the final battle when Dom causes a truck to crash into the computer simulated drone/magnetic F-22 Raptor jet intended to kill Dom, causing it to not only burst into flames, but also accidentally killing Otto in the process.

Cipher returns in Fast X, where her henchmen have turned against her after they were blackmailed by Dante. She later goes to Dom's house to warn him and Letty that Dante is coming after them before she is taken into custody by Little Nobody. Towards the end of the film, she is sent to the same hospital prison as Letty, where the two subsequently engage in a fight, but work together to escape. After it is revealed that they are in Antarctica, both are rescued by a mysterious woman later revealed to be Gisele Yashar.

Cipher is portrayed by Charlize Theron. Although she is the main antagonist of The Fate of the Furious, she was revealed as the behind the scenes mastermind of Fast & Furious 6 and Furious 7, having hired and used Owen Shaw and Mose Jakande as pawns to succeed in her goals, making her the entire franchise's overarching antagonist.

Film appearances

- The Fate of the Furious
- F9
- Fast X

Vehicles driven

- computer-simulated F-22 Raptor with magnetic, ninth film
- 2024 DeLorean Alpha5, tenth film

==== Connor Rhodes ====
Connor Rhodes is the ruthless right-hand man and second-in-command of Cipher. Cipher lets him kill Elena after Dom defied her during the heist in New York. When Rhodes tries to shoot Letty from afar, Dom rebels against Cipher and kills him by breaking his neck, stating this was for Elena. Connor Rhodes portrayed by Kristofer Hivju.

Film appearances

- The Fate of the Furious

Cars driven

- 2011 Toyota FJ Cruiser, eighth film

=== Antagonists introduced in Fast & Furious Presents: Hobbs & Shaw ===
==== Brixton Lore ====
Brixton Lore is a cyber-genetically enhanced terrorist working for the organization Eteon. He was previously a field agent with MI6 and a colleague of Deckard until he was approached by Eteon. Brixton attempted to recruit Deckard into the terrorist organization, which led to Deckard shooting him, but he survived with Eteon's aid. He is assigned by Eteon to secure the Snowflake virus and nearly wipes out an MI6 team attempting to retrieve it, but one agent, Hattie, survives, and injects herself with the virus before escaping. In pursuing Hattie, Brixton comes into conflict again with Deckard, as well as Hobbs, as the unlikely allies look to prevent Eteon from acquiring Snowflake. He ultimately engages Hobbs and Shaw in a fight, which ends with Hobbs and Deckard overpowering him. Following his defeat, he is remotely terminated by Eteon's director. Brixton is portrayed by Idris Elba.

Film appearances

- Hobbs & Shaw

==== Eteon's Director ====
Eteon's Director is the shadow leader of Eteon. He was the one who recruited Brixton Lore for Eteon and when he sent Brixton to try to also recruit Deckard Shaw, Brixton was shot by Shaw and near death, only surviving by the cybernetic implants installed in his body by the Director's orders. After Shaw's refusal to join him, the Director used his influence on the British government and the media to frame Shaw for murder as revenge. Years later, the Director orders Brixton to recover the Snowflake virus that was created by professor Andreiko from MI6 agent Hattie Shaw, but he failed and have to use Eteon's influence of the media to lure Hattie out of hiding by framing her as a rogue agent. When Hobbs and Shaw begin their search for Hattie, the Director orders Brixton to try recruit the pair, even after what happened with Shaw years before. After Brixton loses the virus and fails to defeat Hobbs and Shaw in the final battle, the Director decides to terminate him for not living up to Eteon's expectations and talks to Hobbs, Shaw and Hattie by threatening them that he will convince them to join Eteon, especially Hobbs with whom he has a past connection. Eteon's Director is voiced by Ryan Reynolds.

Film appearances

- Hobbs & Shaw

=== Antagonists introduced in F9 ===
==== Otto ====
Otto is the son of a prime minister from an indeterminate country, a rogue covert operative who was working with his enforcer and right hand man Lieutenant Sue to lead his own private army and Cipher to steal Project Aries. Otto regroups back at his base of operations and recruits Cipher. Otto compromises the safe house and frees Dom's younger brother Jakob Toretto, while Jakob reveals that he was the one that betrayed Mr. Nobody. Otto and Jakob then kidnap Elle and take the second part of project Aries.

Otto has a satellite launch into Orbit, while Jakob has Elle activate the Aries device, as they wait for the satellite to activate, as they are moving throughout Tbilisi in an armored Mercedes-Benz Unimog (aka The Armadillo), Dom, Letty, Mia, Ramsey and Han give chase and try to rescue Elle and stop them from uploading the satellite uplink and double crosses Jakob as he is now working with Cipher, but he is accidentally killed by her, who is flying a computer simulator jet to attack the team. Otto is portrayed by Thue Ersted Rasmussen.

Film appearances

- F9

Cars driven

- 2019 Jaguar XE SV Project 8, ninth film

==== Lieutenant Sue ====
Lieutenant Sue is a brutish enforcer and the right-hand man of Otto who served as the field commander of Otto's private army. He is killed by Letty when she uses the magnet attached to her car and throws it at Sue, crushing him. Lieutenant Sue is portrayed by Martyn Ford.

Film appearances

- F9

==== Kenny Linder ====
Kenny Linder is a former stock race driver. During the last stock car race of the season in 1989, Linder bumped into Jack Toretto and caused him to die in a violent crash. A week following the accident, Linder was attacked by Jack's son Dominic, who bashed him repeatedly with a wrench in a fit of uncontrolled rage. Linder suffered severe injuries to the left side of his face and, as a result of these injuries, could never drive again. He later found work at a high school as a janitor and commuted to work on a bus. It is revealed in F9 that the reason Dom hit him was because Linder insulted his dad and punched him. Kenny Linder is portrayed by Jim Parrack.

Film appearances

- F9

=== Antagonists introduced in Fast X ===
==== Dante Reyes ====
Dante Reyes is the son of the fallen Brazilian kingpin Hernan Reyes who wants to exact revenge against Dom and his family for his father's death, the theft of his organization's money and the end of his family's control over the Rio de Janeiro underworld. In order to do this, Dante attacks Cipher's base and blackmails her men into turning against her and working with him, threatening otherwise to kill their families.

After Dom's team is seemingly assigned a mission in Rome, it is revealed to be a trap by Dante, who has placed bombs within the team's trucks in an attempt to kill them. After the team manages to get rid of the bombs by rolling them through the city, Dante has the team framed for the attack before meeting Dom in Rio de Janeiro, where he challenges him to a race. Dante wins, but has implemented bombs into the other two cars containing Dom's friends Diogo and Isabel, forcing Dom to choose who he will save. Later on, Dante attacks the vehicle Aimes has apprehended Dom in, but it is revealed to be another trap as he has kidnapped Isabel. Managing to obtain God's Eye, Dante later tracks Jakob Toretto and Dom's son Little B to Portugal, where he manages to kidnap the latter, but not before he is rescued by Dom. When Dom and Little B manage to escape two semi-trucks sent to kill them by driving off of a dam, Dante reveals that he had been anticipating that and has placed bombs at the bottom of the dam to kill both of them. Dante Reyes is portrayed by Jason Momoa.

Film appearances

- Fast X

==== Agent Aimes ====
Agent Aimes is the new leader of Mr. Nobody's agency. After the events in Rome, Aimes launches an international manhunt for Dom and his crew, believing that they are responsible for the city's destruction. Though Aimes later manages to apprehend Dom, they are attacked by Dante's men, and the two begin to form an alliance. However, towards the end of the film, Aimes is revealed to have been working for Dante the entire time after he shoots down a plane containing Roman, Tej, Ramsey, and Han, seemingly killing them. Aimes is portrayed by Alan Ritchson.

Film appearances

- Fast X

== Law enforcement officials and federal agents ==
=== Government agents introduced in The Fast and the Furious ===
==== Agent Bilkins ====
Bilkins is an FBI agent who was seen in The Fast and the Furious and 2 Fast 2 Furious. He is Brian's former boss while he was in the LAPD. Bilkins is shown to have doubts about Brian in The Fast and the Furious. He also complained at Brian's car being destroyed at the hands of Johnny Tran and Lance Nguyen. In 2 Fast 2 Furious, Bilkins showed more sympathy towards Brian than Markham. When he came to Barstow with Brian, Bilkins manages to convince Roman to help Customs catch Verone in exchange of their criminal record being cleaned. Bilkins is portrayed by Thom Barry.

Film appearances

- The Fast and the Furious
- 2 Fast 2 Furious

Cars driven

- 1998 Mercury Grand Marquis (second film).

==== Sergeant Tanner ====
Tanner is an LAPD officer in charge of the undercover operation in The Fast and the Furious, which Brian is assigned to solve. He serves as a father figure to Brian during the operation. He also financed $80,000 to buy Brian's car for the mission, which was destroyed by Johnny Tran and Lance Nguyen. Tanner is portrayed by Ted Levine.

Film appearances

- The Fast and the Furious

=== Government agents introduced in 2 Fast 2 Furious ===
==== Agent Markham ====
Markham is a U.S. Customs agent responsible for taking down drug kingpin Carter Verone in 2 Fast 2 Furious. Markham initially opposes the inclusion of Brian and his partner Roman Pearce in the undercover sting operation. During the film, Markham shows no trust in Brian and Roman to the point of nearly blowing their cover during the first part of their mission. However, the duo gain his trust after stopping Verone from fleeing the country. Markham is portrayed by James Remar.

Film appearances

- 2 Fast 2 Furious

Cars driven

- 1995 Ford Crown Victoria Undercover Police Car.

==== Monica Fuentes ====
Agent Monica Fuentes is a U.S. Customs (ICE) federal agent. Monica has been working undercover as an assistant for drug kingpin Carter Verone for nearly a year when Brian and Roman are brought in. She falls in love with Brian, but earns Roman's mistrust. Monica later warns Brian that after the mission Verone has assigned them, he intends to kill them. She blows her cover by telling Brian about the airstrip, being the only person Verone notified about it. She is then taken captive aboard his private yacht, but Brian and Roman jump their Camaro onto the boat, saving Monica and capturing Verone. After Miami, Brian and Monica go their separate ways.

In the mid-credits scene of Fast Five, Hobbs receives a file from Monica regarding a robbery, in which Letty's photograph is attached, revealing that she is still alive, and is involved with the military convoy robbery in Berlin. In Fast X, Monica is revealed to be one of Dante Reyes' targets from his vision board. Monica is portrayed by Eva Mendes.

Film appearances

- 2 Fast 2 Furious
- Fast Five (cameo)

=== Government agents introduced in Fast & Furious ===
==== Agent Richard Penning ====
Richard Penning is a Supervisory Special Agent (SSA) for the FBI field office in Los Angeles, California. He is Brian's supervisor and one of the leaders of the team of federal agents looking to take down drug lord Arturo Braga. Penning is portrayed by Jack Conley.

Film appearances

- Fast & Furious

==== Agent Sophie Trinh ====
Sophie Trinh is an FBI agent who assists Brian in tracking down Braga. She also helps him acquire a Nissan Skyline GT-R R34 SpecV from a local impound for his mission. Sophie is portrayed by Liza Lapira.

Film appearances

- Fast & Furious

==== Agent Michael Stasiak ====
Michael Stasiak is an FBI agent who is at odds with Brian. During an altercation over Brian interrupting Stasiak's interrogation of Mia, Brian shoves Stasiak's face against the wall, breaking his nose. In turn, Stasiak later ruins a sting operation Brian had set up to take down drug lord Arturo Braga and have Dominic Toretto pardoned for his past crimes. He returns in Fast & Furious 6, where he covertly helps Brian enter a prison under a fake alias in order to obtain information from Braga, who had a connection to Owen Shaw. As a means to get himself locked in solitary to get closer to Braga, Brian once again breaks Stasiak's nose. Stasiak reappears in F9, still sporting his broken nose while debriefing Toretto's team after their failed mission in Montequinto. Stasiak is portrayed by Shea Whigham.

Film appearances

- Fast & Furious
- Fast & Furious 6
- F9

Cars driven

- 1998 Ford Crown Victoria Undercover Police Car (sixth film)

=== Government agents introduced in Fast Five ===
==== Elena Neves ====
Officer Elena Neves was a member of the Rio military police (PMERJ) assigned to Hobbs' DSS team to track down Dom and Brian for killing three DEA agents. She was chosen because of her knowledge of the favelas and the fact that she was the only incorruptible officer. Her police officer husband's death had motivated her to join the force, and as such, she does not work under Reyes.

In Fast Five, when Dom saved her from a shootout in the favelas orchestrated by Reyes to prevent the theft of his drug money, she starts to believe they are innocent of killing the DEA agents. Elena later assisted Hobbs in aiding Dom and Brian in stealing Hernan Reyes's cash supply and started a relationship with Dom after the job was done.

In Fast & Furious 6, upon discovering that Dom's wife, Letty, was still alive and currently working for Owen Shaw, Elena encouraged Dom to find her by joining Hobbs, saying that, if there was a chance that her husband were still alive, she would take it. She assisted Dom's younger sister Mia when Owen Shaw's crew attacked them and took care of Mia and Brian O'Conner's son Jack O'Conner during Mia's kidnapping.

In Furious 7, After Letty was successfully convinced to rejoin Dom, Elena joined the DSS as Hobbs' new partner to let the couple live together. Elena was present at the DSS HQ to check on Hobbs, and as she headed home, Hobbs gave her a letter of recommendation for her request to join Interpol. When Owen Shaw's older brother Deckard Shaw breaks into the HQ to hack Hobbs's computer to find out more information about Dom and his crew as part of his revenge plan against them for putting Owen Shaw in a coma condition, she assisted Hobbs in an attempt to bring him down. Hobbs is left injured, so Elena informs Dom to visit him as she takes care of Hobbs's daughter, Samantha Hobbs. Because of her looking after Luke Hobbs at the hospital and his daughter Samantha Hobbs for her necessities, she did not join Dom and his crew in stopping mercenary and terrorist Mose Jakande in rescuing hacker Ramsey and activating God's Eye.

In The Fate of the Furious, she was later kidnapped by cyberterrorist Cipher in order to blackmail Dom into abandoning his family and retrieve nuclear launch codes, after it was revealed that Dom had fathered a child named Brian Marcos with Elena in Letty's absence. After Dom fails to retrieve the launch codes from Letty after an encounter in New York City, Cipher lets her right-hand man and second-in-command, Connor Rhodes execute Elena by shooting her in the head in cold blood. Dom later avenges Elena's death by killing Rhodes by breaking his neck and promises to her that their son will always be safe. She is a main character in Fast Five and a supporting character in Fast & Furious 6, Furious 7 and The Fate of the Furious. She is also mentioned twice in F9 (though not by name) - first when Roman tries to convince Dom to join them in their search for the main device of Project Aries and Cipher, incorrectly reminding him that it was Cipher who had killed her; and next in the final scene when Letty tells Dom and Elena's now-toddler son, Brian Marcos, that his mother will always be watching over him from heaven.

While not appearing in the current-day events with Fast X, due to it having archival footage of the previous films, during the events of the fifth film, Elena joined Luke at the Brazilian police station with Brian and Dom's attempt to steal a vault for their heist, introducing the tenth film's villain, Dante, the son of Hernan Reyes. Cipher arrived at Dom's house in L.A. and Dom's response to Cipher for Elena's death in the eighth film is shown. In the same film, Elena is mentioned by her sister Isabel Neves to Dom in Rio about her story.

Elena is portrayed by Elsa Pataky.

Film appearances

- Fast Five
- Fast & Furious 6
- Furious 7
- The Fate of the Furious
- Fast X (flashbacks)

Cars driven

- GURKHA Armored Vehicle, fifth film
- Ford Escape, seventh film

==== Wilkes ====
Wilkes was a DSS federal agent. He was on Luke Hobbs' team whose job was to apprehend Dominic Toretto and Brian O'Conner. After apprehending Dom, Brian, Mia and Vince, the convoy is ambushed by Hernan Reyes' henchmen, led by Zizi. One of them fires a rocket at Wilkes' vehicle, killing him and Macroy; every DSS agent is taken out with the exception of Hobbs. Agent Wilkes is portrayed by Fernando Chien.

Film appearances

- Fast Five

Cars driven

- GURKHA Armored Vehicle, fifth film

==== Macroy ====
Macroy was a DSS federal agent and a part of Luke Hobbs' team tasked with apprehending Dominic Toretto and Brian O'Conner. He was also tasked with reassembling a Ford GT40. He met his end when Zizi along with Reyes' other henchmen killed him in an ambush by blowing up Wilkes' vehicle. The other agents were gunned down as well, Hobbs being the only DSS agent to survive. Agent Macroy is portrayed by Geoff Meed.

Film appearances

- Fast Five

==== Fusco ====
Fusco was a DSS federal agent and member of Luke Hobbs' team and helps disassemble and consequently reassemble the stolen car in the hope of finding what is missing and finding a lead on the whereabouts of Dominic and his team. Fusco is present during the subsequent chase and kills Reyes' hit men alongside his fellow agents. He accompanies Hobbs to the 'meeting' with Toretto and after being threatened by Dom's fellow Brazilian street racers he and the team leave, but not before Tej places a tracking device on the agents' truck. After the tracking signal is reversed Fusco and the rest of Hobbs team turn up at the garage to arrest Dom, Mia, Brian and Vince.

On their way to the airport, however, they were suddenly ambushed by Reyes men, led by Zizi. One of them fires a rocket-propelled projectile at Fusco's vehicle, sending it hurling off the road. As he lies injured, three grenades are suddenly thrown aside him as Hobbs watches on helplessly. He casts a final glance at his boss before they explode, killing him in the blast. Agent Fusco is portrayed by Alimi Ballard.

Film appearances

- Fast Five

Cars driven

- GURKHA Armored Vehicle, fifth film

==== Chato ====
Chato was a DSS federal agent. He was a member of Luke Hobbs' team, tasked with capturing Dominic Toretto and his crew. He was killed during an ambush by Zizi and his men when he was rushing to help a wounded Hobbs. Agent Chato is portrayed by Yorgo Constantine.

Film appearances

- Fast Five

Cars driven

- GURKHA Armored Vehicle, fifth film

=== Government agents introduced in Furious 7 ===
==== Mr. Nobody ====
Mr. Nobody is a government agent and the leader of an unknown covert ops team, which includes Dom's younger brother, Jakob Toretto. Because of Jakob, Mr. Nobody takes a notice of Dom and his team during the events of Fast & Furious, Fast Five, and Fast & Furious 6, leading him to wanting to recruit the team in helping to capture Mose Jakande, a mercenary and terrorist coveting the God's Eye, a program capable of tracking a specific individual using anything on a digital network, and its creator, Ramsey. Beforehand, he had worked with Gisele during her time with Mossad and would convince Han Lue to work for him following her death, due to her trust in him. Han agrees to become his agent and would help with protecting Project Aries and a young girl named Elle in connection to it, after Jakob went rogue.

In Furious 7, with request from Luke Hobbs, he approaches and convinces Dom to assist him in capturing Jakande, collecting the God's Eye, and rescuing its creator, Ramsey, whom has been captured by Jakande and his forces. After getting the God's Eye and saving Ramsey, Mr. Nobody upholds his end of the bargain, despite not capturing Jakande, and helps Dom in finding Jakande and his militants, only to be ambushed by Jakande and his mercenaries. Wounded in the fight and losing most of his men, he tells Dom to move on without him and stop Jakande while he is evacuated for medical treatment.

In The Fate of the Furious, Mr. Nobody approaches Hobbs after his arrest in Germany and offers to get him out if he joins his covert ops unit, which Hobbs refuses. After staging a prison riot that allows for Hobbs and Deckard Shaw to escape, he recruits them to go after Dom and Cipher. During a meeting with the team, he reveals that Cipher was the one who hired Owen Shaw and Mose Jakande, which is why she has taken an interest in the group, as they have interfered in her business twice. They are then attacked by Cipher and Dom (who is secretly being blackmailed), who steal the God's Eye. Mr. Nobody equips the team with the means to track them down and sends his protégé, Little Nobody, to go with them. At the end of the film, Mr. Nobody and Little Nobody remain to celebrate with the team in New York, promising to keep searching for Cipher.

He is referenced in Hobbs & Shaw when CIA Agent Leob informs Shaw that Mr. Nobody is a mutual associate of theirs when requesting Deckard Shaw's aid in finding a missing rogue MI6 agent.

In F9, Mr. Nobody has arrested Cipher, after two years of searching for her, and taken her aboard his plane to be brought back to the US. He also has in possession half of "Project Aries", which Cipher has been looking for. But the plane was attacked and crashed in Montequinto, Guatemala by Jakob Toretto in an ambush, who has taken Cipher but not Project Aries, which was his true target. It is unknown if Mr. Nobody survived or was killed in the crash.

Mr. Nobody is portrayed by Kurt Russell. Originally referred to as Frank Petty several weeks before the premiere, he was later noted to just be Mr. Nobody when Russell was interviewed on Jimmy Kimmel Live. His real name is unknown.

Film appearances

- Furious 7
- The Fate of the Furious
- F9

==== Agent Sheppard ====
Sheppard is Mr. Nobody's assistant and a tactical leader and member of his covert ops team. He was the one who helps and assists Dominic Toretto and his crew for their rescue of Ramsey from mercenary and terrorist Mose Jakande and also participates in the infiltration to find and stop Jakande and his militants. Sheppard is killed by Jakande during a shootout, leaving the God's Eye to be taken by Jakande. Mr. Nobody avenges his death by killing several of Jakande's men, although Luke Hobbs would be the one who truly avenges Sheppard's death by killing Jakande himself in the film's climax. Sheppard is portrayed by John Brotherton.

Film appearances

- Furious 7

=== Government agents introduced in The Fate of the Furious ===
==== Little Nobody ====
Eric Reisner is a law enforcement agent working under Mr. Nobody. In the film he is referred to as "Little Nobody". He first visited Luke Hobbs along with Mr. Nobody at the jail where Luke was being imprisoned, where they had a brief fight that was later reassured by Mr. Nobody. When Dom's team is reunited after his betrayal, Eric is in charge of introducing Cipher and how dangerous she was, in addition to revealing that she was using Owen Shaw and Mose Jakande. After they are attacked by Dom and Cipher, Eric recovered a plan to capture Dom in which he takes them to a secret base where several vehicles of agencies are guarded. During the plan and persecution of Toretto, his car was trapped after crashing against bars from a construction site.

When the group learns that Dom is planning to assault to a Russian base which carries a Nuclear Submarine that Cipher plans to use, Little Nobody decides to move away from the agency's rules and allow Dom's team to use their own rules.

When Dom's son is brought in by Deckard, Mr. Nobody and Little Nobody appear to congratulate them and offer Hobbs an opportunity to return to work for the law, to which this time Little Nobody treats him with more respect and friendship. He does not appear in F9, but returns in Fast X, where he continued to work for the Agency and assisted Dom's crew in Rome when they were framed for a terrorist attack by Dante Reyes. He is portrayed by Scott Eastwood.

Film appearances

- The Fate of the Furious
- Fast X

Cars driven

- 2013 Subaru BRZ, eighth film
- 2016 Subaru WRX STI, eighth film

=== Government agents introduced in Fast & Furious Presents: Hobbs & Shaw ===
==== Hattie Shaw ====
Hattie Shaw is an MI6 field agent, daughter of Queenie and younger sister of Deckard and Owen. She was much closer to her brother Deckard than Owen when they were children, but they became estranged when Hattie was falsely led to believe that Deckard betrayed his black ops team. During a mission to retrieve the Snowflake virus from the terrorist organization Eteon, Hattie is forced to inject herself with the virus and go on the run when her team is massacred by genetically enhanced Eteon operative Brixton Lore. Her efforts to extract the virus from her body leads to her joining forces with Hobbs and Shaw as they work together to evade Brixton and prevent Eteon from obtaining Snowflake. With help from Hobbs and Shaw, she is able to remove the virus and secure it as the three defeat Brixton. She also repairs her relationship with her brother when she learns he was set up and begins to form a romantic bond with Hobbs. Hattie Shaw is portrayed by Vanessa Kirby and young Hattie is portrayed by Meesha Garbett.

Film appearances

- Hobbs & Shaw

Cars driven

- MAN KAT1, Hobbs & Shaw

=== Government agents introduced in Fast X ===
==== Tess ====
Tess is Mr. Nobody's daughter. After Aimes is placed in charge of The Agency and launches a manhunt for Dom and his crew following the events in Rome, Tess is convinced of their innocence and goes rogue in order to assist Dom, warning him about Dante and Aimes, while also going to aid an imprisoned Letty at the request of Dom. She later assists Dom during the events in Rio de Janeiro, but she is wounded by one of Dante's men before being taken to the hospital by Isabel. Tess is portrayed by Brie Larson.

Film appearances

- Fast X

Cars driven

- 2013 Nissan 370Z, tenth film
