= Torque (film) =

2004 film directed by Joseph Kahn

- Theatrical release poster
- Directed by: Joseph Kahn
- Written by: Matt Johnson
- Produced by: Brad Luff; Neal H. Moritz
- Starring: Martin Henderson; Ice Cube; Monet Mazur; Adam Scott; Matt Schulze; Jaime Pressly; Jay Hernandez
- Cinematography: Peter Levy
- Edited by: David Blackburn; Howard E. Smith
- Music by: Trevor Rabin
- Production companies: Village Roadshow Pictures; Original Film
- Distributed by: Warner Bros. Pictures
- Release date: January 16, 2004
- Running time: 84 minutes
- Country: United States
- Language: English
- Budget: $40 million
- Box office: $46.5 million

Torque is a 2004 American action film directed by Joseph Kahn (in his feature film directorial debut), written by Matt Johnson and produced by Neal H. Moritz. The film stars Martin Henderson, Ice Cube, Monet Mazur, Adam Scott, Matt Schulze, Jaime Pressly, and Jay Hernandez. Its plot follows Cary Ford, a biker discovers and stows away motorcycles filled with crystal meth, but a gangster, Henry James, has plans to recover his drugs. He frames Ford for the murder of his rival Trey's brother, who heads the Reapers, a biker gang. Ford goes on the run in an attempt to clear his name, while the FBI and multiple groups of motorcycle-mounted marauders chase after him.

Torque was theatrically released on January 16, 2004, in the United States by Warner Bros. Pictures. The film underperformed at the box office, grossing $46.5 million worldwide against production budget of $40 million, and received mixed-to-negative reviews from critics, with common criticisms regarding the screenplay and direction, though the action sequences were singled out for praise. It was nominated for several Taurus Awards for its stunts.

== Plot ==
Biker Cary Ford stops at a diner owned by his ex-girlfriend Shane. Later, Ford meets up with his best friends Dalton and Val. En route to a motorcycle party, they encounter the Reapers, a biker gang consisting of leader Trey and his brother Junior, who get into a scuffle with Ford.

At the party, Ford sees Shane, who is mad that he left. Biker gang the Hellions then pulls up. It includes leader Henry James, his girlfriend China and his right-hand man Luther. Henry is irate at Ford for stealing his bikes (which contain crystal meth). He gives Ford an ultimatum until sundown to return the bikes.

That night, Ford and his friends arrive at a nightclub where biker gangs hang out. The three gangs run into each other and cause a brawl. Scared, Junior runs into the bathroom to find the Hellions there. Junior apologizes to Henry for being unable to pay him back for a botched drug deal (which Trey refused to allow earlier) and begs Henry to give him time to work it out. Henry instead kills Junior. Ford, Shane and the two friends then spend the night at a motel.

At the murder scene, FBI agents Tehya Henderson and Jay McPherson assure Trey that they will find Junior's killer. China becomes a false witness and says that Ford killed Junior. Furious, Trey swears to kill Ford.

After learning that Ford is wanted for Junior's murder, Shane, Ford and company hit the road. The Reapers find them and a chase ensues with all riding into a forest. Ford tells his friends to split up, resulting in the chase being led near a passenger train. In the ensuing struggle, Trey falls in front of the train with his leg getting caught on the tracks. Ford saves Trey and gives him his own bike to escape, leaving Trey puzzled. Shane, Dalton, Val and Ford later find a cave to stay for the night.

Ford calls the FBI agents to tell them that he is innocent. McPherson picks up the phone and says that he does not believe Ford. However, Henderson does. The next morning, the four hitch a ride inside a truck, which is stopped by police checkpoint. Before the agents open the back of the truck, Ford and Shane bust out in a race car with the two friends on their bikes. The four drive onto a highway with the FBI and Trey on their tail.

Ford jumps onto Val's bike and tells him to ride with Shane. Trey and the two agents follow. The agents survive a crash where their Hummer hits a construction pipe. Trey rides his bike into Ford's, and the two crash. Holding Trey at gunpoint, Ford explains that he did not kill Junior. Trey asks who did it and Ford says that it was Henry and he set them both up. Trey agrees to partner with Ford as he sets up a meeting with the agents.

Ford calls Shane and orders his group to come and meet him and Trey at her garage. Subsequently, the agents bust in and tell Trey and Ford to get down. Henderson asks for an explanation, believing that Ford is innocent. As he tells them, McPherson shoots Henderson, apparently killing her. McPherson is Henry's mole in the agency and is working with the Hellions. Henry, China and Luther arrive with Dalton and Val in chains and Shane as a hostage. Ford says that Henry can take the bikes back. However, Henry wants to kill Ford and Trey (after admitting to Trey that he killed Junior).

Thereafter, a fight begins with Trey killing Luther. Henry and China leave the garage while Ford frees Shane and Trey unties Val and Dalton. Together, they leave the garage. Henderson (who was wearing a bullet proof vest) then blows up the garage, killing McPherson. Outside, China meets up with Shane. In the ensuing fight, Shane kills China.

Ford catches up with Henry in a bike chase. Henry shoots at Ford's bike, causing fuel to leak and ignite. Ford lands on top of Henry's bike as the fire catches up to them causing both bikes to explode; throwing Ford in the air and killing Henry. Shane picks him up and they return to the garage to find the others. Meanwhile, Henderson survived, but is injured.

Ford and Shane get back together and decide that the four need a vacation. Val picks up his girlfriend, and the five ride off in the desert.

== Cast ==
- Martin Henderson as Cary Ford, a biker who is framed for murder
- Ice Cube as Trey Wallace, leader of The Reapers who hated Ford for the framed murder of his brother, their member, but later, when he realized the truth, became an ally to Ford
- Monet Mazur as Shane, Ford's longtime girlfriend
- Adam Scott as FBI Agent Jay McPherson
- Matt Schulze as Henry James, leader of the Outlaw motorcycle club known as The Hellions, he is responsible for framing Ford and the film's antagonist
- Jay Hernandez as Dalton, Hispanic-American friend of Ford
- Will Yun Lee as Val, Korean-American friend of Ford
- Jaime Pressly as China, girlfriend of Henry James
- Max Beesley as Luther, second-in-command of The Hellions
- Christina Milian as Nina, Val's new fling and new friend of Ford
- Faizon Love as Sonny, member of The Reapers, drives a black Ford Excursion
- Fredro Starr as Junior Wallace, younger brother of Trey who is murdered
- Justina Machado as FBI Agent Tehya Henderson, partners with FBI Agent McPherson
- Hayden Mcfarland as Kho
- John Ashker as Yellow Acura RSX Driver, an unnamed street racer that gets into a fight with Ford after being outrun by him
- Lance Gilbert as 18 Wheeler Driver

=== Cameos ===
The hard rock band Monster Magnet appears in the nightclub playing the song "Master of Light". Dane Cook makes a cameo appearance as a tourist that runs into Henry. Jesse James of West Coast Choppers and Monster Garage makes a cameo appearance in the scene where Ford and Shane are talking inside the tent. Two of his custom choppers are used later in the movie as the bikes Henry James' drugs are stored in. Also, director Joseph Kahn can be spotted as a passenger during a train chase scene. Stuntman turned director Scott Waugh also makes a cameo appearance as the driver of the red Mitsubishi Eclipse. The Peterbilt 281 from Duel makes a cameo appearance chasing a Plymouth Valiant.

== Production ==
=== Soundtrack ===
The original score was done by Trevor Rabin. No official soundtrack was ever released. These are the songs contained in the film:

Track listing

No.	Title	Performer	Length
1.	"Someday"	Nickelback	3:15
2.	"True Nature"	Jane's Addiction	3:49
3.	"Forever"	Kid Rock	3:46
4.	"Lean Low"	YoungBloodZ	3:55
5.	"Out of Control"	Hoobastank	2:43
6.	"Master of Light"	Monster Magnet	4:44
7.	"Lapdance"	NERD	3:29
8.	"Fire and Flame"	Robbie McIntosh
9.	"Play It Loud"	MxPx	3:18
10.	"Yesterdays"	Pennywise	3:35
11.	"Push It"	Static-X	2:43

=== Similarities to The Fast and the Furious (2001) ===
The film has been called "The Fast and the Furious on Motorcycles", referring to the use of many of the same thematic elements between the two films. The film's director Joseph Kahn said his intention was to make a "piss take" version of the Fast & Furious franchise, even though both movies were produced by Neal H. Moritz. However, Torque was made by Warner Bros. Pictures, while The Fast and the Furious was made by Universal.

Torque specifically references The Fast and the Furious at one point, taking a line directly from the film. Henderson's character Ford borrows Vin Diesel's line, "I live my life a quarter-mile at a time." To which Shane (Monet Mazur) replies, "That is the dumbest thing I have ever heard."

Matt Schulze, who portrayed the film's antagonist, Henry James, also appeared in The Fast and the Furious, playing Dominic Toretto's childhood friend and member of the truck hijacking team, Vince. Schulze would later reprise his role as Vince in Fast Five, the fifth installment in the series that transitioned from street racing to an action-packed heist series.

Another reference to The Fast and the Furious is since Torque focused on motorcycles, it does show a street race in the beginning, involving a quarter-mile race between a Mitsubishi Eclipse and an Acura RSX, with the protagonist Cary Ford beating the 2 cars on his Aprilia RSV motorcycle. Also, when Ford rides past the road sign at the start of the film, it spins and reads "cars suck".

== Release ==
=== Box office ===
The film opened at #4 at the U.S. Box office raking in $9,970,557 USD in its first opening weekend. The movie's theatrical run took in a total of $21,215,059 in the United States and worldwide $46,546,197, against a production budget of approximately $40,000,000.

=== Reception ===
On the review aggregator website Rotten Tomatoes, 22% of 113 critics' reviews are positive, with an average rating of 4.3/10. The website's consensus reads: "Silly and noisy, Torque is stylish fun for the MTV crowd." Metacritic, which uses a weighted average, assigned the film a score of 41 out of 100, based on 29 critics, indicating "mixed or average" reviews.

A positive review came from Kevin Thomas of L.A. Times, calling it "A terrific action picture. Stylish unpretentious fun." Jeremy Wheeler at AllMovie rated Torque 3 stars out of 5 stating: "Torque is a shot of adrenaline straight to the heart, eliciting so many moments of amped-up and overblown excitement that those with medical conditions (and very serious taste in film) should probably stay ten blocks away.... this little slice of joy relishes in being abundantly over-the-top at every explosive turn."

The film has since gone on to acquire a cult following among sports-bike racers and enthusiasts, as well as racing film fans. It has also garnered some appreciation for its over-the-top stunts, fast pace and stylish action sequences.

=== Awards ===
Torque was nominated for several World Stunt Awards, including Best Specialty Stunt and Best Overall Stunt by a Stunt Man.

=== Home media ===
Torque was released on DVD and VHS on May 18, 2004. It was released on Blu-ray on April 22, 2014.
