= Russella =

- Occupations: dancer, actor, singer
- Years active: 2009–present
- Website: fabulousrussella.wix.com/fabulousrussella

Russella (also known as The Fabulous Russella) is a British actor, dancer, model, choreographer, singer and comedian often performing in character drag.

== Career ==
Russella is considered one of 200 cultural icons by i-D magazine and was considered one of the UK's top 30 talents by The London Paper

Russella studied dance at Northern School of Contemporary Dance in Leeds where he met singer and actress Paloma Faith. Russella later moved to London to live with Faith. Russella appeared in the music video for Faith's debut single Stone Cold Sober. Faith cites Russella as one of the inspirations for her style, a style which is thought of as Dynasty Glam and Alexis Carrington 1980s.

After moving to London, Russella worked in fashion PR for vintage clothes retailer Beyond Retro. before meeting performance artist Jonny Woo whom he performed with regularly after winning a competition hosted by Woo

After a chance meeting at London nightclub Madame Jojo's, a then unknown French singer Héloïse Letissier befriended Russella and two lesser known drag queens who encouraged her to sing. After a period of suffering from depression, Letissier was inspired by the drag queens—to the extent that she named her pop persona Christine and the Queens in appreciation. In an interview with the New Statesman, Letissier explains that whilst Russella taught her 'how to be a woman', the two have not remained in contact. Lettessier claims that Russella is one of the drag queens who 'saved [her] life'

== Modelling career ==
Even though Russella claims not to care about beauty "everyone is so obsessed with beauty and glamour right now; everyone wants to be perfect. I know I am perfect – I'm fabulous – but I don't particularly care. I just want to be looked at" – he has modelled for award-winning photographers including Nick Knight, Alice Hawkins Jodi Bieber and Gregoire A Meyer as well as modelling for brands including Joseph Corré's A Child of the Jago, and milliner Piers Atkinson. Russella has also appeared in photo shoots for magazines including i-D magazineAttitude Magazine, The Independent Magazine, The British Journal of Photography, and Time Out

== Acting career ==
Russella appeared as 'Terry Crystal' in Trevor Miller's film Riot on Redchurch Street which was released in 2012 He also featured on MTV's My Super Sweet 16 in January 2012 as guest choreographer.

== Comedy ==
In 2008 Russella launched 'London's Next Top Tranny' a successful competition to discover up and coming talent in East London

Russella was a finalist in the Hackney Empire New Act of the Year awards, 2012 hosted by Jo Brand

In 2015 Russella entered Britain's Got Talent performing 'The Pancake Show', and expressed his desire to 'do' a cookery book, much to the dismay of Simon Cowell but with the full support of David Walliams who exclaimed 'I would buy it!'

== Writing ==
Russella has contributed to online magazines including Societe Perrier and the Sabotage Times

== Singing ==
Russella released his first comedic single on to iTunes in 2009 – titled – 'Too Fabulous' with an accompanying video on YouTube which featured Sue Tilley Benefits Supervisor Sleeping. Too Fabulous was performed at Lovebox Festival in 2011

Russella also appeared on episode 6 of Britain's Got Talent 2012 singing Wild Horses

== Filmography ==
Feature films
Year	Title	Role	Notes
2012	Riot on Redchurch Street	Terry Crystal	Movie acting debut
Television roles
Year	Title	Role	Notes
2008	The Weakest Link	Russella	
2010	The Jonathan Ross Show	Peter Kay	
2010	The One Show	Marilyn Monroe	
2010	Britain's Ugliest Models	himself	
2012	My Super Sweet 16	choreographer	
2012	Britain's Got Talent	The Fabulous Russella	
2014	Toronto Song Project	Singer	
2015	Britain's Got Talent	The Fabulous Russella	
2016	Le France a un incroyable talent	The Fabulous Russella	
