= Matt Schulze =

American actor and musician

- Born: St. Louis, Missouri, U.S.
- Occupations: Actor; musician
- Years active: 1995–present

Matt Schulze is an American actor and musician. He is known for his role as Vince in The Fast and the Furious and Fast Five.

== Early life ==
Schulze was born in St. Louis, Missouri. He grew up in St. Louis. At age 16, he moved to Atlanta, where he had studied guitar at the Atlanta Institute of Music.

He moved back to St. Louis at age 17 and taught guitar for a year. He moved to Los Angeles in 1992 to be a studio musician, but ended up doing both modeling and acting.

== Career ==
Schulze made his big screen debut in 1998's action film Blade, as the character Crease. He was also in an episode of Charmed, titled "Dream Sorcerer", in which he went into the dreams of women and killed them. In 1999, Schulze was cast in a leading role in Woody Keith's film Dementia (1999 film). His next film was the teen comedy Boys and Girls, where he had a small role as Paul. In 2001, he starred in Downward Angel. The same year he also appeared in The Fast and the Furious. Schulze returned in Blade II playing Bloodpack vampire assassin Chupa, and in the same year Schulze was cast as another villain in The Transporter. In 2004, he appeared in Torque.

Since then he has appeared in films including The Heart Is Deceitful Above All Things, Seven Mummies, and Final Move. He has also appeared in an episode of CSI: Miami and Law & Order: Special Victims Unit. He appeared in two films in 2007: The Flock and Mr. Brooks. In 2008, Schulze wrote, directed, and starred in the web series The Acquirer. The film was shot on location in Paris, France, and was filmed entirely in high definition. Schulze stars opposite Tom Sizemore as Lucien, an international jewellery thief. He returned for the fifth installment of the Fast & Furious franchise, Fast Five, reprising his role as Vince.

== Filmography ==
=== Film ===
Year	Title	Role	Notes
1998	Blade	Crease	
1999	Dementia	Sonny	
2000	Boys and Girls	Paul	
2001	Downward Angel	John Hunter	
2001	The Fast and the Furious	Vince	
2002	The Transporter	Darren "Wall Street" Bettencourt	
2002	Blade II	Chupa	
2002	The Heart Is Deceitful Above All Things	Kenny	
2004	Out of Reach	Colonel Faisal	
2004	Torque	Henry James	
2005	Bounty Hunters	"Geronimo"	
2006	Seven Mummies	"Rock"	
2006	Final Move	Dan Marlowe	
2007	The Flock	Custis	
2007	Mr. Brooks	Meeks	
2009	Extract	Willie	
2011	Fast Five	Vince	
2018	Action Point	Killer	
2025	Transference	Sonny	

=== Television ===
Year	Title	Role	Notes
1998	Pacific Blue	Keith Ritter	Episode: "Damaged Goods"
1998	Charmed	Whitaker Berman	Episode: "Dream Sorcerer"
1998	7th Heaven	Sam	Episode: "Let's Talk About Sex"
2005	CSI: Miami	Eddie Davids	Episode: "Shootout"
2005	Law & Order: Special Victims Unit	Kevin Rogers	Episode: "Blood"
2007	Weeds	Biker	Episode: "Release the Hounds"
2008	The Acquirer	Lucien	Also director and writer
