= Riot on Redchurch Street =

Riot On Redchurch Street
- Directed by: Trevor Miller
- Produced by: Sean McLusky; Paul Woolf; Hamish McAlpine; Carole Siller
- Starring: Sam Hazeldine; Alysson Paradis; Jesse Birdsall; Les McKeown
- Cinematography: Stil Williams
- Music by: Siobhan Fahey Cristine soundtrack Stephane Bejean-Lebenson
- Release date: 2012
- Country: United Kingdom
- Language: English

Riot On Redchurch Street is a London-based musical drama directed by Trevor Miller and starring Sam Hazeldine, Alysson Paradis, Jesse Birdsall and Les McKeown. The soundtrack includes four original songs written by Siobhan Fahey.

== Plot ==
Set in the hipster-underworld of Shoreditch, East London, Riot depicts a bisexual love triangle that unravels between a British rock-and-roll manager (Hazeldine) and two of his clients — a French pop singer (Paradis) and the front man of a local punk band (played by newcomer Rhys James).

As racial tension bubbles on the streets of Shoreditch, stragglers outside a gig ignite a full-blown race riot on the steps of the Redchurch Street mosque, and before the night is over, the love triangle ends in blood and redemption.

== Cast ==
- Sam Hazeldine as Ray Mahoney
- Alysson Paradis as Astrid 'Angel' Renaud
- Jesse Birdsall as Dapper John MacKay
- Rhys James as Danny Reed
- Les McKeown as himself
- Lois Winstone as Carole Ecclestone
- Tam Dean Burn as Jerry Graff
- Johnny Borrell as Johnny The Doorman
- The Fabulous Russella as Terry Crystal
- Tim Noble and Sue Webster as Redchurch Street Scum
