= Trip City =

1989 novel by Trevor Miller

- First edition
- Author: Trevor Miller
- Language: English
- Publisher: Avernus Creative Media
- Publication date: 1989

Trip City is a novel set in the underground world of London nightclubs and concerns a fictional designer drug called FX. It was written by Trevor Miller and published in 1989 by Avernus Creative Media—a book imprint founded by science fiction author Brian Aldiss. The novel was packaged with a soundtrack cassette tape of original music by A Guy Called Gerald. Trip City was reissued by Colin Steven's Velocity Press imprint on August 15, 2021 along with the soundtrack on vinyl for the first time.
