= Trevor Miller =

British screenwriter, filmmaker and author (born 1965)

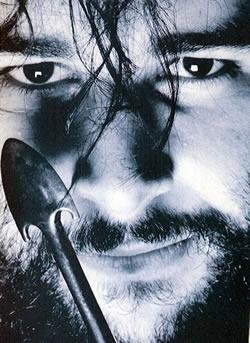
- Portrait by Stephanie Rushton.
- Born: 5 October 1965 (age 61); Manchester, England
- Occupations: Author, Screenwriter, Director

Trevor Miller is a British screenwriter, filmmaker and author who the Record Mirror joked "is hailed by some as the voice of a generation". The London Evening Standard called his debut novel Trip City "an On the Road for the post warehouse party generation." He has since moved to Los Angeles, where he writes film screenplays and has worked as a Director and Film/Video Editor. His re-imagined London musical Riot On Redchurch Street - The Director's Cut garnered the Best Director Award (Feature Film) at The Golden State Film Festival in 2025.

== Plays ==
- Heart of Saturday Night
- The Flesh Trader

== Bibliography ==
- Trip City (1989), ISBN 1-871503-02-7
- Trip City (2021) ISBN 9781913231095

== Filmography ==
- Bully (2001)
- Love Liza (2002)
- Spun (2002)
- Tiptoes (2002)
- This Girl's Life (2003)
- I Love Your Work (2003)
- The Heart Is Deceitful Above All Things (2004)
- Out of Reach (2004)
- Into the Sun (2005)
- The Killer Inside Me (2010)
- Riot On Redchurch Street (2012)
- Spring Breakers (2012)
- London Fields (2018)
- Riot On Redchurch Street - The Director's Cut (2025)
