= Fast Five =

2011 film by Justin Lin

- Theatrical release poster
- Directed by: Justin Lin
- Written by: Chris Morgan
- Based on: Characters by Gary Scott Thompson
- Produced by: Neal H. Moritz; Vin Diesel; Michael Fottrell
- Starring: Vin Diesel; Paul Walker; Jordana Brewster; Tyrese Gibson; Chris "Ludacris" Bridges; Matt Schulze; Sung Kang; Dwayne Johnson
- Cinematography: Stephen F. Windon
- Edited by: Christian Wagner; Kelly Matsumoto; Fred Raskin
- Music by: Brian Tyler
- Production companies: Universal Pictures; Original Film; One Race Films
- Distributed by: Universal Pictures
- Release dates: April 15, 2011 (Cinépolis Lagoon); April 29, 2011 (United States)
- Running time: 130 minutes
- Country: United States
- Language: English
- Budget: $125 million
- Box office: $630 million

Fast Five (also known as Fast & Furious 5) is a 2011 American action film directed by Justin Lin and written by Chris Morgan. It is the sequel to Fast & Furious (2009) and the fifth installment in the Fast & Furious franchise. The film stars Vin Diesel as Dominic Toretto and Paul Walker as Brian O'Conner, alongside Jordana Brewster, Tyrese Gibson, Gal Gadot, Ludacris, Matt Schulze, Sung Kang and Dwayne Johnson. In the film, Dom and Brian, along with Dom's sister Mia plan a heist to steal $100 million from corrupt businessman Hernan Reyes while being pursued for arrest by U.S. Diplomatic Security Service (DSS) agent Luke Hobbs.

While developing Fast Five, Universal Pictures deliberately departed from the street racing theme prevalent in previous films in the series, to transform the franchise into a heist action series involving cars. By doing so, they hoped to attract wider audiences that might otherwise be put off by a heavy emphasis on cars and car culture. Fast Five is considered the transitional film in the series, featuring only one car race and giving more attention to action set pieces such as brawls, gunfights, and the central heist. The production mounted a comprehensive marketing campaign, with the film being advertised through social media, virtual games, cinema chains, automobile manufacturers, and at NASCAR races.

Lin, Diesel, and Walker's returns were finalized in February 2010. Principal photography began that July and lasted until that October, with filming locations including Atlanta, Puerto Rico, and Rio de Janeiro. Brian Tyler, the composer of the previous two installments, returned to compose the score. The film is notable for primarily featuring practical stunt work as opposed to computer-generated imagery.

Fast Five premiered at the Cinépolis Lagoon in Rio de Janeiro on April 15, 2011, and was released in the United States on April 29 by Universal. The film received positive reviews, with praise for Lin's direction, the action sequences, and the cast's performances; it is widely considered the best film in the franchise. Fast Five grossed $630 million worldwide, becoming the seventh-highest-grossing film of 2011, the then-highest-grossing film in the franchise, and set several records related to Universal's highest-grossing opening weekend in several international markets. It was followed by Fast & Furious 6 in 2013.

== Plot ==
After capturing Braga, Dominic Toretto is sentenced to twenty-five years in jail, while being transported by bus to Lompoc Prison, (Note: As depicted in Fast & Furious (2009)) his sister Mia Toretto and friend Brian O'Conner lead an assault on the bus, freeing Dom. While the authorities search for them, the trio escape to Rio de Janeiro. Awaiting Dom's arrival, Brian and Mia join their friend Vince and other participants on a job to steal three cars from a train. Brian and Mia learn that agents from the DEA are on the train and that the cars are seized property. When Dom arrives with his accomplices, he realizes that their leader Zizi is only interested in stealing the Ford GT40. Dom has Mia steal the car herself before he and Brian fight Zizi and his henchmen, during which Zizi kills the DEA agents. Dom and Brian are captured and brought to drug lord Hernan Reyes, the owner of the cars and Zizi's boss. Reyes orders the pair interrogated to discover the car's location, but they escape to their safehouse.

Dom, Brian and Mia are framed as the murderers of the DEA agents, and the U.S. government sends a team of Diplomatic Security Service agents, led by DSS Agent Luke Hobbs and assisted by state police officer Elena Neves, to Rio to arrest them. While Dom, Brian and Mia examine the car to discover its importance, Vince arrives and is caught removing a computer chip from it. He admits he was planning to sell the chip to Reyes, and Dom angrily forces him to leave. Brian discovers the chip contains financial details of Reyes's criminal empire, including the locations of US$100 million in cash. Hobbs and his team arrive at Dom's safehouse, but find it under assault by Reyes' men searching for the chip. Dom, Brian and Mia escape after a chase across the favelas. Dom suggests they split up and leave Rio, but Mia announces she is pregnant with Brian's child. Dom agrees to stick together, suggesting they steal Reyes' money to start a new life. They recruit Han Lue, Gisele Yashar, Tego Leo, and Rico Santos, Dom's former allies, as well as Roman Pearce and Tej Parker, Brian's partners from his mission in Miami. (Note: As depicted in 2 Fast 2 Furious (2003))

To centralize the cash, Dom's team attacks one of the locations and burns the money in front of Reyes's staff. Afraid of further attacks, Reyes consolidates the remaining money in an evidence vault inside a police station. Dom's team does surveillance, buys equipment, and acquires Reyes's handprint. After their fastest cars prove to be too slow for security cameras, they steal four 2010 Dodge Charger police cars to blend in. Vince rejoins Dom's team after saving Mia from Reyes's men. Hobbs's team eventually finds and arrests Dom, Mia, Brian, and Vince. While transporting them for extradition to the United States in a Gurkha LAPV, the convoy is attacked by Reyes's men. Dom, Brian, Mia, and Vince help Hobbs and Elena escape the ambush, but the rest of Hobbs's men and Vince are killed. Enraged at their team's deaths, Hobbs and Elena agree to help with the heist. The gang breaks into the police station with the LAPV and uses two of the Chargers to tear the vault holding Reyes's money from the building, dragging it through the city.

Advancing on the bridge after an extensive police chase, Dom has Brian continue without him while he smashes the police and Reyes's vehicles with the vault. Brian returns and kills Zizi. Hobbs arrives and executes the injured Reyes in retribution for his team. Hobbs gives Dom and Brian a 24-hour head start to escape on the condition they leave the vault as it is. When Dom and Brian depart, however, Hobbs finds the vault empty, as Dom's crew switched it via a trash truck before they reached the bridge. After splitting the cash and giving Vince's family his cut, Dom's team go their separate ways. In Monaco, Leo and Santos are gambling away their share at a casino. Han and Gisele are on vacation traveling down the German Autobahn, Tej and Roman have each purchased their very own Koenigsegg CCXR Edition, and on a tropical beach, Brian challenges Dom to a final, no-stakes race to prove who is the better driver. During the end credits, Dom and Brian are seen racing each other in their new cars to the limit.

In a mid-credits scene in Washington, D.C., Hobbs is given a file by Monica Fuentes concerning the hijack of a military convoy in Berlin, where he discovers a recent photo of Dom's girlfriend, Letty, who had been presumed dead.

== Cast ==
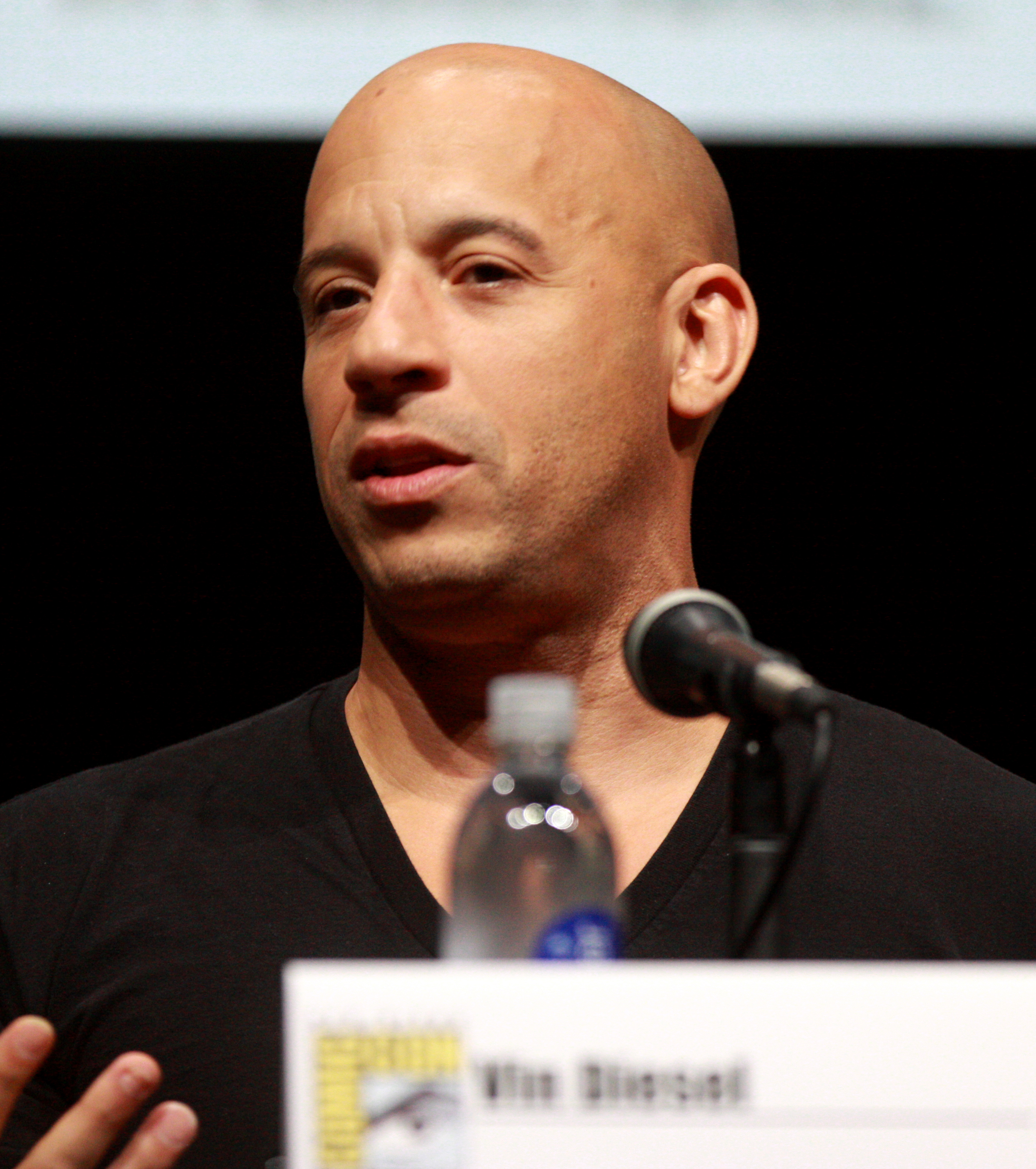
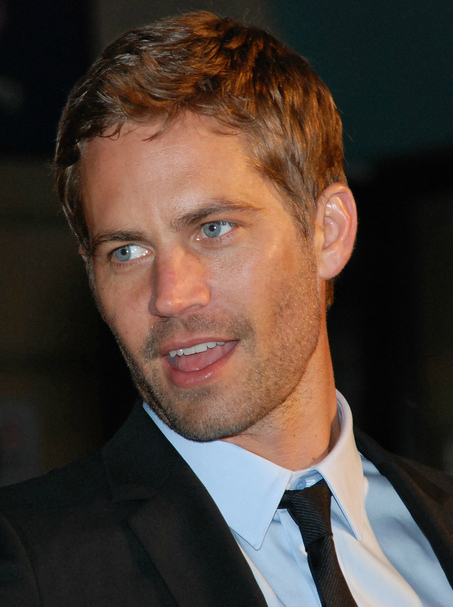
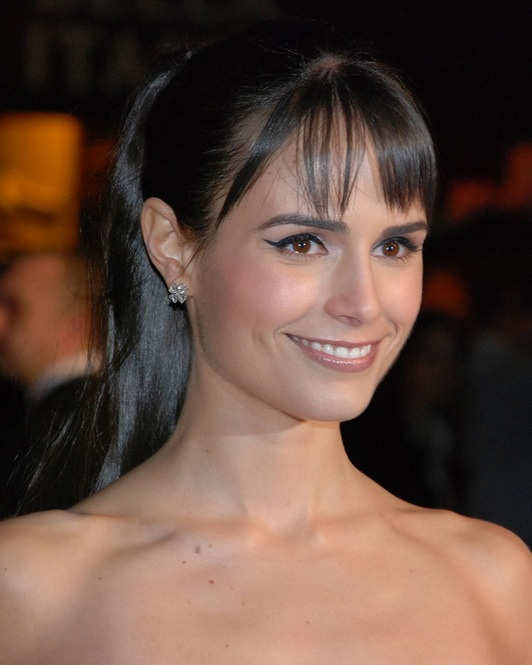
Top to bottom: Vin Diesel, Paul Walker, and Jordana Brewster reprised their roles from the original The Fast and the Furious (2001) and Fast & Furious (2009).
- Vin Diesel as Dominic Toretto:
  A professional criminal, street racer, and fugitive. Known as the leader of the crew. Diesel was reportedly paid $15 million to star in and produce the film.
- Paul Walker as Brian O'Conner:
  A former LAPD police officer and FBI agent turned criminal. He is in a relationship with Mia Toretto. Walker did many of his own stunts for the film, training with parkour professional Paul Darnell to improve his movement.
- Jordana Brewster as Mia Toretto:
  Dominic's sister and Brian's girlfriend; she is revealed to be pregnant.
- Tyrese Gibson as Roman Pearce:
  Brian's childhood friend. Known for being the slick talker of the team as well as an expert driver. Gibson's involvement was reported on June 30, 2010, reprising his role from 2 Fast 2 Furious (2003). Gibson was committed to Transformers: Dark of the Moon at the time he signed on to Fast Five, so he flew between Puerto Rico and Atlanta to accommodate both films.
- Ludacris (credited as Chris “Ludacris” Bridges) as Tej Parker:
  Brian's and Roman's friend from Miami in 2 Fast 2 Furious. Brought on the team as the tech expert. Ludacris announced his involvement in the film on July 12, 2010, when he stated he had arrived in Puerto Rico to begin filming.
- Matt Schulze as Vince:
  Dominic's childhood friend. Schulze had appeared in the original film, The Fast and the Furious (2001), and it was reported on July 16, 2010, that he would be returning. He has a grudge against Brian for the events that happened in the first film, but they become friends after he saves Mia from Reyes' men.
- Sung Kang as Han Lue:
  A street racer who was Dominic's business partner in the Dominican Republic during the events of Los Bandoleros and Fast & Furious (both 2009).
- Gal Gadot as Gisele Yashar:
  A former Mossad agent, returning from Fast & Furious. Although Gadot had prior experience handling motorcycles, she was required to learn how to ride the larger, more powerful Ducati Streetfighter for the film.
- Joaquim de Almeida as Hernan Reyes:
  A ruthless drug lord posing as a legitimate businessman. It was reported on July 16, 2010, that Almeida would play Reyes. Having previously played several antagonists, he hesitated to take this role, but accepted it after speaking with Lin and hearing his take on the character.
- Dwayne Johnson as Luke Hobbs:
  A DSS agent. According to producer Vin Diesel, the role of Hobbs was originally developed with Tommy Lee Jones in mind. However, when reading feedback on his Facebook page, Diesel noted a fan stating a desire to see Diesel and Johnson in a film together. Diesel and Lin then redesigned the role for Johnson. Johnson wanted to work with Universal Studios, citing their support for him during his transition from wrestling to acting. He described the role as a former bounty hunter turned US Marshal and as "the government's version of the best bounty hunter on the planet". He undertook an extensive daily workout regime to enlarge his physique, wanting his character to appear as a "hunter" and to be formidable enough to present a credible threat to the protagonists.
- Elsa Pataky as Elena Neves:
  A Rio police officer who works with Hobbs' team and becomes Dominic's love interest. It was reported on July 16, 2010, that Pataky would take this role. She underwent several days of tactical training with a police/military technical advisor and was required to learn how to handle her gun in a variety of situations to portray Elena believably.

The central cast is rounded out by Puerto Rican singers Tego Calderón and Don Omar as Leo and Santos respectively, members of the heist team, reprising their roles from Los Bandoleros and Fast & Furious. Michael Irby plays Reyes' right-hand man Zizi. Alimi Ballard, Fernando Chien, Yorgo Constantine, and Geoff Meedy portray Hobbs' team members Fusco, Wilkes, Chato, and Macroy. Luis Da Silva portrays Diogo, an elite Brazilian racer who challenges Dom and Brian to a winner-takes-all race. Michelle Rodriguez appears in photographs as Letty Ortiz, Dominic's girlfriend who is presumed dead following the events of Fast & Furious. Eva Mendes appears in an uncredited cameo as Agent Monica Fuentes, reprising her role from 2 Fast 2 Furious.

== Production ==
=== Development ===
By February 3, 2010, it was confirmed that a fifth film, referred to as Fast Five, was going into production in the Fast & Furious series, and that a sixth film was being planned. It was also confirmed that Diesel, Walker, writer Chris Morgan and producer Neal H. Moritz would all return to their roles for the new installment. Moritz said that, following the success of Fast & Furious (2009), which had reunited Diesel, Walker, Rodriguez and Brewster from The Fast and the Furious (2001), the production wanted to bring them back again for this film, but however, Rodriguez ultimately didn't appear in this film and only made a cameo appearance during the mid-credits scene. Diesel felt that the story between the characters portrayed by himself and Walker should continue, envisioning it as three chapters, of which this film would be the last. Diesel also wanted to bring back a variety of characters that had been in previous films without interacting, put them together and "have a lot of fun".

The production had originally intended to film on location in Rio de Janeiro. However, the Puerto Rican government offered tax incentives totaling nearly $11 million, influencing the decision to film there, using Puerto Rico to represent Rio de Janeiro.

Universal intended to transform the series from street-racing action into a series of heist films with car chases in the vein of The Italian Job (1969) and The French Connection (1971), with Fast Five as the transitional movie. In April 2011, Universal chairman Adam Fogelson said:

The question putting Fast Five and Fast Six together for us was: Can we take it out of being a pure car culture movie and into being a true action franchise in the spirit of those great heist films made 10 or 15 years ago?

Fogelson said that the racing aspect had put a "ceiling" on the number of people willing to see films in the series, and that, by turning it into a series where car driving ability is just one aspect of the film, he hoped to increase the series' audience.

=== Writing ===
"For me, each chapter in this franchise is an extension of the first one, and they each get bigger. It is always a privilege to be able to revisit a good character-driven story. This franchise is more than street racing and tuner cars; it really is about this larger family and community of racers."

— Morgan on his approach to writing the film

Lin wanted to explore the elements of "freedom and family" in the film and collaborated with Morgan towards that ideal, both having worked together on The Fast and the Furious: Tokyo Drift (2006) and Fast & Furious (2009). Morgan worked with Diesel to produce a story arc that would further explore and develop Diesel's character. An idea involving heisting a large safe had been conceived by Morgan during the production of Fast & Furious (2009), but that film's premise did not work with how Morgan envisioned it. He later incorporated it into this film.

=== Filming ===
On a budget of $125 million, the shooting of Fast Five was scheduled for July and August 2010. Shooting had started by July 14, 2010.

Three film units worked simultaneously. The main cast were required to travel to Rio at the behest of Lin, who felt it important to understand the area and its culture to give the film a good sense of place. Diesel agreed that it was important to shoot key scenes in Brazil, commenting "we were able to shoot where other productions might not be able to shoot because our franchise has such good street cred."

The Rio film unit captured aerial shots of the city including Sugarloaf Mountain, Fort Copacabana, Ipanema Beach, the Dona Marta lookout point and the Christ the Redeemer statue. Establishing shots of the heist team members were taken as each arrived in Rio. Gibson was filmed arriving in character at Galeão International Airport but, when it became publicly known that a scene was being shot at the airport, the cast and crew were mobbed. A similar situation occurred while Ludacris was shooting a scene in which his character buys a car to drive around the city. A scene where the completed heist team walk down a beach was filmed in Copacabana.

The rooftop pursuit across favelas was filmed in Puerto Rico, where the production could have more control over the area. The main and second filming units began filming in and around the capital, San Juan. The island's mixture of tropical greenery and wide streets allowed the production to re-create the densely populated favelas of Rio while completing the larger action and external scenes without incident. Production designer Peter Wenham had the task of transforming Puerto Rico and Atlanta into the previously scouted Rio locations in four weeks, as the production deemed Rio unsuitable for filming many of the larger scenes. Wenham had to reinforce buildings to support the heavy camera equipment, and to alter the colors of more than 30 buildings in the city to make them suitable for filming. His team needed to alter the buildings and strew debris to make the area look disheveled and appear as a Rio favela. Wenham remarked that, though the development was difficult, in part due to the heat, it was "a walk in the park" compared with filming in the Rio favelas themselves. Wenham aimed to maintain a monochromatic color scheme for the film, with muted blacks and grays, including his choice of colors for the cars used. He only chose to add a multitude of colors in the favela set. The Teodoro Moscoso Bridge connecting San Juan to neighboring Isla Verde was used to film the final showdown between Dom and Reyes, while a U.S. Navy base pier 60 miles outside San Juan stood in for the bridge for scenes involving the vault smashing cars. Action scenes were also filmed in the Milla de Oro financial district of Hato Rey, Río Piedras and Santurce districts of San Juan.

A foot pursuit in which Diesel, Brewster and Walker are pursued across favela rooftops by Johnson and his team was filmed over the course of a week in the small hillside town of Naranjito, Puerto Rico. The scene was considered difficult to shoot, as pathways were slippery from moist tropical heat and the scene involved actors and stunt doubles running while avoiding dogs, chickens and other stray animals loose in the area. To capture the scene, a 420-foot cable-camera rig was used to allow for a fast moving, birds-eye view of the action, and cameras on cranes were set up on rooftops and in alleyways. Walker and Brewster made multiple takes of the conclusion of the scene, requiring them to jump nearly 30 feet from a building onto a waiting safety mat. In total the production employed 236 technicians, 13,145 extras, and generated 16,824 room nights at hotels, contributing $27 million to the Puerto Rican community.

Filming moved to Atlanta, Georgia, for the final phase. Wenham and his team transformed a defunct train yard into an abandoned auto plant used by the protagonists as their headquarters. Redesigning the train yard took place over several months. It was required to allow enough space for stunt drivers to drive into the building, and it had to include an integrated lighting system. The design team removed walls, hauled out old railway cars, suspended rusted car parts and auto-plant car rails, and constructed smaller buildings within the main building to transform the site. With twenty-five pages of script to shoot in a limited time, cinematographer Stephen Windon and his team spent three weeks setting up a series of high-powered, motorized lights in the rafters of the building, that could be controlled remotely to allow lighting to be altered quickly while fully illuminating the set. An exterior scene involving Diesel and Walker attending a car party, involving several high-performance cars, was filmed near the Georgia Dome. The train heist scene was filmed in Rice, California over three weeks.

A brawl scene between Johnson's and Diesel's characters was considered difficult to choreograph. The characters were written to be equally formidable, so the fight was punctuated with moments of character development, as Moritz felt this made the fight more exciting. The scene required several weeks of rehearsal and more than a week of filming by the actors and their stunt doubles, who incurred several minor injuries.

=== Visual effects and animation ===
The Moving Picture Company (MPC) provided the visual effects for the film in Vancouver, British Columbia. Guillaume Rocheron was the visual effects supervisor, and Dawn Brooks MacLeod was the visual effects producer. The studio completed around 240 shots for the film's high-speed train heist sequence, which included "a CGI train, bridge and canyon, digital fire and destruction shots and Paul Walker and Vin Diesel digi doubles." The bridge and canyon were animated with computer animation, with the canyon also being created as 2.5D matte paintings, with the team using guide photo references of the Marble Canyon in Arizona. The effects department also created high resolution volumetric dust that "would cut back to back with practical shots as well as complex digital fire and destruction effects for when the truck crashes into the bridge and tumbles behind the car, forcing our heroes to jump into the canyon." MPC's Nuke 3D pipeline was put at full use to create animated background stitches that were used to "add in the desert environment on the green-screen shots." Pixomondo also provided the visual effects for the film in Los Angeles, California; Rainer Gombos was the visual effects supervisor, and Sophie Leclerc was the visual effects producer.

=== Vehicle stunts ===
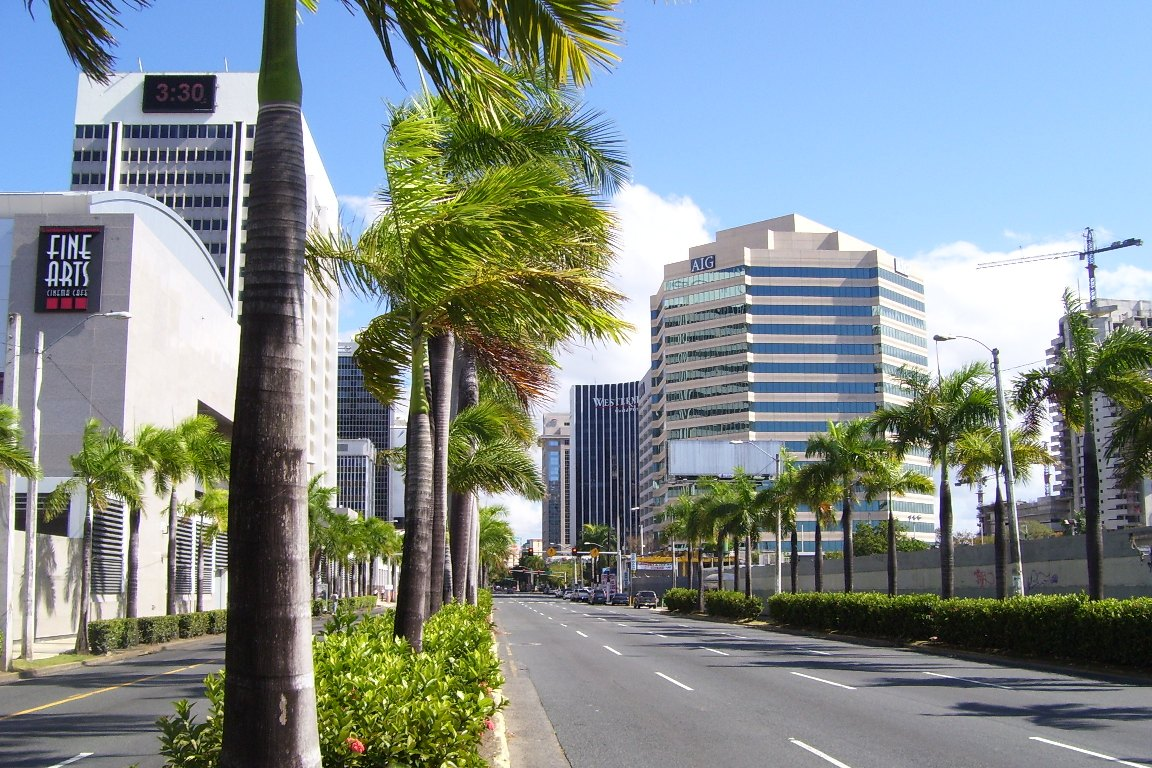
Most of the climactic scenes were filmed in the Milla de Oro district in Hato Rey, Puerto Rico.

The climactic vault heist required four weeks of preparation with every scene and camera angle determined in advance. The filmmakers hired stuntmen Spiro Razatos and Jack Gill to direct the second-unit action filming and serve as stunt coordinator respectively. The pair initially began research for the stunt by testing the capabilities of the prop vaults and the Dodge Chargers driven by Diesel and Walker. Filmed on the streets of Hato Rey, the chaotic scene demanded specific timing that had to be synchronized with the various character interactions also occurring during the scene. Razatos chose to use a series of camera cars including a crane-mounted camera atop a Porsche Cayenne, which allowed him to film from a variety of angles and heights while the vehicles were in motion, and a Subaru Impreza with a steel cage built around it that allowed for tracking shots. The Subaru's driver Allen Padelford would occasionally accidentally collide with the vault, creating a shower of sparks that inadvertently became useful footage. Padelford also developed a top-mount dual-drive system for the Chargers that allowed a stunt driver to control the vehicle from the roof, while the actor focused on their performance inside the car.

Six versions of the 8-foot high vault were built, each with specific uses. One of the vaults was a façade built onto the front of a semi-truck and was used for filming close shots of the vault destroying streetcars. Another vault was a reinforced, four-wheel self-drive vehicle that was connected to 30-foot (9.1 m) cables and dragged through the streets of San Juan by the two stunt Dodge Chargers. The four-short-ton (3.6 t) vault was driven by stunt driver Henry Kingi, who had to wear a temperature-controlled suit to compensate for the temperatures within that could exceed 100 °F (38 °C). A scene where the vault tumbled as the cars rounded a corner was a practical effect, and the result was more violent than the filmmakers had anticipated. Over 200 vehicles were destroyed by the vault during filming. Several stunts had to be cut including a final scene that would have seen the vault hanging over the edge of the Teodoro Moscoso Bridge. This stunt was abandoned when it was determined that even the powerful Chargers would not be able to support the vault's weight.

The train heist presented several challenges. The filmmakers were required to effectively purchase a length of working railroad for filming and the trains necessary to ride the tracks. Then trucks had to be built that could race the train and meet the needs of the heist itself. Lin also required that the cars being carried on the train be able to jump out of the train at full speed. The scene took precise execution. The filmmakers chose to use cars they could cheaply replicate for the train heist—a 1972 De Tomaso Pantera, a 2007 Chevrolet Corvette GS Roadster, and a Ford GT40—to avoid the expense of replacing a genuine $2 million Ford GT40.

=== Music ===
The film soundtrack was released on iTunes on April 25, 2011, and on CD on May 3, 2011, by ABKCO Records. It features many reggaeton and rhythmic Latin tracks, including songs by Don Omar, Busta Rhymes and many others, with three pieces from Tyler's original score for the film: "Assembling the Team", "Mad Skills" and "Fast Five Suite". Music guide AllMusic awarded the album 3 stars out of 5, commenting that "The goal here is to accompany a picture that, as usual, is packed with driving sequences involving flashy cars, beautiful, scantily clad women, and muscled men. That goal is accomplished with this beat-heavy music and the gruff, aggressive Latin rapping." Ludacris collaborated with Slaughterhouse and Claret Jai for the soundtrack's lead single, "Furiously Dangerous".

The film score was released on May 3, 2011, by Varèse Sarabande. The release has 25 tracks and plays for 78 minutes. The score spent four weeks on the Billboard 200, peaking as high as number 60 and reaching number 24 on the digital albums chart and number 5 on the soundtrack-only chart.

== Marketing ==
An example of Fast Five's cross-media marketing. A Regal Entertainment Group-branded, virtual drive-in theater in Car Town, shows the trailer for Fast Five.

The Facebook game Car Town by Cie Games and the theater chain Regal Entertainment Group (REG) collaborated with Universal in a cross-media marketing promotion. Car Town allowed players to view the trailer for the film in an REG-branded, in-game drive-in theater and race around a virtual Rio de Janeiro. The game also featured missions and locations based on the plot of the film, while allowing players to race against Fast Five characters and take part in a bank heist. REG offered players of Car Town the ability to purchase tickets in-game via Fandango for films at REG theaters. By buying these tickets in-game, players were given promotional codes which in turn allowed them to unlock a virtual 1970s Dodge Charger, used by Diesel's character in the original film. REG promoted the partnership between the film and the game in their theaters across 37 states, online and through social media, while Universal promoted it via their own Facebook, Twitter and YouTube sites. In October 2011, it was claimed that over 200 million races had taken place within the virtual Rio de Janeiro environment in the six months since the campaign's April launch.

Automobile manufacturer Dodge collaborated with Universal in marketing the film, supplying several Dodge Chargers to use in it. The partnership with Dodge included the "Fast Five" Dodge Charger driven by Robby Gordon in the NASCAR Sprint Cup Series throughout April 2011 – the opening month of Fast Five. Dodge also sponsored the world premiere of the film in Rio de Janeiro.

== Release ==
=== Theatrical ===
Fast Five was originally planned to be released on June 10, 2011, before being pushed forward to April 29. The film held its world premiere at the Cinépolis Lagoon theater in Rio de Janeiro, Brazil, on April 15.

=== Home media ===
On August 2, 2011, USA Network purchased the rights to the United States network premiere of Fast Five. The film was released on DVD and Blu-ray in the United Kingdom on September 5, 2011, and in the United States on October 4, 2011, in 2.35:1 aspect ratio with DTS HD Master Audio 5.1 sound. A triple pack was also released containing a Blu-ray, DVD, and digital copy of the film in either Blu-ray or DVD packaging. The Blu-ray versions contains several exclusive additional features, including behind-the-scenes footage, cast and crew interviews, a "virtual car garage" that provides further details on the vehicles used in the production, and music tracks from the film. Both the DVD and the Blu-ray contain a theatrical cut of 130 minutes and extended cut of 132 minutes of the film, director commentary, deleted scenes, a gag reel and features on the three central characters. Commenting on the extended cut, Lin said "this is the version that I prefer." During first week sales in the United States the DVD was the number 1 selling DVD, the number 1 rental DVD, and the number 2 selling Blu-ray disc behind the Blu-ray re-release of The Lion King. 57% of the total first week disc sales of Fast Five were the Blu-ray disc version.

To promote the release of the DVD and Blu-ray, Universal Studios Home Entertainment sponsored the first race of the NASCAR Camping World Truck Series, at the Chicagoland Speedway. The event, renamed as the "Fast Five 225", took place on September 16, 2011, with Gibson and Brewster as Grand Marshals; Gibson sang the American national anthem for the event and Brewster acted as honorary starter. The event served as the kickoff for the first weekend of the Chase for the Sprint Cup and was won by Austin Dillon. The deal marked the first time that a film promotion had been allowed to take over a NASCAR race as a title sponsor. Continuing the partnership with Car Town, the game was used as the exclusive means of pre-ordering the Blu-ray/DVD combo release at Walmart, via players clicking on a Walmart-themed truck, which in turn provided the player with Fast Five branded in-game rewards.

Fast Five was released on 4K UHD Blu-ray on June 11, 2019.

== Reception ==
=== Box office ===
Fast Five grossed $209.8 million (33.5%) in the United States and Canada and $416.3 million (66.5%) in other territories for a total of $626.1 million. Worldwide, it is the seventh-highest-grossing film of 2011. It achieved a worldwide opening weekend of $109.6 million. The film reached a peak of number 55 on the list of all-time highest-grossing films worldwide in October 2011. It became the highest-grossing film in the Fast & Furious franchise in worldwide grosses (as well as separately in the US and Canada, and outside the US and Canada) but was out-grossed in all three cases by Fast & Furious 6.

==== United States and Canada ====
According to Box Office Mojo, Fast Five is one of the most successful sequels of 2011, when taking into account that it is one of few to have outperformed the immediately-preceding installment of its franchise in the US and Canada.

Fast Five opened in the United States on April 29, 2011, in 3,644 theaters, It took $3.8 million in midnight showings, setting new records for the Fast & Furious series and Universal (both records overtaken by Fast & Furious 6). By the end of its opening day, it had accrued a total of $34.4 million (including midnight earnings), setting an April opening-day record, replacing Fast & Furious ($30.5 million), and marking the third largest Friday outside of the summer and holiday period, behind The Hunger Games and Alice in Wonderland. In total, Fast Five earned $86.2 million during its opening weekend, an average of $23,655 per theater, with IMAX showings contributing over $8 million. It thus set an opening-weekend record for the Fast & Furious series, for Universal (both records overtaken by Fast & Furious 6), and for films released in April (the record was surpassed in 2014 by Captain America: The Winter Soldier). It also achieved the third-largest spring opening, behind The Hunger Games and Alice in Wonderland. The film also set an opening-weekend record among films starring Diesel, Walker, Brewster, Johnson, Moritz and Lin, records overtaken in all cases by Fast & Furious 6.

The film opened dropped 62% on its second weekend, earning $32.4 million, and ranking second behind Thor. This result was partially attributed to the reduction in IMAX and large-format screens showing the film (reduced from 244 to 20), since IMAX contributed only $510,000 to the film's second-weekend gross. On June 4, 2011, 37 days after release in the US, the film became the first of 2011 to accrue more than $200 million. The film received a one-week re-release in IMAX theaters on September 30, 2011.

The film drew revenues of US$209,837,675 in the US and Canada, $416,300,000 elsewhere, for a worldwide total of $626,137,675. The box office ranking peaked at number 1 for all films of 2011 (as of 2021, ranked at number 6), number 103 for all-time US films (as of 2021, ranked number 197), and for all-time worldwide films number 55 (as of 2021, at number 151).

==== Other territories ====
Fast Five was initially released in Australia on Wednesday, April 20, 2011 – nine days before the release date in North America – followed by releases in the UK, South Korea and New Zealand. The earlier start in these countries was timed to coincide with their Easter holidays and avoided competition from forthcoming summer films, although this placed it in direct competition with Thor in some countries. By the end of its opening weekend, the film had accrued a total of $23.4 million from these countries. On its second weekend, Fast Five earned $46.3 million across 3,139 theaters in 14 countries, ranking first at the box office in each of its ten new markets. For the overall weekend, it ranked second behind Thor. In the third weekend of release, Fast Five topped the box office in a further 44 countries, playing in a total of 6,979 theaters across 58 countries. It ranked first during the weekend with $85.8 million. It set an opening-weekend record in the United Arab Emirates ($1.65 million), holding this record for two weeks before being out-grossed by Pirates of the Caribbean: On Stranger Tides ($2.24 million).

Across all markets, the film scored Universal's highest-grossing opening weekend in Russia, Spain, Turkey, Argentina, Brazil, Chile, France, India, Italy, Malaysia, Mexico, the Netherlands, Thailand, the United Arab Emirates and Vietnam.

=== Critical response ===
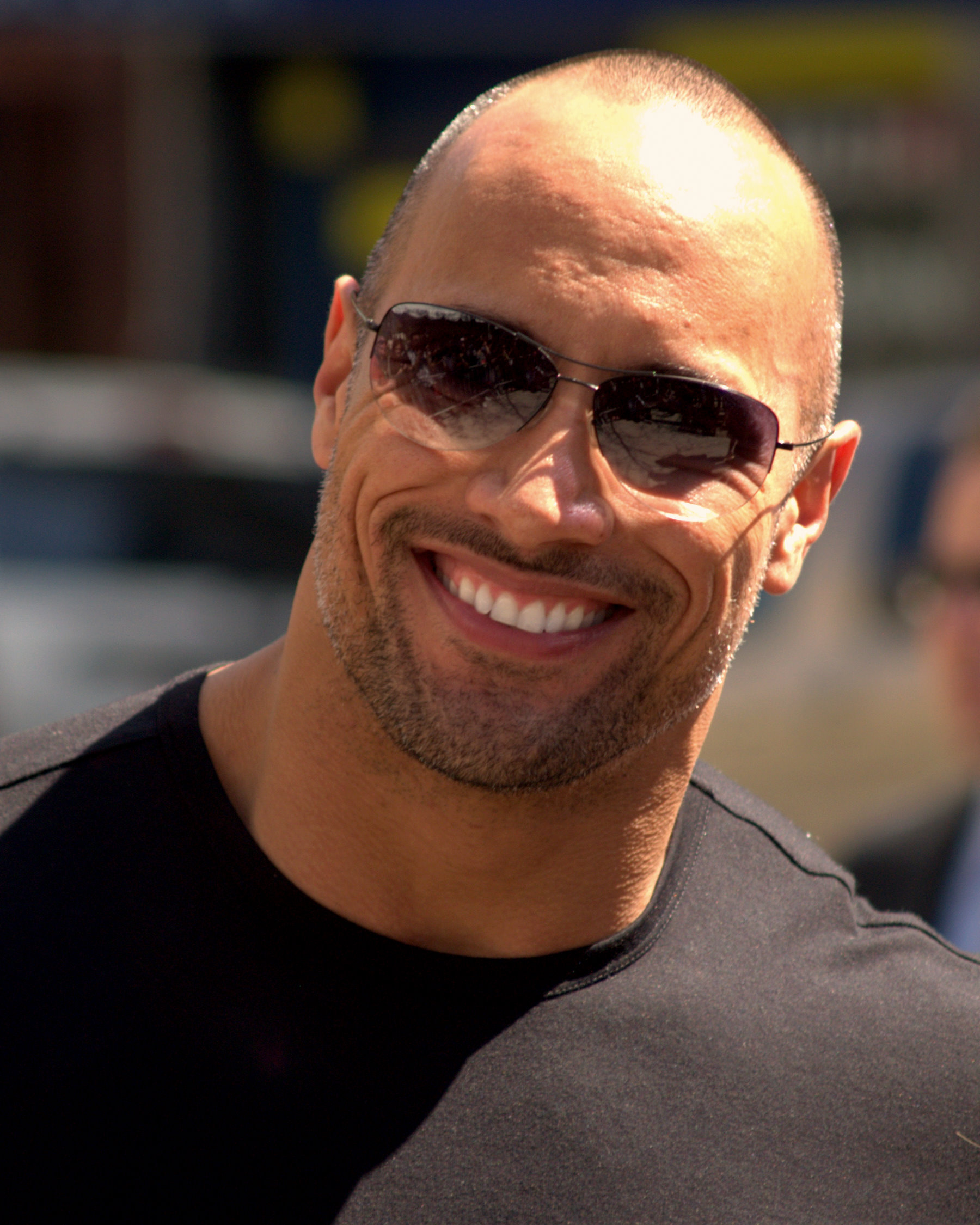
Dwayne Johnson received praise from several critics for his performance.

On Rotten Tomatoes, Fast Five has an approval rating of 77% with an average rating of 207 based on 207 reviews. The website's critical consensus reads, "Sleek, loud, and over the top, Fast Five proudly embraces its brainless action thrills and injects new life into the franchise." On Metacritic, the film has a score of 66 out of 100, based on reviews from 41 critics, indicating "generally favorable reviews". Audiences polled by CinemaScore gave the film an average grade of "A" on an A+ to F scale.

Roger Ebert gave the film 3 out of 4 stars, praising it as "a skillfully assembled 130 minutes at the movies, with actors capable of doing absurd things with straight faces, and action sequences that toy idly with the laws of physics", while Richard Corliss of Time considered it "maybe the first great film of the post-human era". The New York Times said it deftly combined action and humor, stating "The only time you won't be watching the screen is when your eyes have squeezed shut because you're laughing so hard." The Telegraph appreciated the presence of Johnson and Diesel together, calling it a "cosmic event", and added that director Lin had revitalized the series, saying "the start and finish here, defying every imaginable law of physics, are series highs." Empire also heaped praise on Johnson, saying "How to re-ignite an ageing franchise? Drop [Johnson] on it. The best thing, by far, in Fast Five ... Dwayne Johnson hulks through the movie leaving testosterone trails in his wake." However, Empire took the view that the film itself was "not, by any normal criteria, a good film", arguing that it was too long, although conceding that the action scenes, in particular the final car chase, made the film "the most entertaining in the series." Anna Smith of Time Out London also commented that the film was too long and criticized the simplistic characters and dialog, but she called the film "slick" and stated that these criticisms could be overlooked because "it doesn't take itself too seriously." Variety focused on the roles of Johnson and Diesel, lamenting the current lack of 1980s-style "brawny" leading men and of the "manly men" typical of the 1950s and 1960s, and calling their pairing "a welcome injection of tough-guy vigor". Variety commented that, based on Fast Five, a "sixth entry could be something worth waiting for". The New Yorker called the action scenes "spectacular", praising director Lin by saying his "direction and the sharp editing never confuse or lose momentum", but also found the film too long and criticized the dialog, labeling it "subpar Ocean's Eleven-style banter". On the characters, The New Yorker considered Walker and Diesel "serviceable", but singled out Johnson for praise for bringing a "hip, comic knowingness to his role ... his enjoyment is infectious and keeps the movie speeding along."

Total Film welcomed the return of Ludacris and Tyrese Gibson to "[inject] the film with much-needed laughs" and felt that Johnson fit into the established cast with ease, though it believed the film itself was "no mould-breaker." Peter Travers of Rolling Stone, who disliked the previous movies, gave the film 2.5 stars out of 4, praising the transformation of the series into a heist film ("Damn it, it works"), commenting favorably on scenes between Johnson and Diesel, and judging that "Fast Five will push all your action buttons, and some you haven't thought of." The Los Angeles Times felt that scenes shared by Diesel and Johnson were the "best moments" and appreciated the humor, but considered the pacing a "strange mix", switching between exposition, comedy scenes and then sudden action. The reviewer echoed other critics' sentiments concerning the running time of the film, but concluded that "the sheer audacity of "Fast Five" is kind of breathtaking in a metal-twisting, death-defying, mission-implausible, B-movie-on-steroids kind of way", labeling it the "best" of the series.

Both Empire and Variety noted that the final chase scene of Fast Five contained allusions to Bad Boys II (2003): Variety stated that the scene "seems inspired in part by a similarly spectacular scene in Bad Boys II"; Empire said that it "nearly out-Bad-Boys-2s Bad Boys 2".

Not all reviews were positive. Film4 criticized both the film's long running time and its treatment of female characters, remarking "Some cameo strikingly in buttock form. Others actually have first names". But Film4 praised Johnson's role as DSS agent Luke Hobbs, saying he "provides a more credible anti-antagonist to our anti-heroes than the straight up villains can manage". The Boston Herald gave a more mixed reaction: it derided the lack of realism as removing any sense of threat to the protagonists, but conceded that "these films may be robustly anti-intellectual and deplorably commercialized, but they are the envy of the rest of the world." Despite giving the film a positive review and praising the action, The Hollywood Reporter was critical of its stars, saying "it's clear the budget wasn't used on acting lessons for the cast." Time Out New York stated that "The Fast and the Furious movies haven't exactly gotten better as they've gone along" but gave the director a backhanded compliment, saying "Justin Lin, taking his third turn behind the franchise's wheel, is at least a competent hack." Ebert was more complimentary, saying "Justin Lin is emerging as a first-rate director in this second-rate genre" and Rolling Stone managed "Justin Lin, who misdirected the last two sequels, finds his pace this time, staging dynamite action."

=== Brazilian critics ===
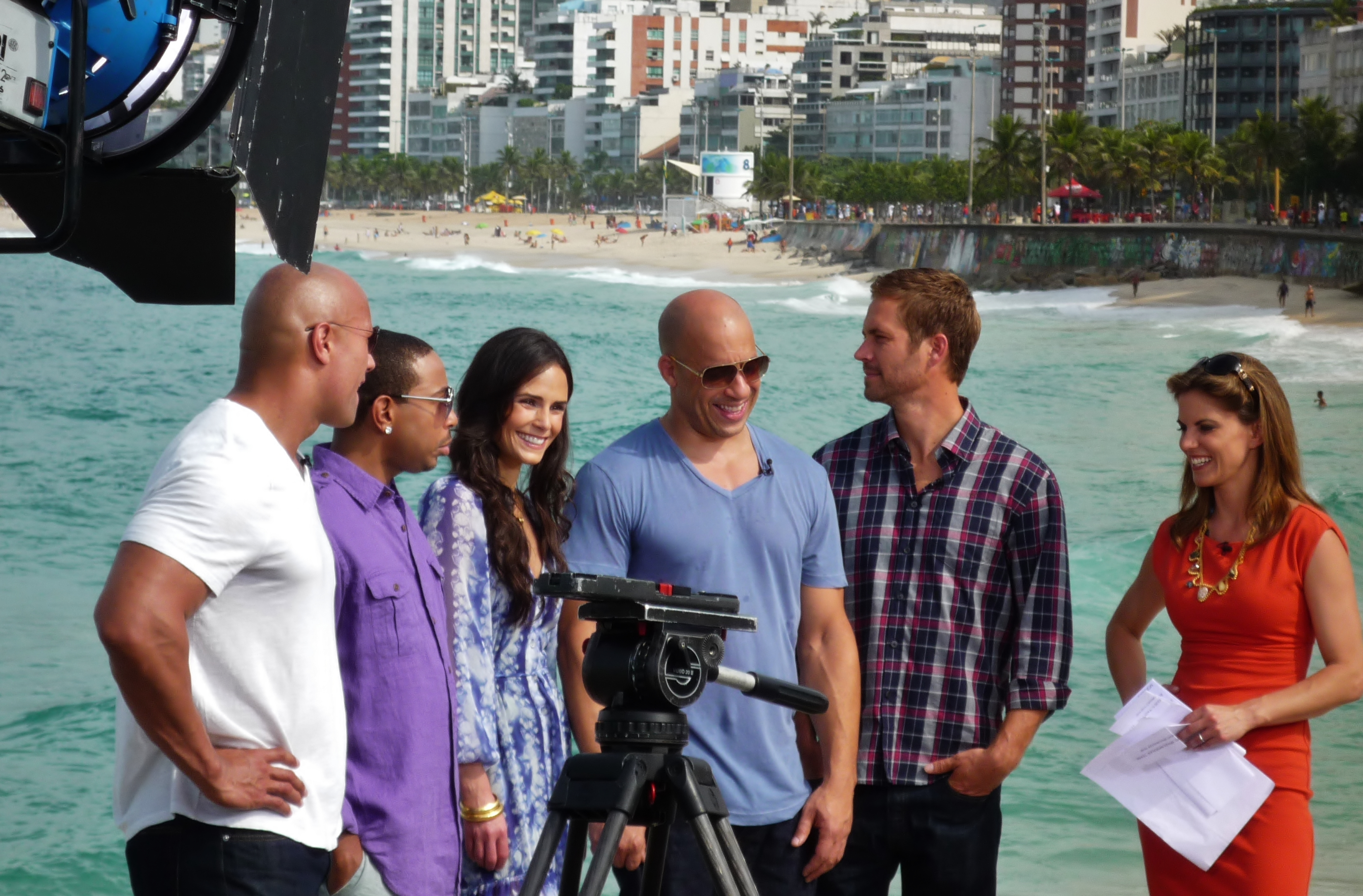
Fast Five cast in Rio de Janeiro

Brazilian reviewers criticized the use of Rio de Janeiro in the film, claiming it was stereotyped as "dominated by heavily armed drug traffickers, corrupt police, and sexy women". O Globo accused the producers of using "aerial shots and quick editing" to "deceive the viewer" into believing that the criminal acts take place in Rio. Globo also reacted negatively to the use of "foreigners" to represent Brazilians, "speaking Portuguese with laughable accents". Veja agreed with O Globo, saying, "The city of Rio and the Rio Film Commission supported the production. But the image that will spread across the world is exactly what the city doesn't want."

=== Accolades ===
In December, 2011, Richard Corliss ranked the film number 10 on his list of the Top 10 Best Movies of 2011, saying, "A carnival of roguish heroes and pretty girls, car chases and cliffhangers, Fast Five is as much a tribute as The Artist or Hugo to the cinema's primal thrills." Empire placed the film number 20 on its list of the Top 20 Films of 2011, while IGN named it the "Best Action Movie" of 2011. Fast Five was listed as the number 1 most illegally downloaded film of 2011 on BitTorrent with approximately 9.3 million downloads.

Accolades received by Fast Five
Award	Date of ceremony	Category	Recipient(s)	Result	Ref.
BMI Film & TV Awards	May 19, 2011	BMI Film Music Awards	Brian Tyler	Won	
Critics' Choice Movie Awards	January 12, 2012	Best Action Movie	Fast Five	Nominated	
Golden Reel Awards	February 19, 2012	Outstanding Achievement in Sound Editing – Sound Effects and Foley for Feature Film	Fast Five	Nominated	
Golden Trailer Awards	June 29, 2011	Best Action TV Spot	"Fast Women" (AV Squad)	Nominated	
Golden Trailer Awards	June 29, 2011	Best Summer 2011 Blockbuster Poster	Fast Five (Cold Open)	Nominated	
Golden Trailer Awards	June 29, 2011	Best Summer Blockbuster 2011 TV Spot	"Super Bowl" (AV Squad)	Won	
Hollywood Post Alliance Awards	November 10, 2011	Outstanding Sound – Feature Film	Peter Brown, Jon Taylor, and Frank A. Montaño	Nominated	
NAACP Image Awards	February 17, 2012	Outstanding Actor in a Motion Picture	Vin Diesel	Nominated	
People's Choice Awards	January 11, 2012	Favorite Action Movie	Fast Five	Nominated	
People's Choice Awards	January 11, 2012	Favorite Action Movie Star	Vin Diesel	Nominated	
Saturn Awards	July 26, 2012	Best Action/Adventure Film	Fast Five	Nominated	
Saturn Awards	July 26, 2012	Best Editing	Kelly Matsumoto, Fred Raskin, and Christian Wagner	Nominated	
Teen Choice Awards	August 7, 2011	Choice Movie – Action	Fast Five	Won	
Teen Choice Awards	August 7, 2011	Choice Movie Actor – Action	Vin Diesel	Nominated	
Teen Choice Awards	August 7, 2011	Choice Movie Actor – Action	Dwayne Johnson	Nominated	
Teen Choice Awards	August 7, 2011	Choice Movie Actor – Action	Paul Walker	Nominated	
Teen Choice Awards	August 7, 2011	Choice Movie Actress – Action	Jordana Brewster	Nominated	

== Sequels ==
Following the release of this film, any additional film in the series focused on "more accessible action elements" with heist films in this film and spy films from Fast & Furious 6 (2013) onwards. Fast & Furious 6 surpassed the box-office take of this film, and Furious 7 (2015) became the "most critically and commercially successful film" in the series. It was followed by The Fate of the Furious (2017), serving as the start of a next trilogy of films that includes F9 (2021) and Fast X (2023). An eleventh and final mainline film, Fast Forever (2028), is in production.

== Works cited ==
- "Fast Five" (PDF). Official Fast Five website. Universal Pictures. Archived from the original (PDF) on May 16, 2011.
